= Xuezelu station =

Nanjing Metro station

Coordinates: 32°05′30″N 118°55′01″E

Xuezelu 学则路
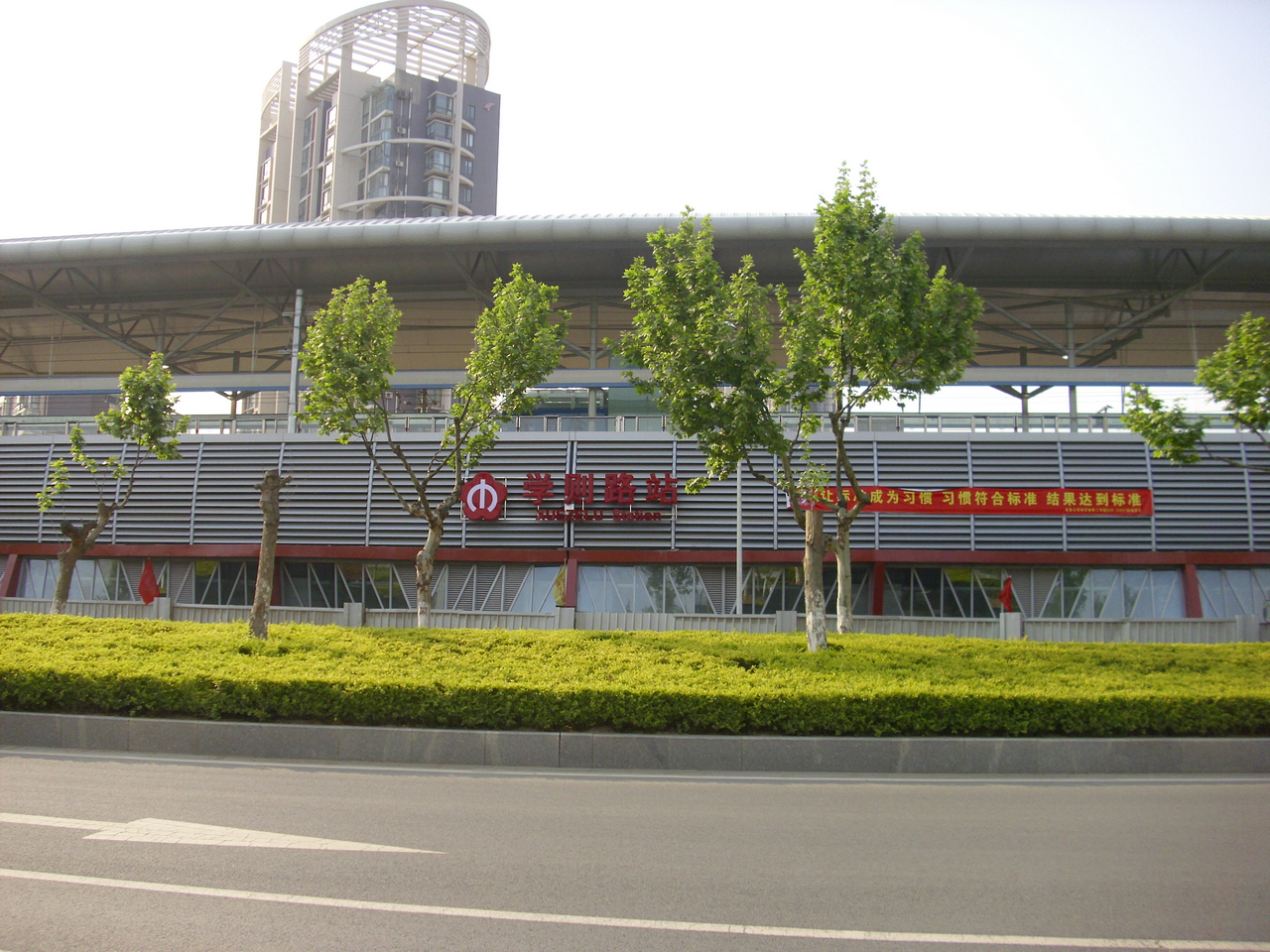

General information
- Location: Xianlin Avenue; Qixia District, Nanjing, Jiangsu; China
- Operated by: Nanjing Metro Co. Ltd.
- Line: Line 2

Construction
- Structure type: Elevated

Other information
- Station code: 226

History
- Opened: 28 May 2010

Services
Preceding station	Nanjing Metro	Following station
Xianhemen towards Yuzui	Line 2	Xianlinzhongxin towards Jingtianlu
Location

Xuezelu station (simplified Chinese: 学则路站; traditional Chinese: 學則路站; pinyin: Xuézélù Zhàn) is a station on Line 2 of the Nanjing Metro, located along the north side of Xianlin Avenue (仙林大道) in Qixia District. It started operations on 28 May 2010 along with the rest of Line 2.

The station covers an area of 5,109 m^{2} (54,990 ft^{2}). It is 140 m (460 ft) long, 19.24 m (63.1 ft) wide and 17.18 m (56.4 ft) high.

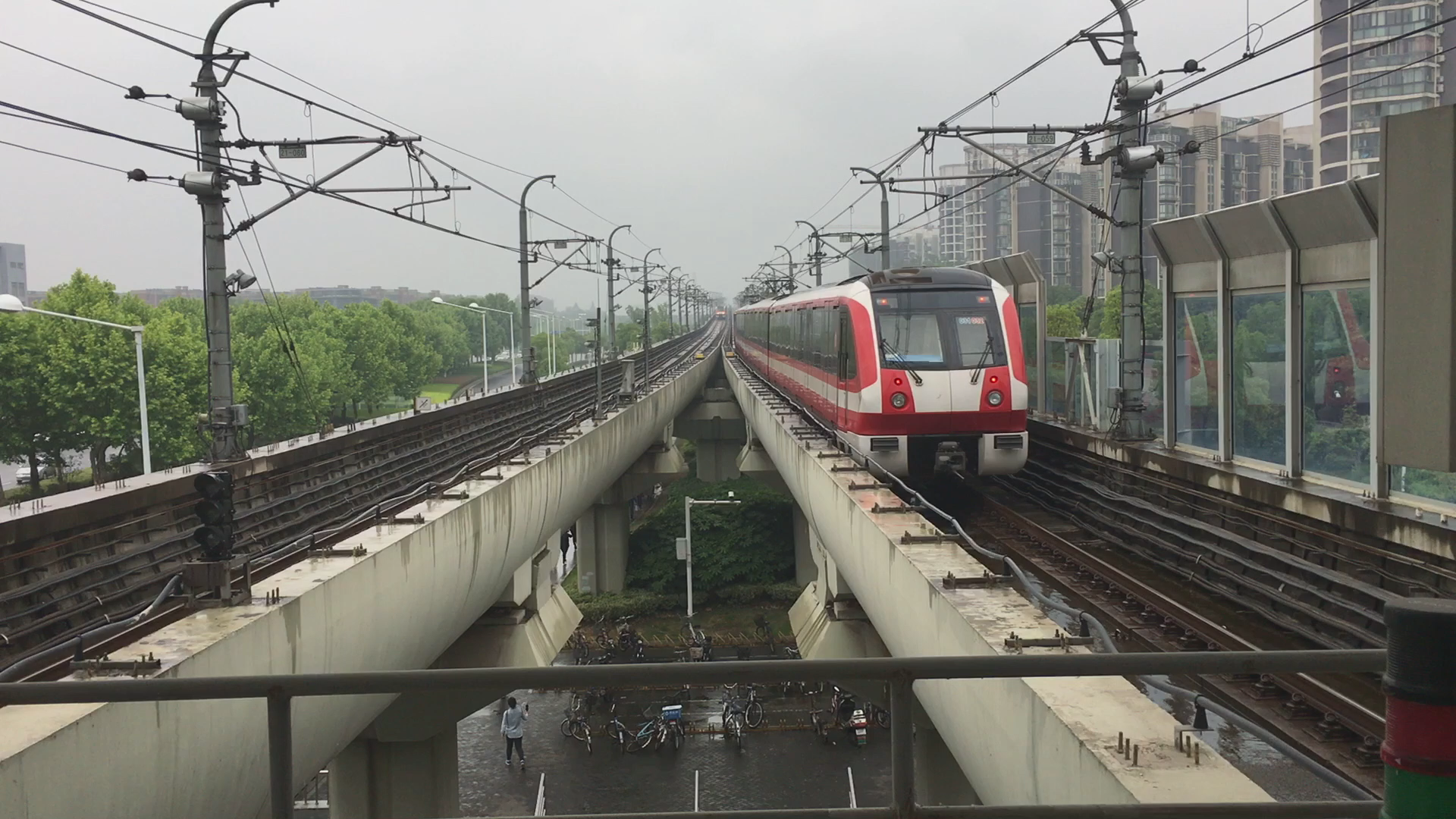

== Piano stairs ==
In April 2011, Xuezelu station became the first station on the Nanjing Metro to feature a set of "musical stairs" leading up connecting the platform and the concourse levels; since then, Muxuyuan has also installed similar stairs. The stairs were alternatively painted white and black like the keys of a piano, and with the aid of sensors on the adjacent wall, would emit pianistic sounds whenever passengers used the stairs. The utilitarian hope was that this unique feature would help attract passengers away from the adjacent escalators and lower their load. The installation of these stairs caused a large number of Nanjing residents to purposely come to the station to experience them, but also inspired other installations in other mainland Chinese cities. However, the eventual wear and tear on the sensors lead to their uninstalling in December 2012.

== Nearby places ==
- Yadong City (亚东城)
- Nanjing Normal University Xianlin Campus
- Yingtian Vocational College (应天职业技术学院)
- Nanjing International School

== Video ==
Looking west from Xuezelu station platform
