= Xianlinzhongxin station =

Nanjing Metro station

Coordinates: 32°05′54″N 118°55′47″E

Xianlinzhongxin 仙林中心
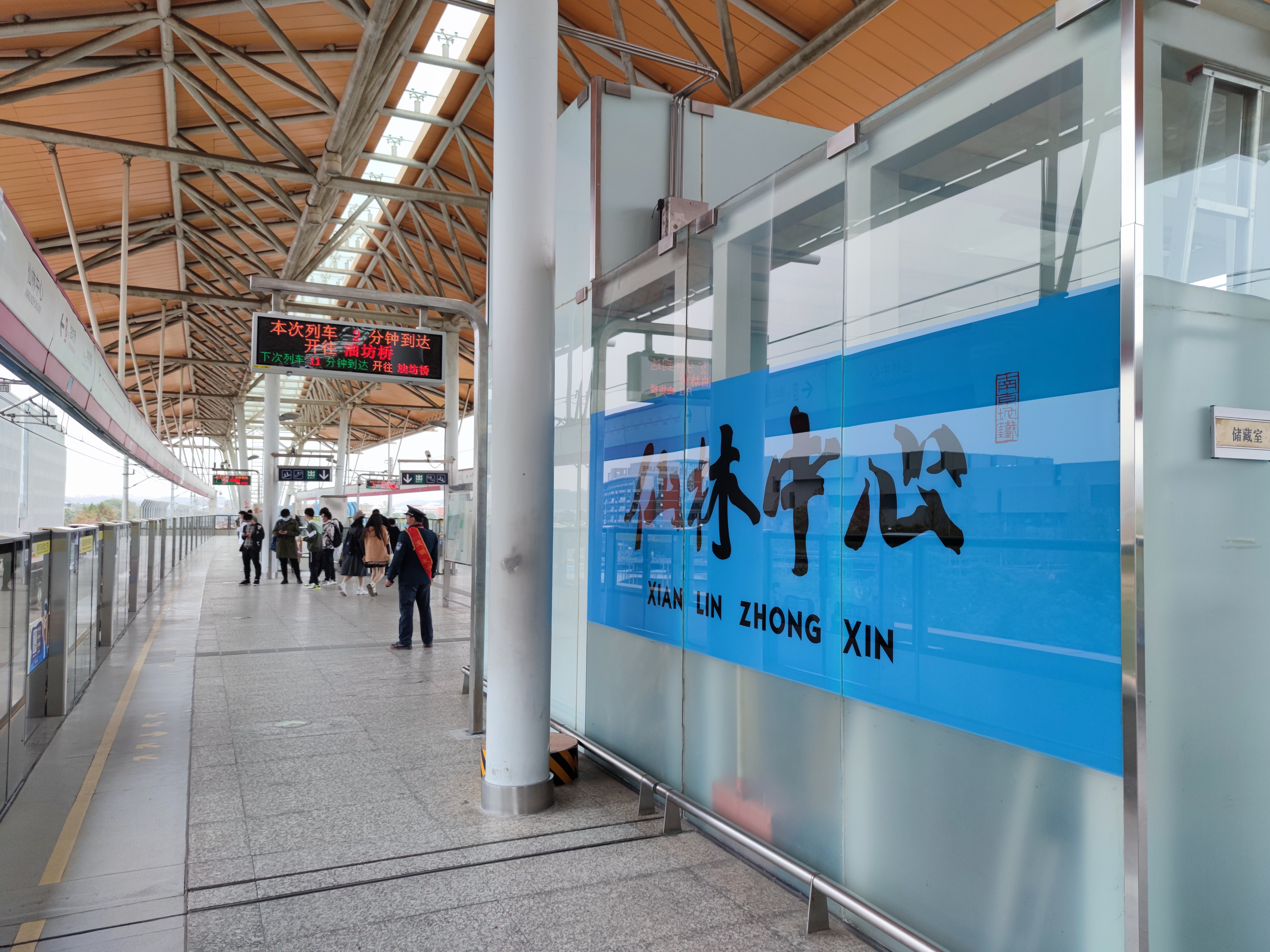

General information
- Location: Xianlin Avenue (仙林大道); Qixia District, Nanjing, Jiangsu; China
- Operated by: Nanjing Metro Co. Ltd.
- Line: Line 2

Construction
- Structure type: Elevated

Other information
- Station code: 227

History
- Opened: 28 May 2010

Services
Preceding station	Nanjing Metro	Following station
Xuezelu towards Yuzui	Line 2	Yangshangongyuan towards Jingtianlu
Location

Xianlinzhongxin station (Chinese: 仙林中心站; pinyin: Xiānlínzhōngxīn Zhàn; lit. 'Xianlin Center station') is a station of Line 2 of the Nanjing Metro. It started operations on 28 May 2010 along with the rest of Line 2.
