= Yangshangongyuan station =

Nanjing Metro station

Coordinates: 32°06′14″N 118°56′24″E

Yangshangongyuan 羊山公园
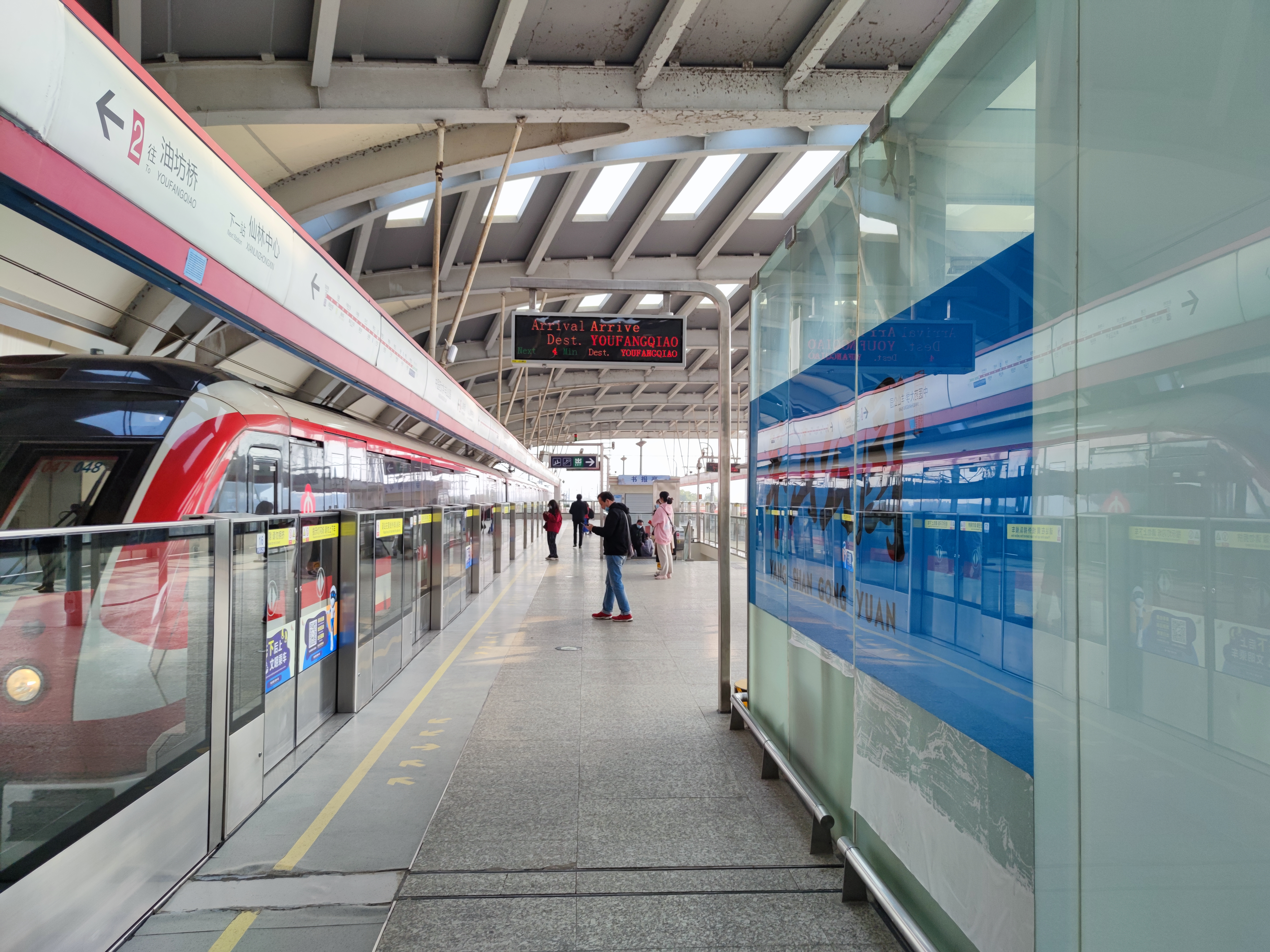

General information
- Location: Xianlin Avenue (仙林大道); Qixia District, Nanjing, Jiangsu; China
- Operated by: Nanjing Metro Co. Ltd.
- Line: Line 2

Construction
- Structure type: Elevated

Other information
- Station code: 228

History
- Opened: 28 May 2010

Services
Preceding station	Nanjing Metro	Following station
Xianlinzhongxin towards Yuzui	Line 2	NJU Xianlin Campus towards Jingtianlu
Location

Yangshangongyuan station (simplified Chinese: 羊山公园站; traditional Chinese: 羊山公園站; pinyin: Yángshāngōngyuán Zhàn; lit. 'Yangshan Park station') is a station of Line 2 of the Nanjing Metro. It started operations on 28 May 2010 along with the rest of Line 2.
