= Jinmalu station (Nanjing Metro) =

Nanjing Metro interchange station

Coordinates: 32°04′18″N 118°54′22″E

Jinmalu 金马路
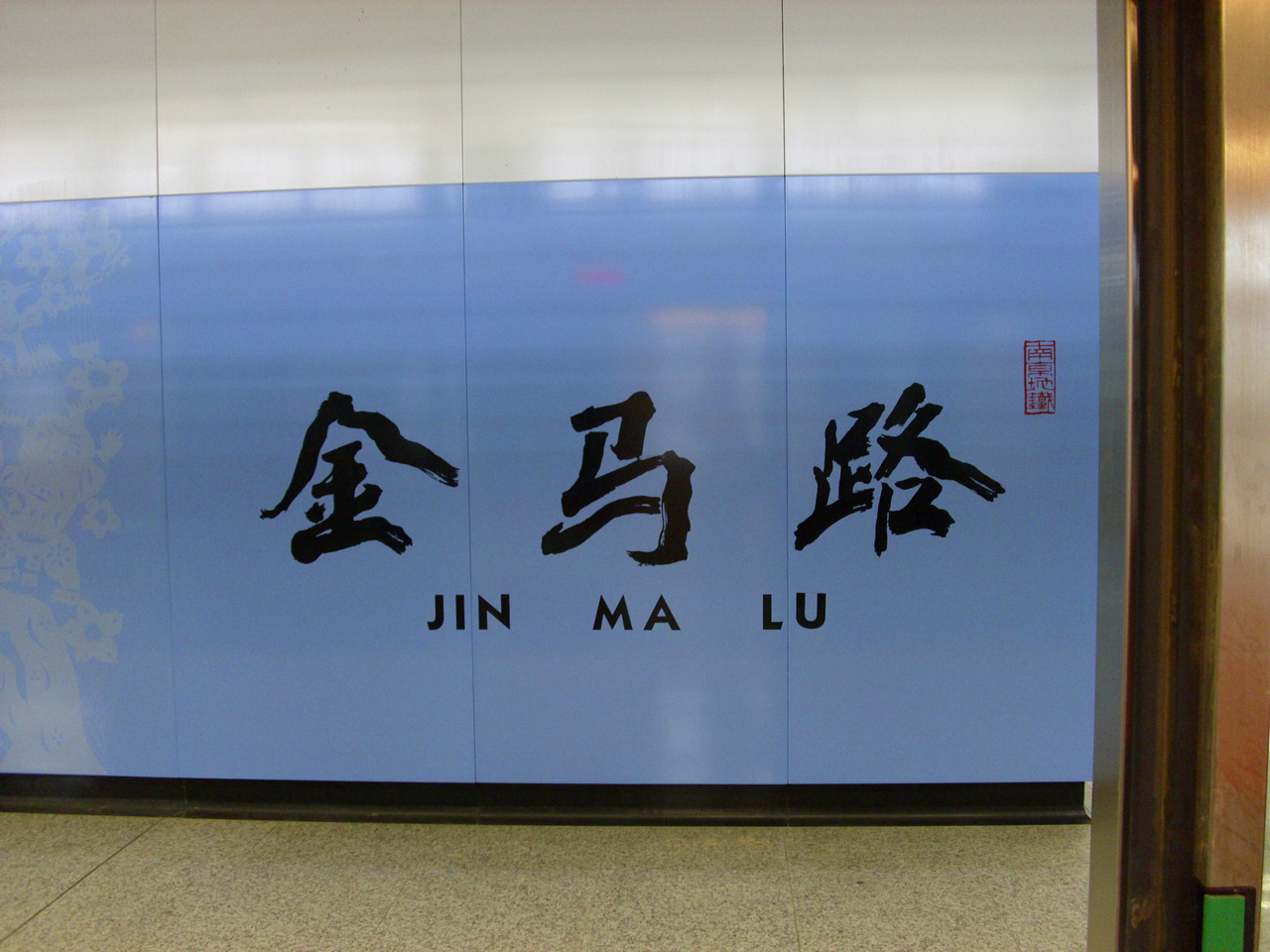
- A sign at Jinmalu Station

General information
- Location: Qixia District, Nanjing, Jiangsu; China
- Lines: Line 2; Line 4

Other information
- Station code: 224 (Line 2); 407 (Line 4)

History
- Opened: 28 May 2010 (Line 2); 18 January 2017 (Line 4)

Services
Preceding station	Nanjing Metro	Following station
Maqun towards Yuzui	Line 2	Xianhemen towards Jingtianlu
Suning Headquarters – Xuzhuang towards Longjiang	Line 4	Huitonglu towards Xianlinhu
Location

Jinmalu station (simplified Chinese: 金马路站; traditional Chinese: 金馬路站; pinyin: Jīnmǎlù Zhàn; lit. 'Jinma Road station') is an interchange station between Line 2 and Line 4 of the Nanjing Metro. It is located to the north of Jinma Road and south of Benma Road (奔马路), parallel to Shishi Road (石狮路) in Qixia District. It started operations on 28 May 2010 along with the rest of Line 2; the interchange with Line 4 opened on 18 January 2017 along with the rest of that line.

The Zijinshan East Station of the Shanghai–Wuhan–Chengdu high-speed railway and the Shanghai–Nanjing intercity railway will be located next to Jinmalu Station.
