= Yurundajie station =

Nanjing Metro station

Coordinates: 31°59′01″N 118°43′22″E

Yurundajie 雨润大街
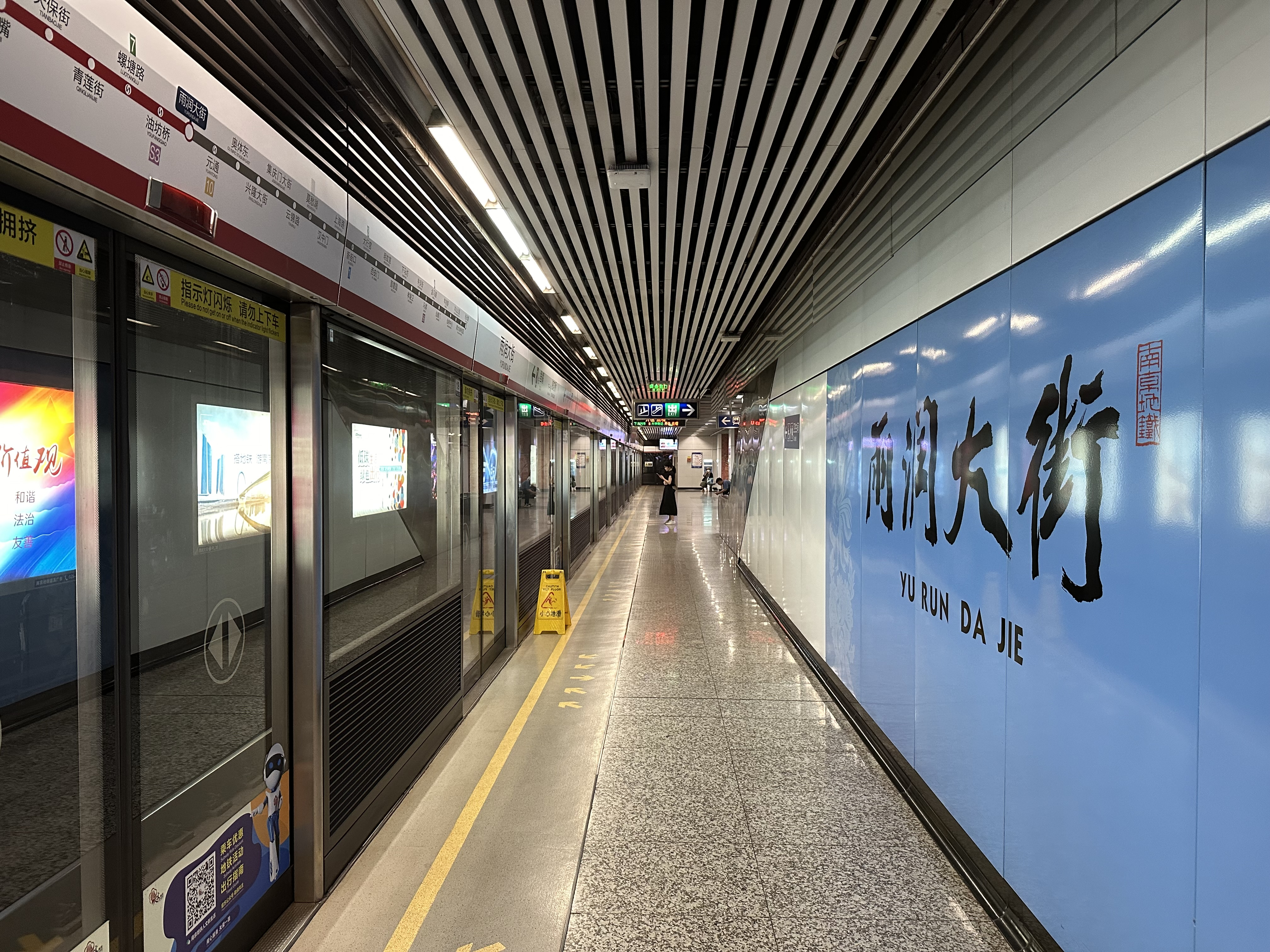

General information
- Location: Yurun Street; Jianye District, Nanjing, Jiangsu; China
- Operated by: Nanjing Metro Co. Ltd.
- Line: Line 2

Construction
- Structure type: Underground

Other information
- Station code: 206

History
- Opened: 28 May 2010

Services
Preceding station	Nanjing Metro	Following station
Youfangqiao towards Yuzui	Line 2	Yuantong towards Jingtianlu
Location

Yurundajie station (simplified Chinese: 雨润大街站; traditional Chinese: 雨潤大街站; pinyin: Yǔrùndàjiē Zhàn; lit. 'Yurun Street station'), known as Zhonghecun station (中和村站; Zhōnghécūn Zhàn) during planning until 2007, is a station of Line 2 of the Nanjing Metro. It started operations on 28 May 2010 along with the rest of Line 2.
