= Hanzhongmen station =

Nanjing Metro station

Coordinates: 32°02′34″N 118°46′01″E

Hanzhongmen 汉中门
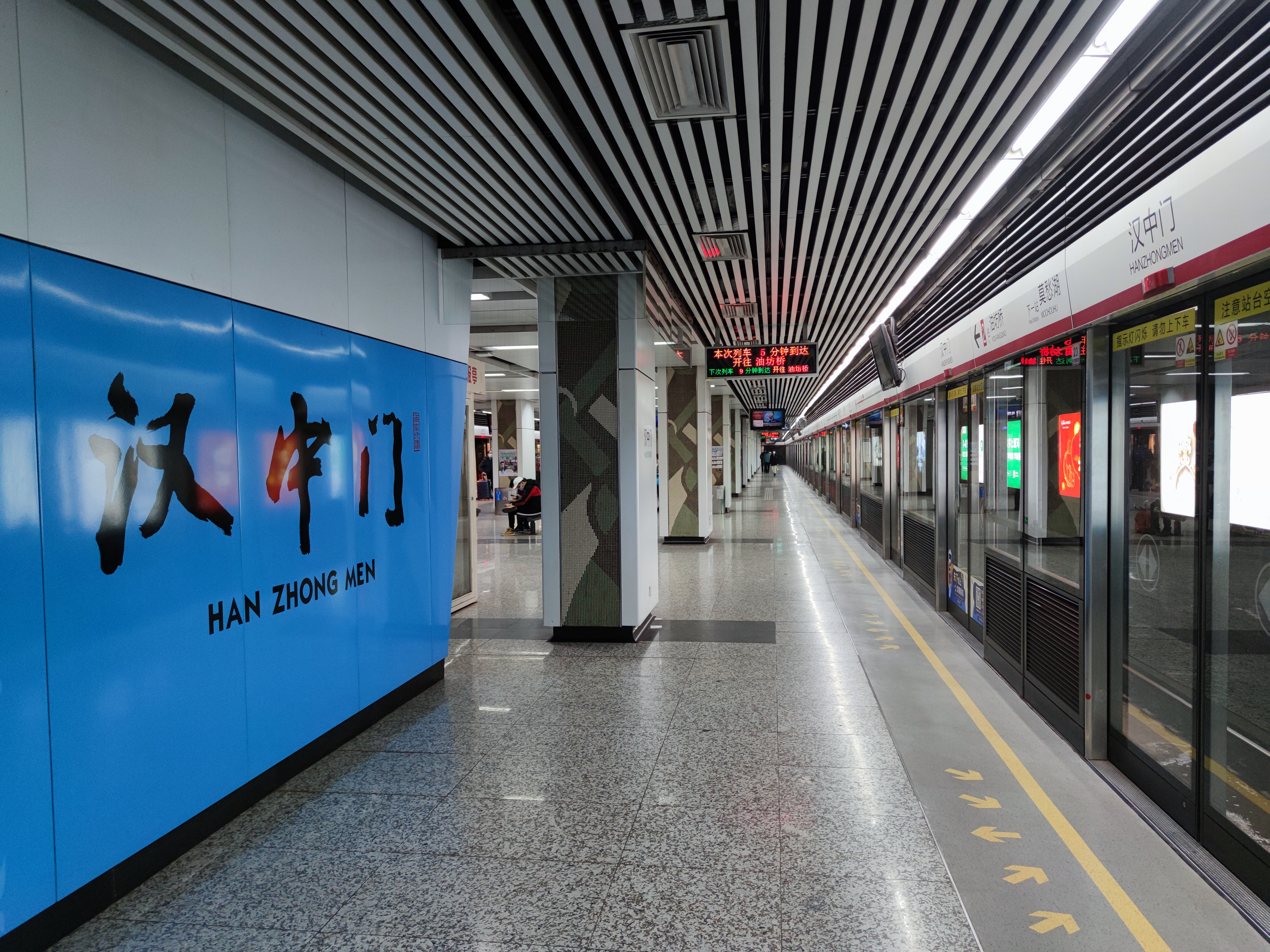

General information
- Location: Hanzhong Road and Huju Road (虎踞路); Gulou District / Qinhuai District border, Nanjing, Jiangsu; China
- Operated by: Nanjing Metro Co. Ltd.
- Line(s): Line 2

Construction
- Structure type: Underground

Other information
- Station code: 213

History
- Opened: 28 May 2010

Services
Preceding station	Nanjing Metro	Following station
Mochouhu towards Yuzui	Line 2	Shanghailu towards Jingtianlu

Hanzhongmen station (simplified Chinese: 汉中门站; traditional Chinese: 漢中門站; pinyin: Hànzhōngmén Zhàn) is a station of Line 2 of the Nanjing Metro. It started operations on 28 May 2010 along with the rest of Line 2.

== Around the station ==
- Qingliangshan Park
- Stone City
