= Xiaolingwei station =

Nanjing Metro station

Coordinates: 32°02′08″N 118°51′27″E

Xiaolingwei 孝陵卫
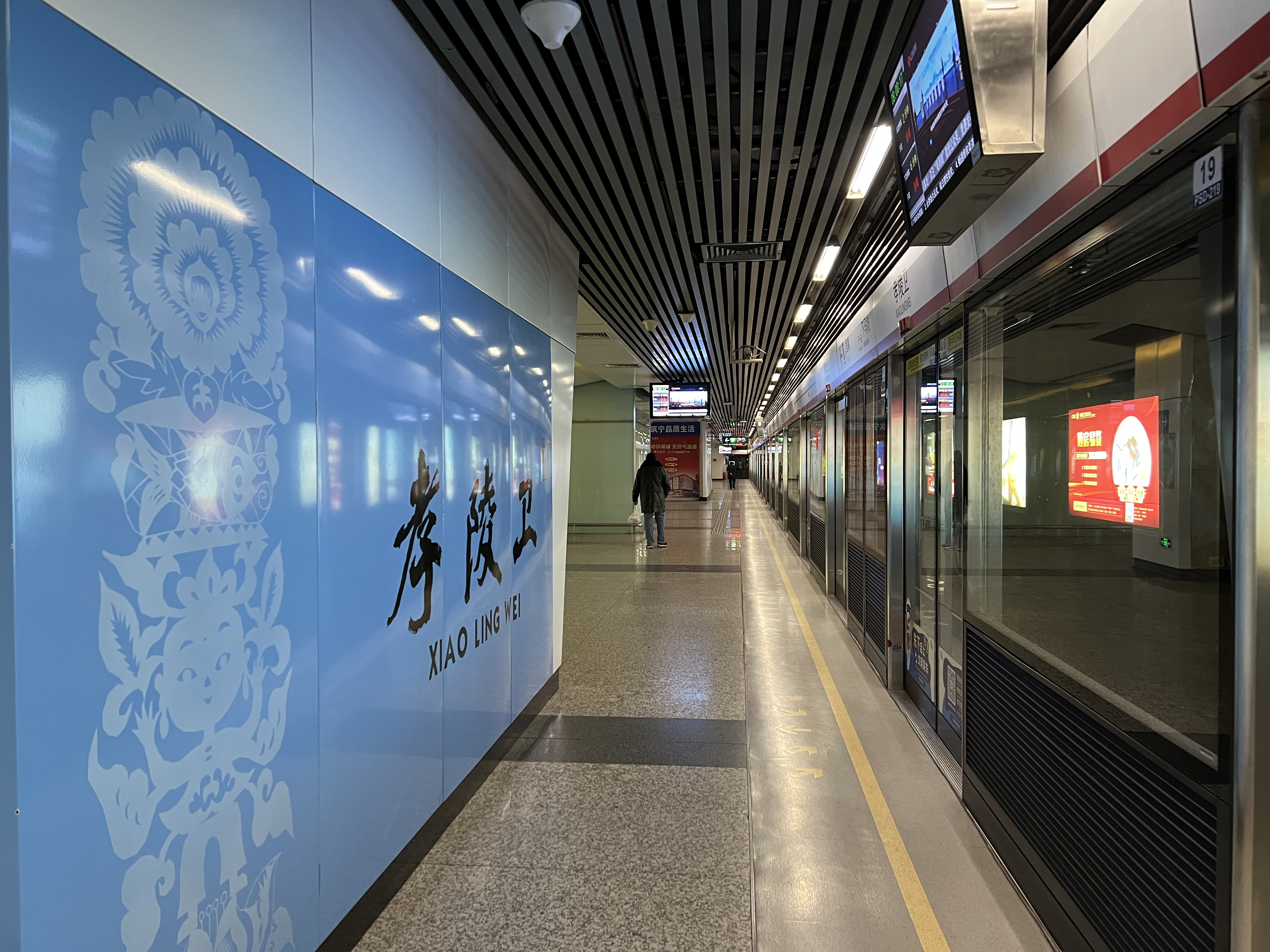

General information
- Location: Xuanwu District, Nanjing, Jiangsu; China
- Operated by: Nanjing Metro Co. Ltd.
- Line: Line 2

Construction
- Structure type: Underground

Other information
- Station code: 221

History
- Opened: 28 May 2010

Services
| Preceding station | Nanjing Metro | Following station |
|---|---|---|
| Xiamafang towards Yuzui | Line 2 | Zhonglingjie towards Jingtianlu |
Location

Xiaolingwei station (simplified Chinese: 孝陵卫站; traditional Chinese: 孝陵衛站; pinyin: Xiàolíngwèi Zhàn) is a station of Line 2 of the Nanjing Metro. It started operations on 28 May 2010 along with the rest of Line 2.
