= Zhonglingjie station =

Nanjing Metro station

Coordinates: 32°02′22″N 118°52′09″E

Zhonglingjie 钟灵街
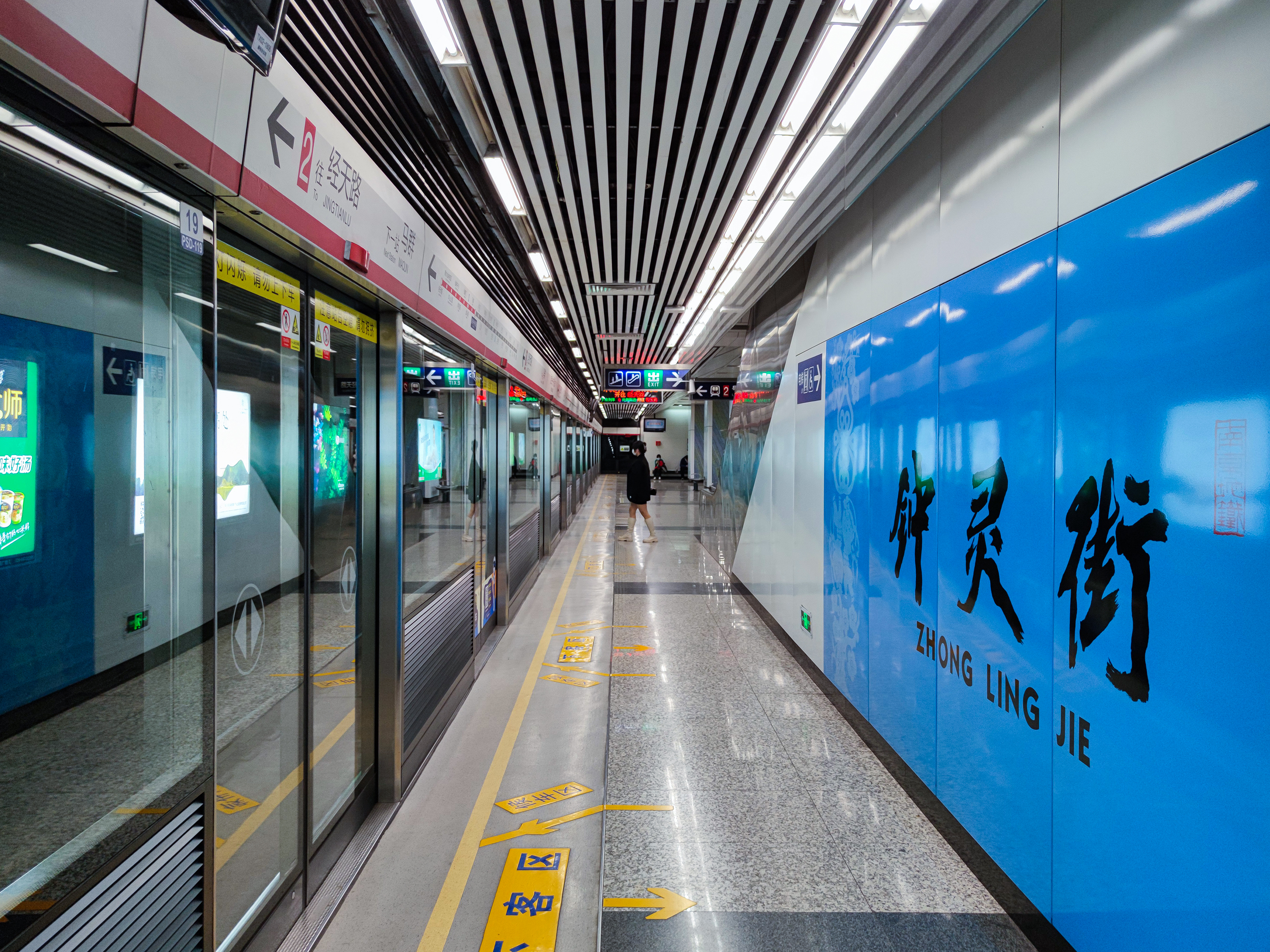

General information
- Location: Xuanwu District, Nanjing, Jiangsu; China
- Operated by: Nanjing Metro Co. Ltd.
- Line: Line 2

Construction
- Structure type: Underground

Other information
- Station code: 222

History
- Opened: 28 May 2010

Services
Preceding station	Nanjing Metro	Following station
Xiaolingwei towards Yuzui	Line 2	Maqun towards Jingtianlu
Location

Zhonglingjie Station (simplified Chinese: 钟灵街站; traditional Chinese: 鐘靈街站; pinyin: Zhōnglíngjiē Zhàn; lit. 'Zhongling Street station') is a station of Line 2 of the Nanjing Metro. It started operations on 28 May 2010 along with the rest of Line 2. The theme of this station's decorations is the winter solstice.
