= Xianhemen station =

Nanjing Metro station

Coordinates: 32°05′07″N 118°54′18″E

Xianhemen 仙鹤门
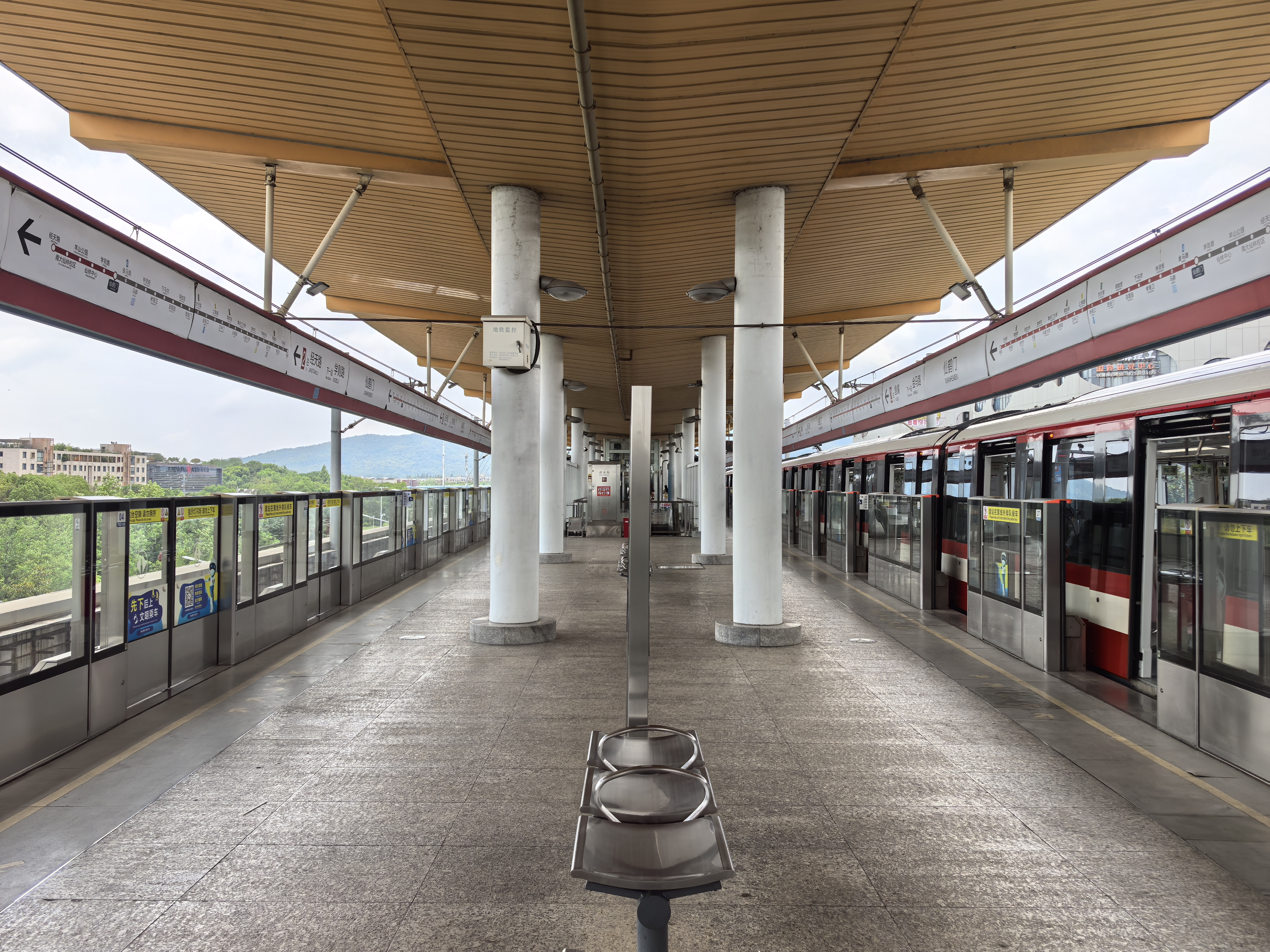

General information
- Location: Xianlin Avenue (仙林大道); Xuanwu District, Nanjing, Jiangsu; China
- Operated by: Nanjing Metro Co. Ltd.
- Line: Line 2

Construction
- Structure type: Elevated

Other information
- Station code: 225

History
- Opened: 28 May 2010

Services
Preceding station	Nanjing Metro	Following station
Jinmalu towards Yuzui	Line 2	Xuezelu towards Jingtianlu
Location

Xianhemen station (simplified Chinese: 仙鹤门站; traditional Chinese: 仙鶴門站; pinyin: Xiānhèmén Zhàn) is a station of Line 2 of the Nanjing Metro. It started operations on 28 May 2010 along with the rest of Line 2.
