= Muxuyuan station =

Nanjing Metro station

Coordinates: 32°02′25″N 118°50′06″E

Muxuyuan 明孝陵·苜蓿园
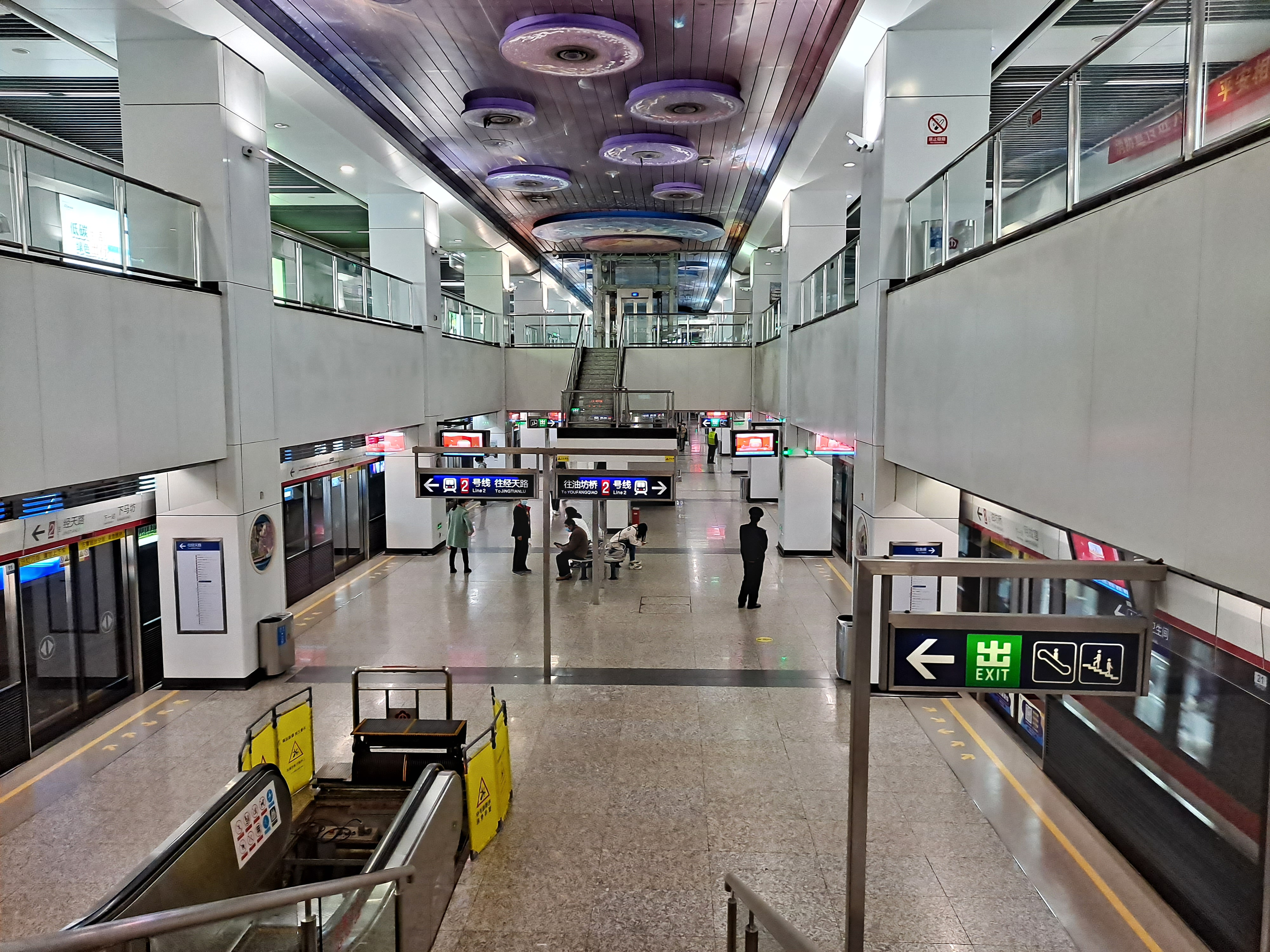
- The Line 2 platform of Muxuyuan station

Chinese name
- Simplified Chinese: 明孝陵·苜蓿园站
- Traditional Chinese: 明孝陵·苜蓿園站
Transcriptions
Standard Mandarin
- Hanyu Pinyin: Míng Xiào Líng·Mùxuyuán Zhàn

General information
- Other names: Ming Xiaoling Mausoleum
- Location: Xuanwu District, Nanjing, Jiangsu; China
- Line: Line 2

Construction
- Structure type: Underground

Other information
- Station code: 219

History
- Opened: 28 May 2010

Services
Preceding station	Nanjing Metro	Following station
Minggugong towards Yuzui	Line 2	Xiamafang towards Jingtianlu
Location

Muxuyuan (Ming Xiaoling Mausoleum) Station is a railway station on Line 2 of Nanjing Metro. It started operations on 28 May 2010 along with the rest of Line 2.

== Statistics ==
It has a length of 199.68 m (655.1 ft), a width of 20.8 m (68 ft), a height of 14.46 m (47.4 ft), and it covers an area of 11,015 m^{2} (118,560 sq ft).

== Decorations ==
Since Line 2 of the Nanjing Metro is centered on Chinese traditional festivals, the theme of this station's decorations is the Qixi Festival. At 700 m^{2} (7,500 sq ft), It features the largest painting area of any Line 2 station, if not the entire Nanjing Metro system. Several traditional romance stories can be seen if one looks up at the ceiling, such as Niulang and Zhinü, Houyi and Chang'e and so on.

In April 2013, the station became the second in the Nanjing Metro system, after Xuezelu, to install a set of "musical stairs" leading up from the station platform. The stairs, christened "music stairs" (音乐楼梯), were intended to play chords from the Butterfly Lovers' Violin Concerto whenever passengers would use the stairs. However, repeated wear and tear on the steps has caused loss of this unique functionality.

== Gallery ==
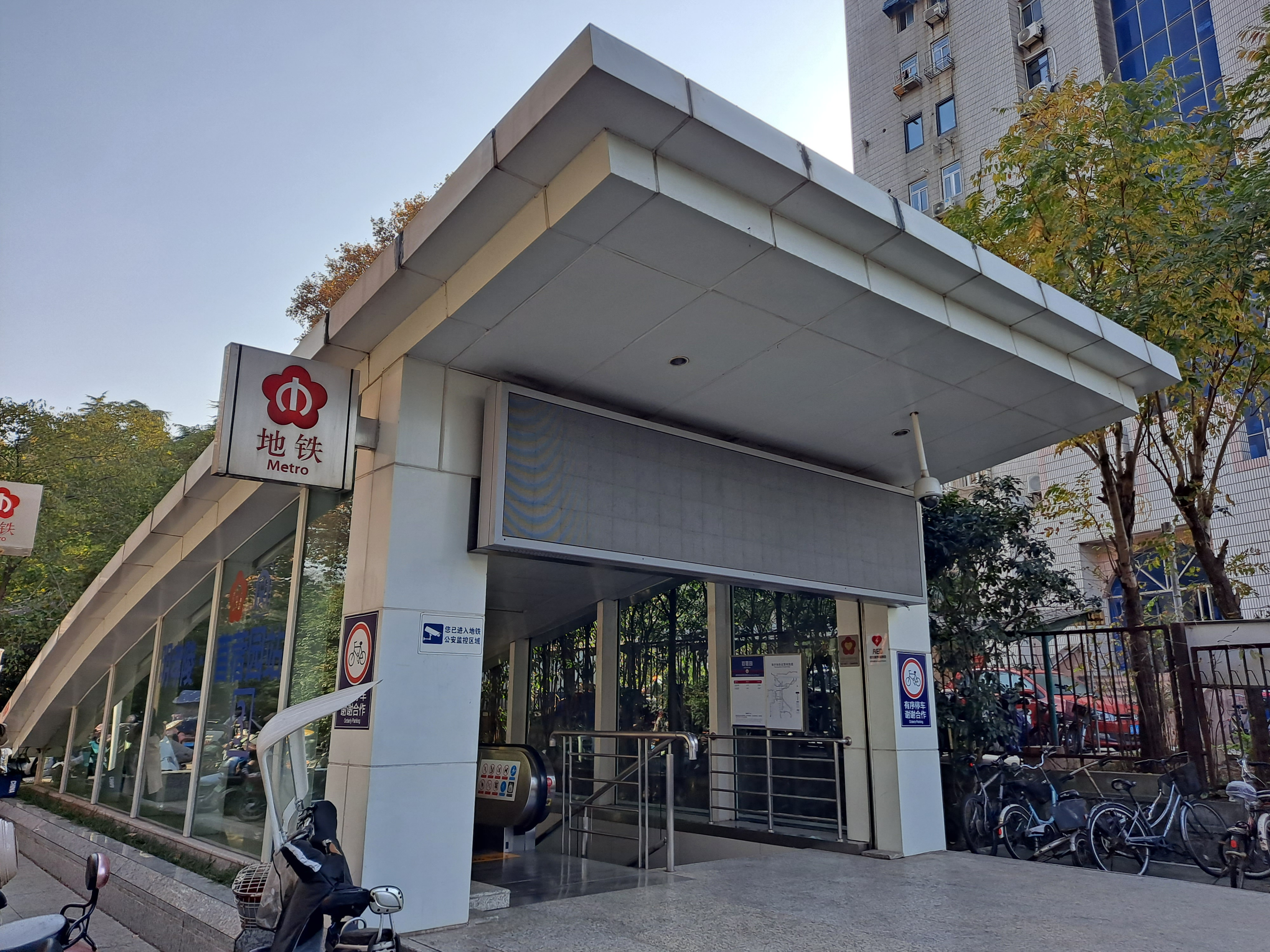
Entrance

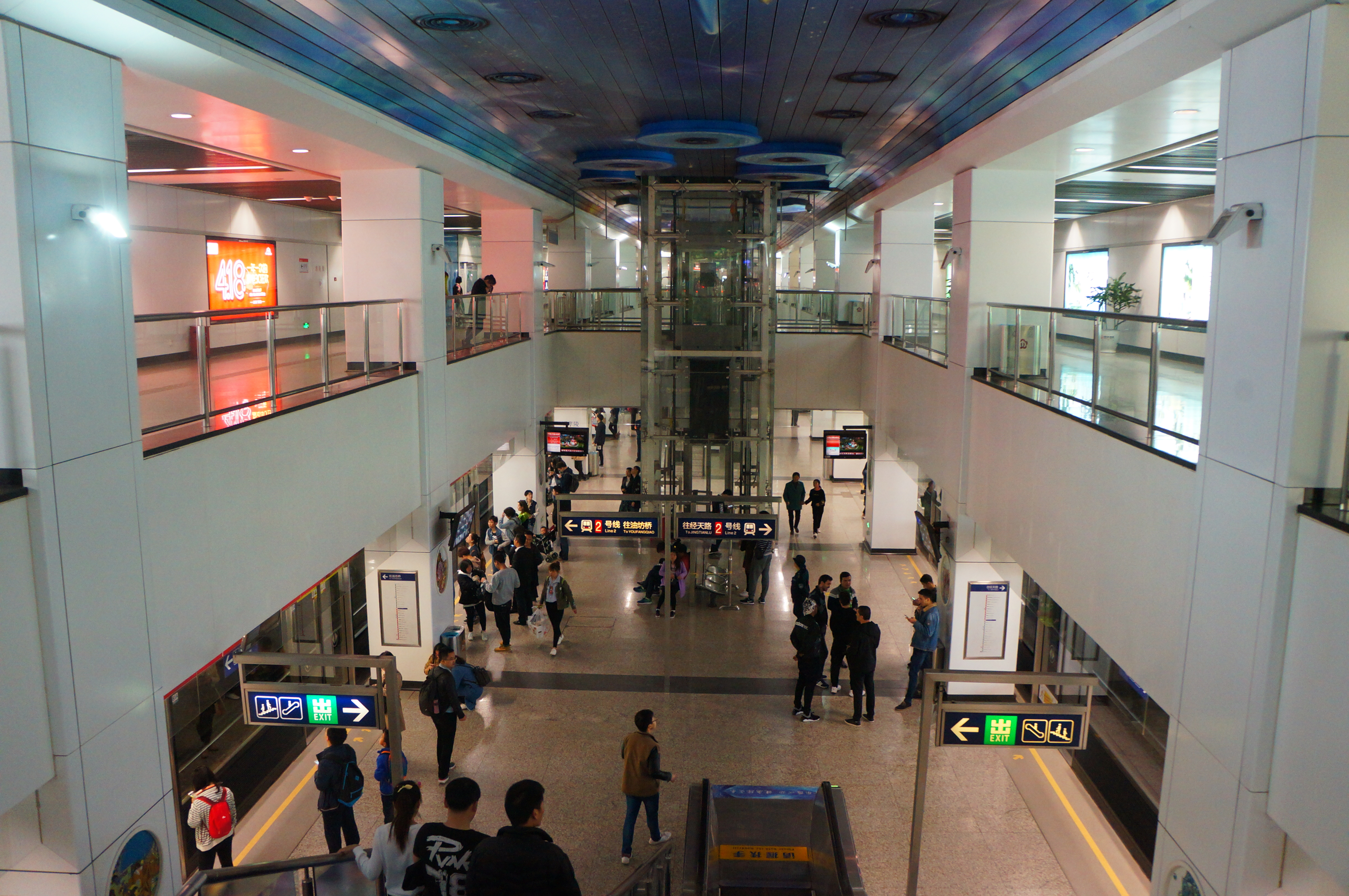
Concourse and platform area

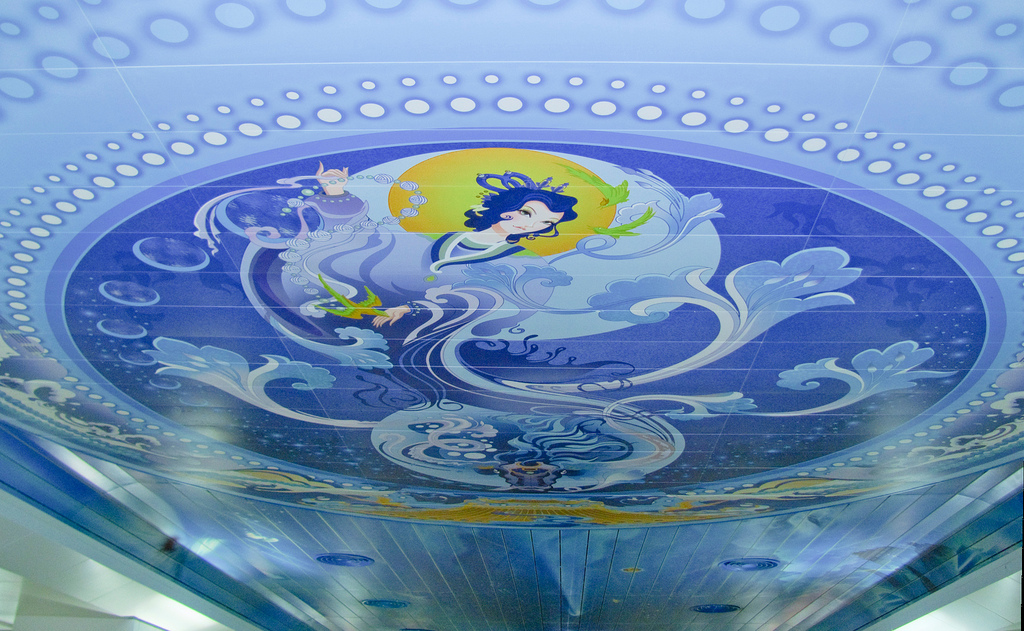
Painting of Zhinü on the ceiling

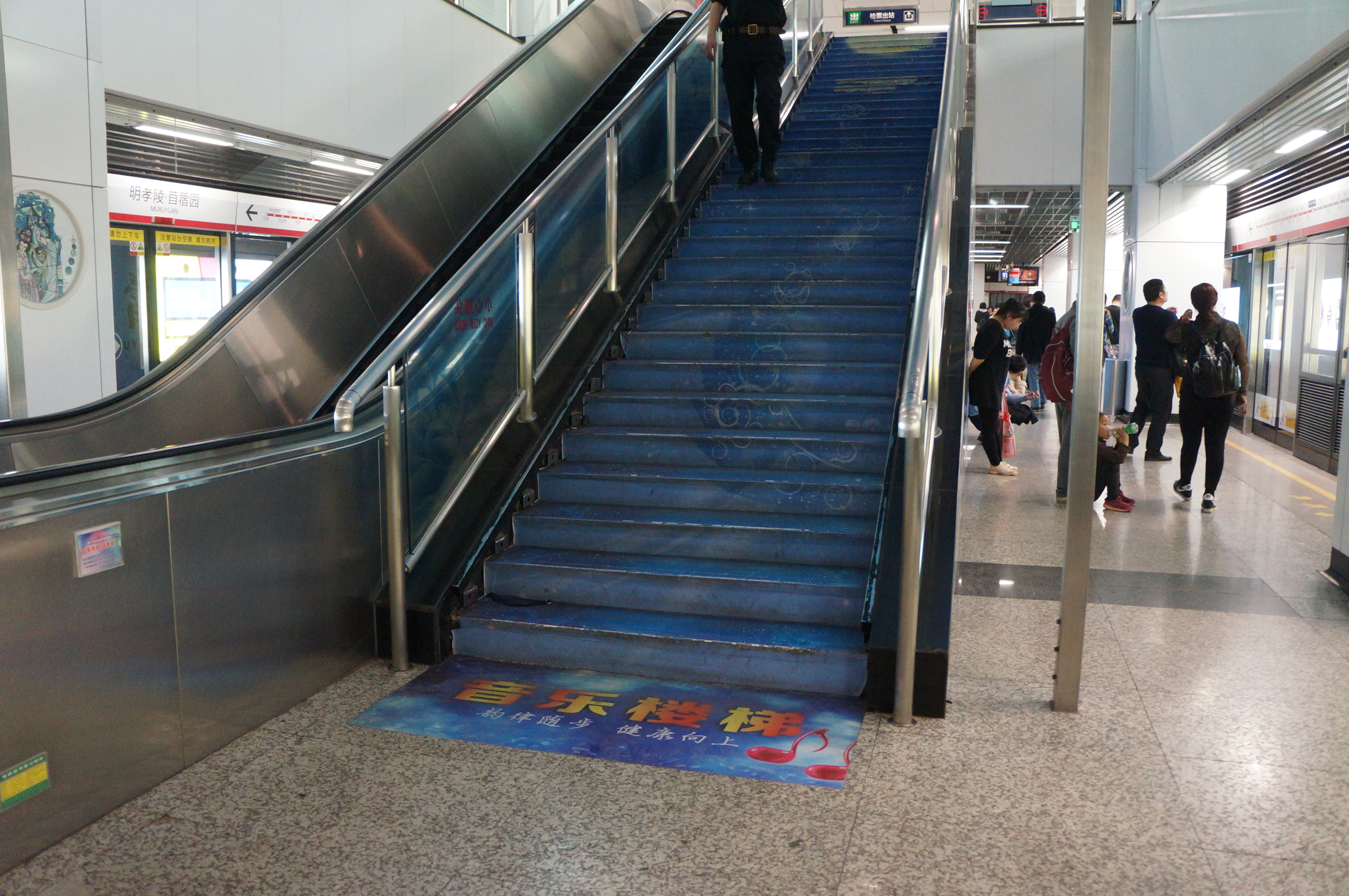
"Music stair" leading up from the platform

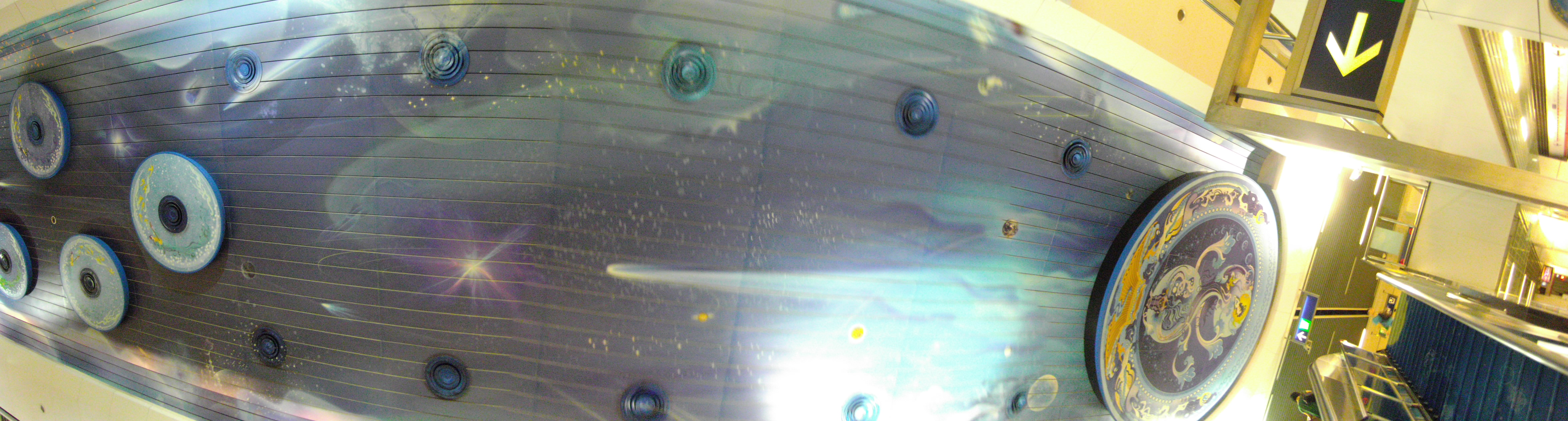
Another set of ceiling paintings on the tale of Niulang and Zhinü

== Around the station ==
- Ming Xiaoling Mausoleum
- Nanjing Botanical Garden, Memorial Sun Yat-Sen
