= Nanjing Trams =

Tram system in Nanjing, China

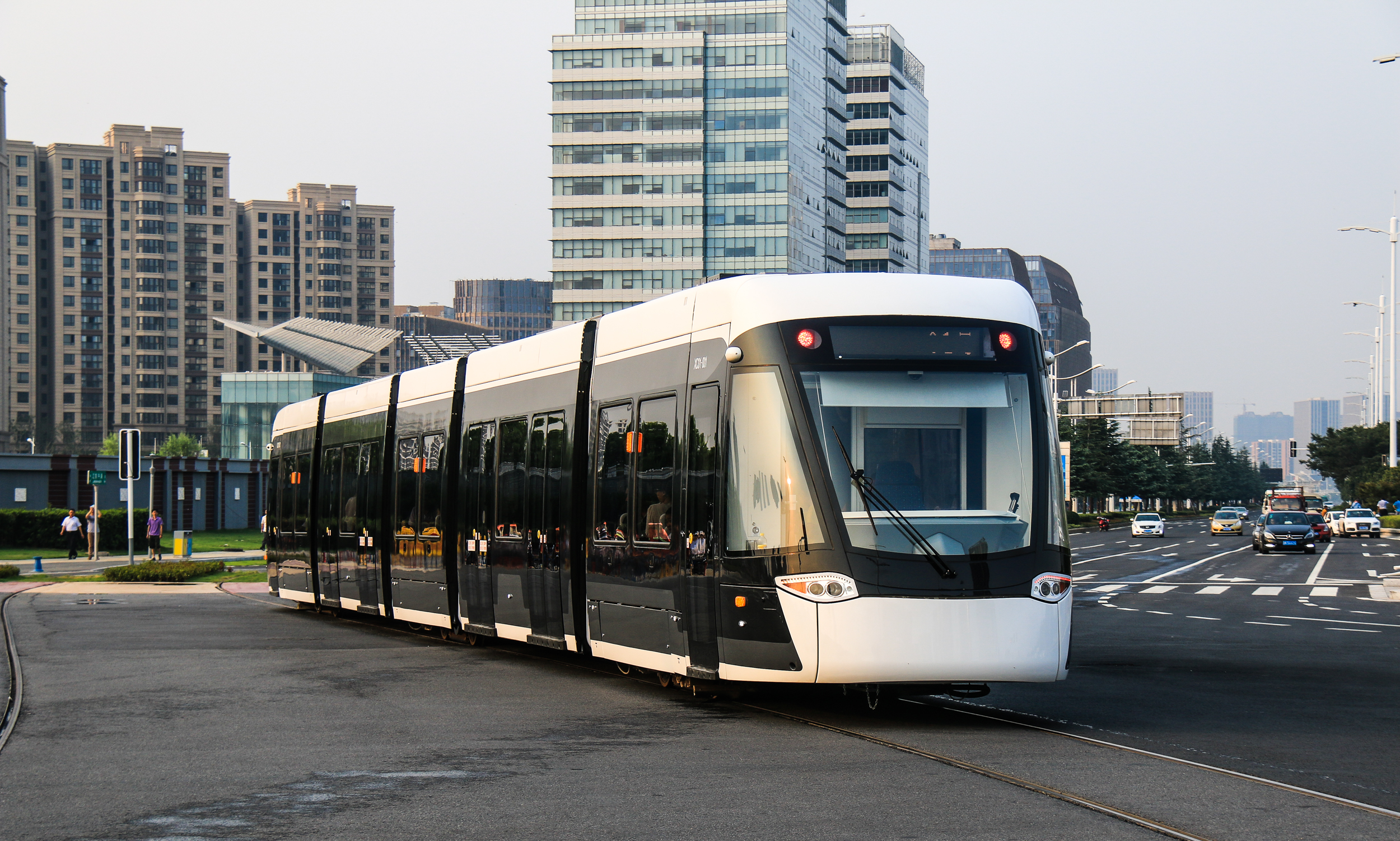
- A Nanjing Hexi tram leaving Yuantong Station

Overview
- Locale: Nanjing, China
- Transit type: Tram
- Number of lines: 2

Operation
- Began operation: 13 August 2014; 12 years ago

Technical
- System length: 16.76 km (10.41 mi)

Nanjing Trams is the tram system of Nanjing, Jiangsu Province, China. There are two lines which are not connected to each other.

The Nanjing trams is a wireless system, powered by lightweight Li-ion batteries. Batteries are charged via a pantograph at stations and terminals, and dynamically during deceleration. Charging time is 46 seconds at intermediate stations, and 10 minutes at terminals. 90% of the lines are catenary-free.

== Lines ==
Hexi tram opened on 13 August 2014. Qilin tram opened on 31 October 2017.

=== Hexi tram ===
The starting point of the Hexi tram line is located at the Nanjing Metro Line 2 Olympic Stadium East station. The other terminus is located in Hexi, 7.76 kilometers (4.82 mi) away. Transfer is available to Nanjing Metro Line 2 and Line 10 at Yuantong. All stations of Hexi tram are located in Jianye District.

=== Qilin tram ===
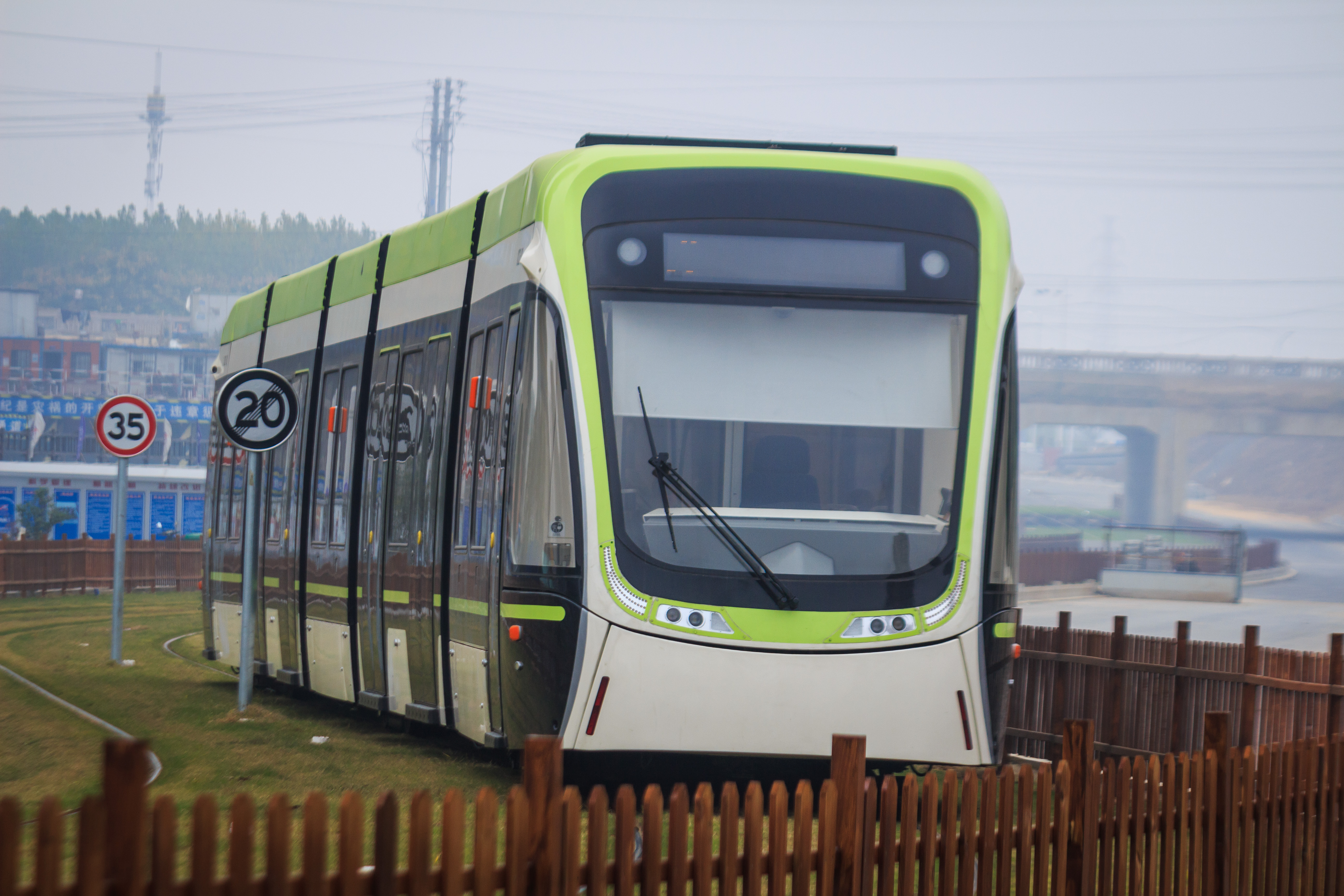
Qilin Tram

Qilin Tram, with a total length of 9 kilometers (5.6 mi), runs between Maqun station and Shiyanglu station. There are 13 stations; one of them is elevated, while the rest are surface-level.

Stations

Map of Nanjing Qilin Tram

Station name		Connections	Location
English	Chinese	Connections	Location
Maqun	马群	2 S6	Qixia
Baishuiqiaolu	百水桥路		Qixia
Magaolu	马高路		Jiangning
Beiwanyingjie	北湾营街		Jiangning
Tianquanlu	天泉路		Jiangning
Nanwanyingjie	南湾营街		Jiangning
Tianxinglu	天兴路		Jiangning
Qididajie	启迪大街		Jiangning
Qilin Ecological Park	麒麟生态公园		Jiangning
Guanghualu	光华路		Jiangning
Shuijiefang	水街坊		Jiangning
Zhihuilu	智汇路		Jiangning
Shiyanglu	石杨路	10	Jiangning

== See also ==
- Nanjing Metro
