= Nanjing University Xianlin Campus station =

Nanjing Metro station

Coordinates: 32°06′32″N 118°57′34″E

Nanjing University Xianlin Campus 南大仙林校区
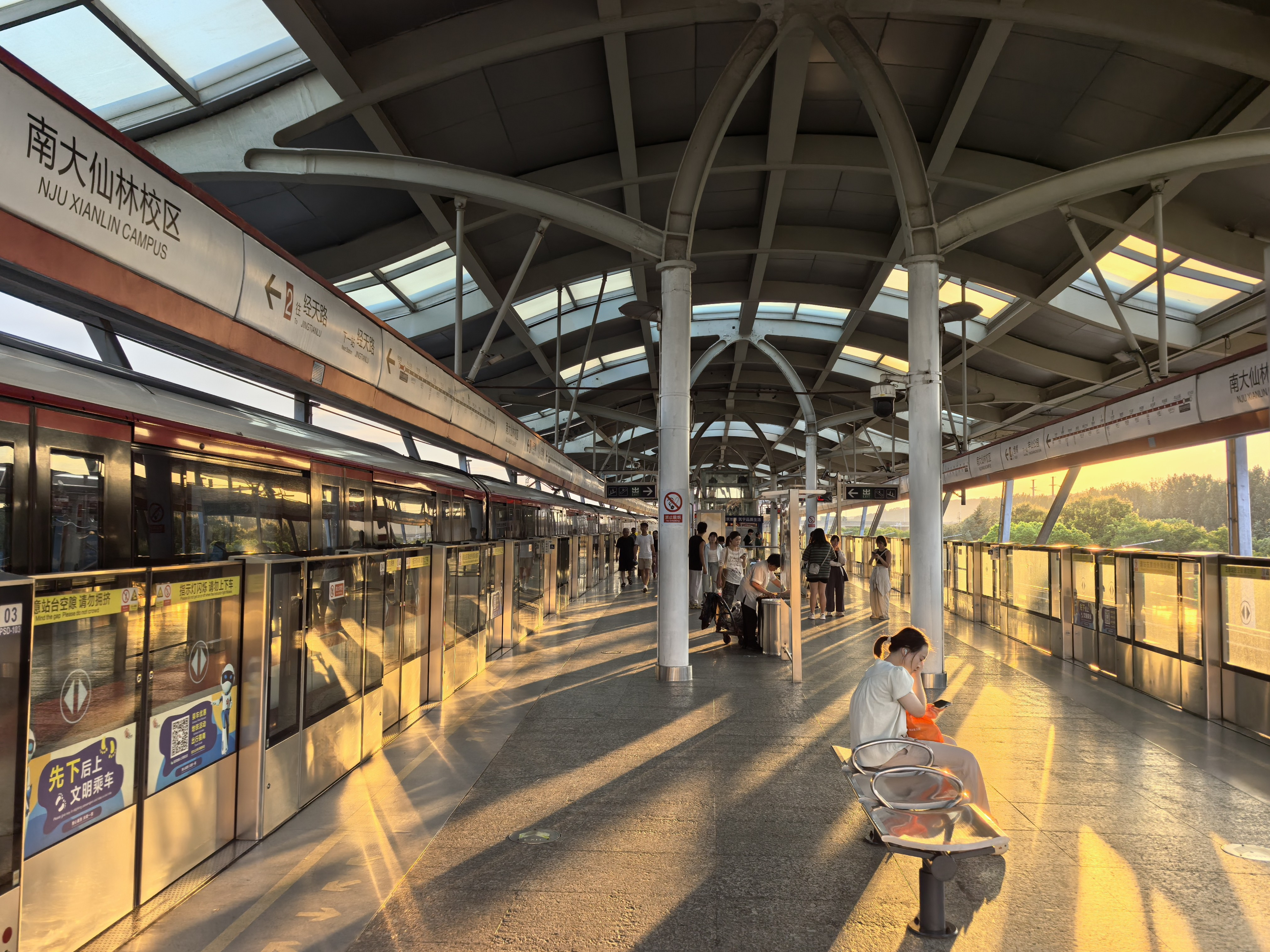

Chinese name
- Simplified Chinese: 南大仙林校区站
- Traditional Chinese: 南大仙林校區站
Transcriptions
Standard Mandarin
- Hanyu Pinyin: Nándà Xiānlín Xiàoqū Zhàn

General information
- Location: Xianlin Avenue (仙林大道); Qixia District, Nanjing, Jiangsu; China
- Operated by: Nanjing Metro Co. Ltd.
- Line: Line 2

Construction
- Structure type: Elevated

Other information
- Station code: 229

History
- Opened: 28 May 2010

Services
Preceding station	Nanjing Metro	Following station
Yangshangongyuan towards Yuzui	Line 2	Jingtianlu Terminus
Location

Nanjing University Xianlin Campus station (Chinese: 南大仙林校区站) is a station of Line 2 of the Nanjing Metro. It started operations on 28 May 2010 along with the rest of Line 2. The station is decorated with an International Workers' Day theme.
