= Xiamafang station =

Nanjing Metro station

Coordinates: 32°02′15″N 118°50′54″E

Xiamafang 下马坊

General information
- Location: Xuanwu District, Nanjing, Jiangsu; China
- Operator: Nanjing Metro Co. Ltd.
- Line: Line 2

Construction
- Structure type: Underground

Other information
- Station code: 220

History
- Opened: 28 May 2010

Services
Preceding station	Nanjing Metro	Following station
Muxuyuan towards Yuzui	Line 2	Xiaolingwei towards Jingtianlu
Location

Xiamafang station (Chinese: 下马坊站; pinyin: Xiàmǎfāng Zhàn), formerly Xiaoweijie station (simplified Chinese: 小卫街站; traditional Chinese: 小衛街站; pinyin: Xiǎowèijiē Zhàn) during planning until 2007, is a station of Line 2 of the Nanjing Metro. It started operations on 28 May 2010 along with the rest of Line 2.

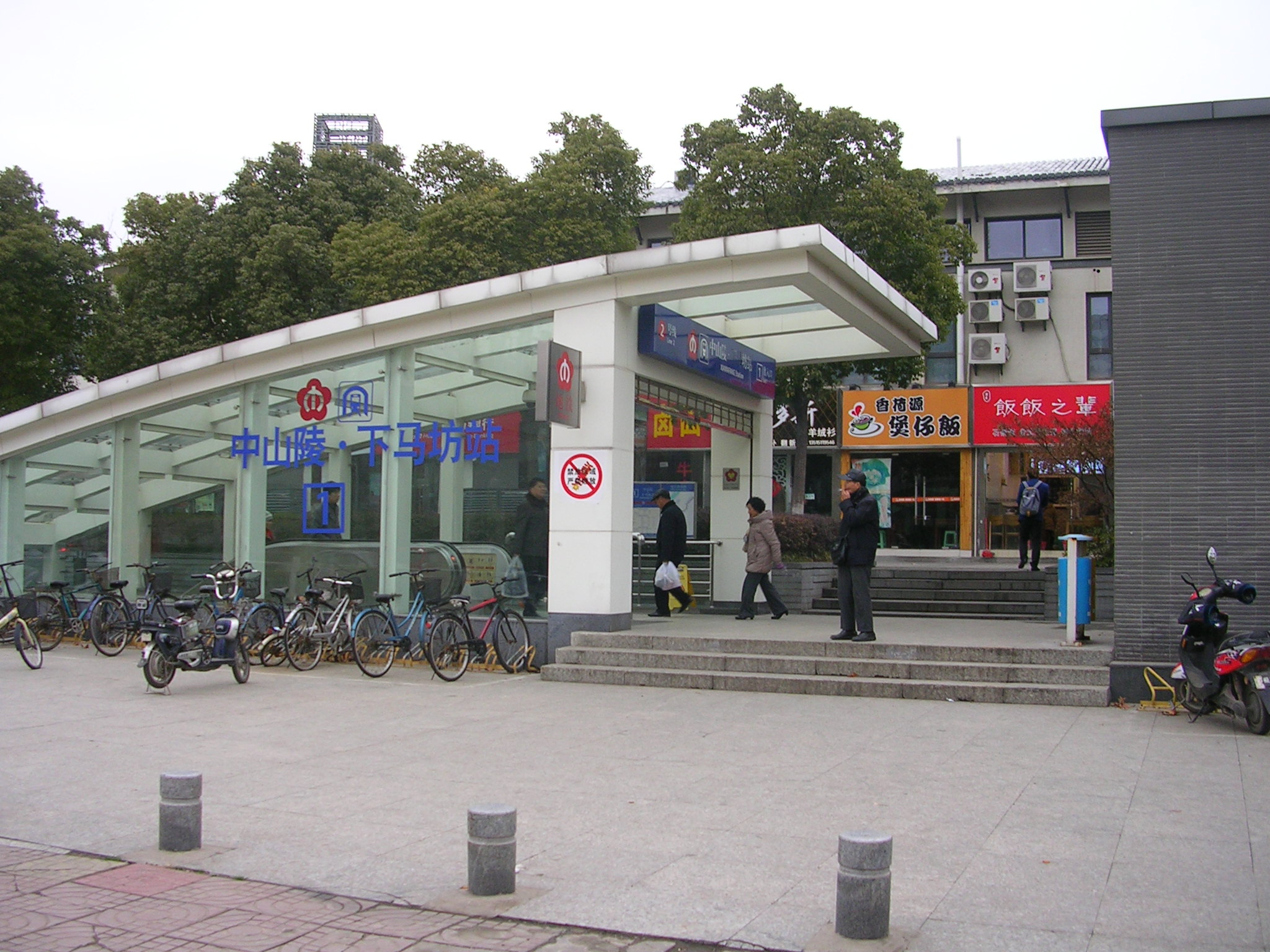
Entrance

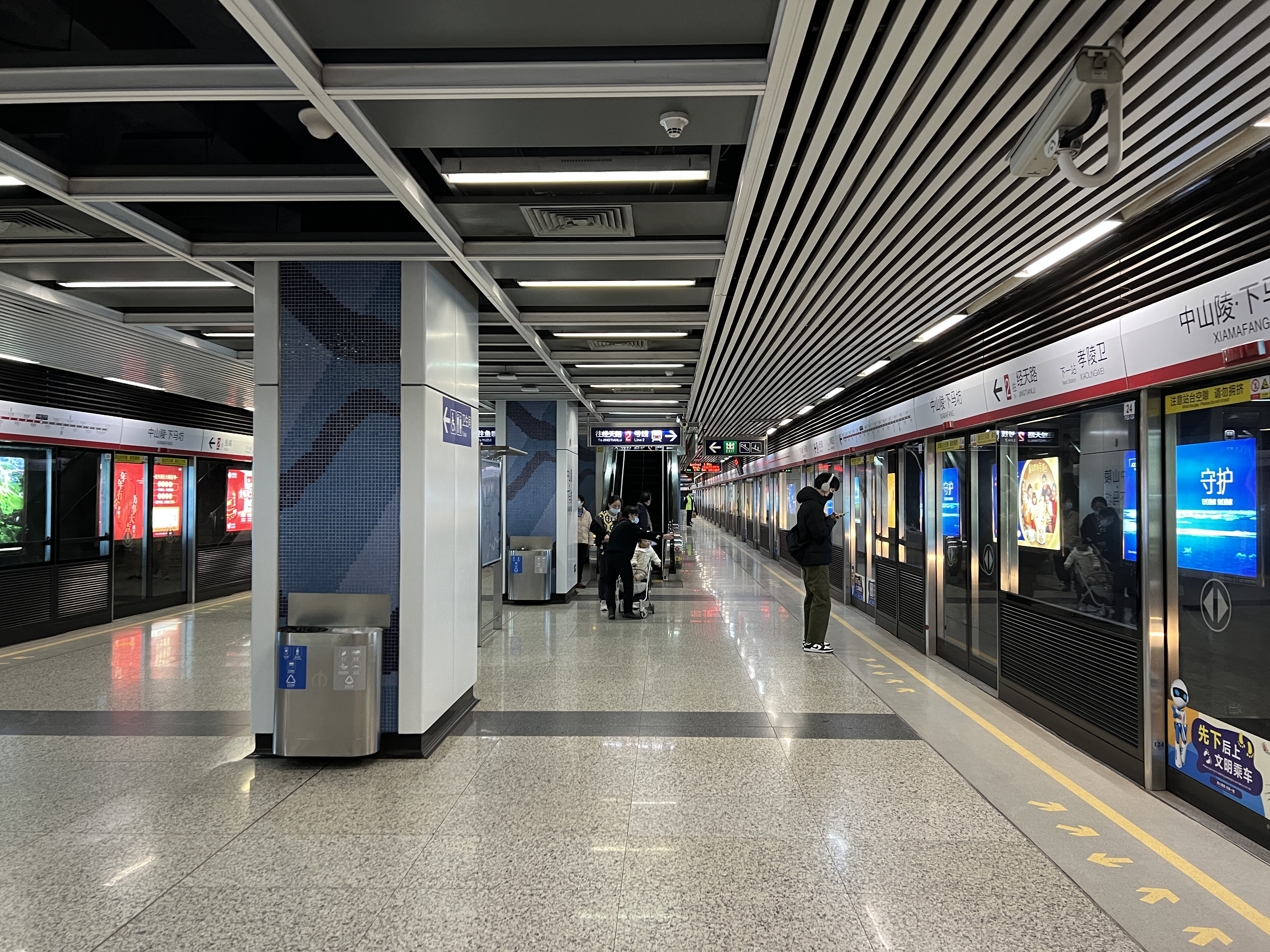
Platform
