= Minggugong station =

Nanjing Metro station

Minggugong 明故宫

General information
- Location: Zhongshan East Road; Qinhuai District, Nanjing, Jiangsu; China
- Coordinates: 32°02′22″N 118°49′09″E
- Operator: Nanjing Metro Co. Ltd.
- Line: Line 2

Construction
- Structure type: Underground

Other information
- Station code: 218

History
- Opened: 28 May 2010

Services
Preceding station	Nanjing Metro	Following station
Xi'anmen towards Yuzui	Line 2	Muxuyuan towards Jingtianlu
Location

Minggugong station (simplified Chinese: 明故宫站; traditional Chinese: 明故宮站; pinyin: Mínggùgōng Zhàn; lit. 'Ming Former Palace Station') is a station of Line 2 of the Nanjing Metro. It started operations on 28 May 2010 along with the rest of Line 2.

The station is traditionally decorated using red and yellow and has a theme of Double Ninth Festival.

== Around the station ==
- Ming Palace
- Nanjing Museum
