= Maqun station =

Nanjing Metro station

Coordinates: 32°02′58″N 118°53′40″E

Maqun 马群
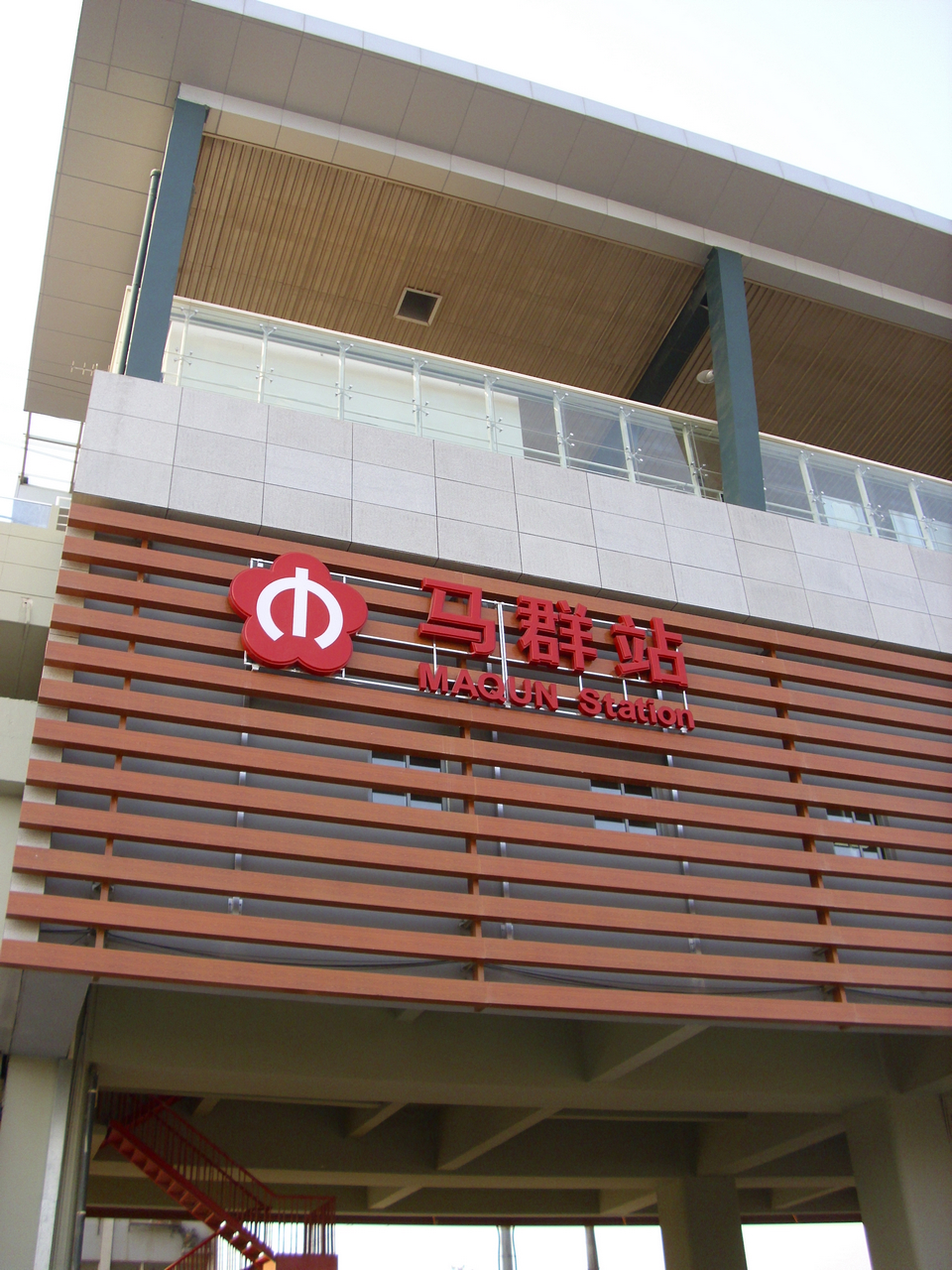

General information
- Location: Qixia District, Nanjing, Jiangsu; China
- Operated by: Nanjing Metro Co. Ltd.
- Lines: Line 2 Line S6

Construction
- Structure type: Elevated (Line 2); Underground (Line S6)

Other information
- Station code: 223

History
- Opened: 28 May 2010 (Line 2); 28 December 2021 (Line S6)

Services
Preceding station	Nanjing Metro	Following station
Zhonglingjie towards Yuzui	Line 2	Jinmalu towards Jingtianlu
Terminus	Line S6	Baishuiqiao towards Jurong
Location

Maqun station (simplified Chinese: 马群站; traditional Chinese: 馬群站; pinyin: Mǎqún Zhàn) is a station of Line 2 and Line S6 of the Nanjing Metro. It started operations on 28 May 2010 along with the rest of Line 2. The theme of this station's decorations is the New Year.
