= Line 2 (Nanjing Metro) =

Metro line in Nanjing, China

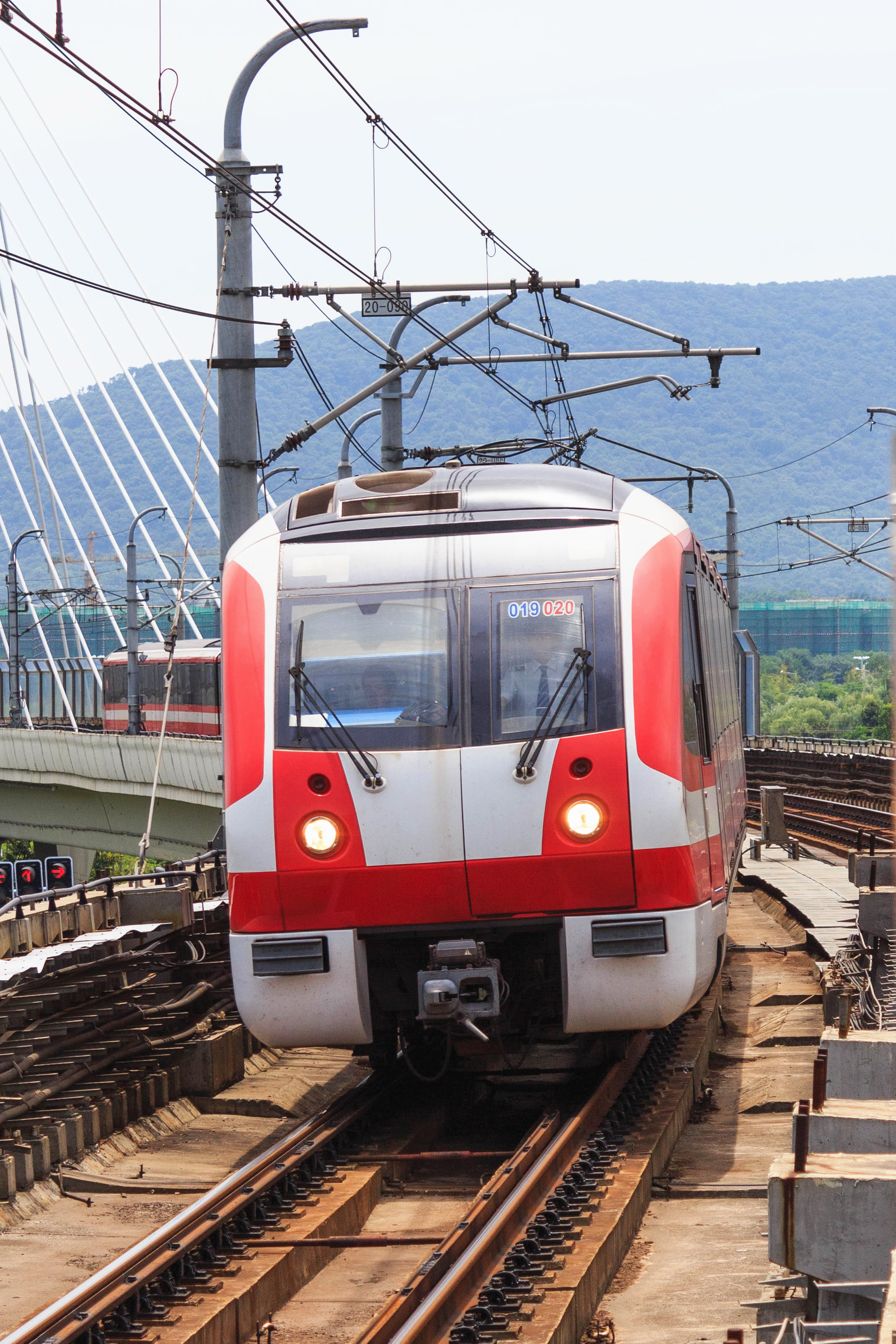
- A line 2 train approaching Xianhemen station

Overview
- Other name: Maqun Line
- Status: In operation
- Locale: Qixia, Xuanwu, Qinhuai, Gulou, and Jianye districts Nanjing, Jiangsu
- Termini: Yuzui; Jingtianlu
- Stations: 30

Service
- Type: Rapid transit
- Rolling stock: Alstom Metropolis
- Daily ridership: 526,000 (2014 Avg.); 1.064 million (2019 Peak)

History
- Opened: May 28, 2010; 15 years ago

Technical
- Line length: 43.35 km (26.94 mi)
- Number of tracks: 2
- Character: Underground, ground level, and elevated
- Track gauge: 1,435 mm (4 ft 8 1/2 in)

Line 2 of the Nanjing Metro (Chinese: 南京地铁2号线; pinyin: Nánjīng Dìtiě ÈrHào Xiàn) is a subway line that runs mainly in an east-west direction on the Nanjing Metro network, running from Jingtianlu to Youfangqiao; it entered operation on May 28, 2010. It covers a length of 37.95 km (23.58 mi) with 26 stations. Of the 26 stations, 17 stations are underground, 2 stations are on the surface, and the other 7 station are either above ground or elevated stations.

The section between Maqun and Jingtianlu was originally planned as an east extension of Line 2, but it entered operation, together with the main line, on the same day.

== Opening timeline ==
Segment	Commencement	Length	Station(s)	Name
Youfangqiao — Jingtianlu	28 May 2010	37.95 km (23.58 mi)	26	Initial phase & Eastern extension
Yuzui - Youfangqiao	28 Dec 2021	5.4 km (3.4 mi)	4	Western extension

== Stations ==
Station name		Connections	Distance km		Location
English	Chinese	Connections	Distance km		Location
Yuzui	鱼嘴	Hexi Tram	---	0.000	Jianye
Tianbaojie	天保街		0.446	0.446	Jianye
Qinglianjie	青莲街		1.058	1.504	Jianye
Luotanglu	螺塘路	7	0.672	2.176	Jianye
Youfangqiao	油坊桥	S3	1.103	3.279	Jianye
Yurundajie	雨润大街		2.631	5.910	Jianye
Yuantong	元通	10; Hexi Tram	1.622	7.532	Jianye
Olympic Stadium East	奥体东	Hexi Tram (via Olympic East)	1.262	8.794	Jianye
Xinglongdajie	兴隆大街		1.379	10.173	Jianye
Jiqingmendajie	集庆门大街		1.473	11.464	Jianye
Yunjinlu	云锦路		1.312	12.958	Jianye
Mochouhu	莫愁湖	7	1.257	14.215	Jianye
Hanzhongmen	汉中门		1.002	15.217	Gulou / Qinhuai
Shanghailu	上海路	5	0.874	16.091	Gulou / Qinhuai
Xinjiekou	新街口	1	0.745	16.836	Gulou / Qinhuai / Xuanwu
Daxinggong	大行宫	3	1.022	17.858	Qinhuai / Xuanwu
Xi'anmen	西安门		1.024	18.882	Qinhuai / Xuanwu
Minggugong	明故宫	6	1.300	20.182	Qinhuai / Xuanwu
Muxuyuan	苜蓿园		1.521	21.703	Xuanwu
Xiamafang	下马坊		1.307	23.010	Xuanwu
Xiaolingwei	孝陵卫		0.937	23.947	Xuanwu
Zhonglingjie	钟灵街		1.168	25.115	Xuanwu
Maqun	马群	S6; Qilin Tram	2.779	27.894	Qixia
Jinmalu	金马路	4	3.015	30.909	Qixia
Xianhemen	仙鹤门		1.675	32.584	Qixia / Xuanwu
Xuezelu	学则路		1.326	33.910	Qixia
Xianlinzhongxin	仙林中心		1.519	35.429	Qixia
Yangshangongyuan	羊山公园		1.066	36.495	Qixia
NJU Xianlin Campus	南大仙林校区		1.947	38.442	Qixia
Jingtianlu	经天路		1.846	40.288	Qixia
