= Hexi tram =

One of two tramlines that serve the city of Nanjing, China

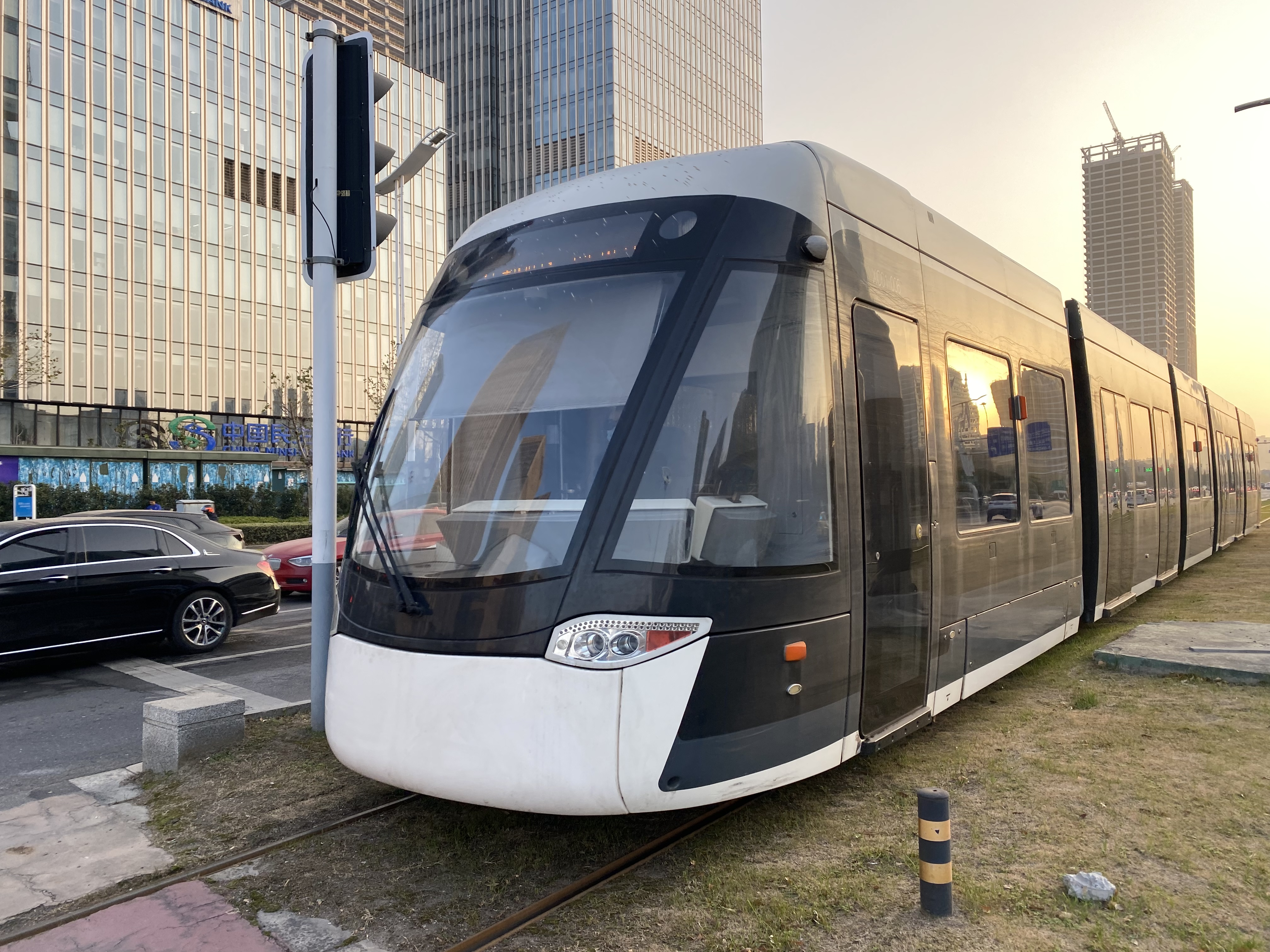
Hexi tram in 2023

The Hexi tram (opened in 2014) is one of two tramlines that serve the city of Nanjing, China. These lines are part of the Nanjing tram network, which is an above-ground trolley system in Nanjing. The tram began its first trial run on August 13. The tram was built as part of infrastructure works for the 2014 Summer Youth Olympics.

== Overview ==
The Hexi tram begins at the Nanjing Metro Line 2 Olympic Stadium East station. The terminus is located in Yuzui Wetlands Park area in southern Hexi New District.

The tram runs completely at ground level and features eco-friendly technologies and many modern amenities which include an on-board storage battery, and a pantograph charging system at each of its stations.

The Hexi tram covers 7.76 km (4.82 mi) with a total of 13 stations that intersect in four points with Nanjing's existing metro lines.

On 6 May 2021, service of Hexi tram was temporarily suspended to allow construction of Metro Line 2 western extension. Later in October 2021, service was partly resumed, with Qinxinlu and Baoshuangjiedong stations remain suspended.

In May 2024, with renovation of dual tracks, Yuzui (formerly Qinxinlu) and Baoshuangjiedong stations have announced the resumption of operation. The resumption has postponed to 15 September due to further testing.

== Stations ==
All stations are located in Jianye District.

Map of Nanjing Hexi Tram

Station name		Connections
English	Chinese	Connections
Yuzui	鱼嘴	2
Baoshuangjiedong	保双街东	
Baoshuangjie	保双街	
Tianbaojie	天保街	
Longwangdajie	龙王大街	
Wuhoujie	吴侯街	S3
Pingliangdajie	平良大街	S3
Youyijie	友谊街	
Jiangshandajie	江山大街	
Convention and Exhibition Center	博览中心东门	
Yuantong	元通	2 10
Fuchunjiangxijie	富春江西街	
Olympic East	奥体中心东门	2 (via Olympic Stadium East)
