= Nanjing Botanical Garden, Memorial Sun Yat-Sen =

Botanical garden in Nanjing, China

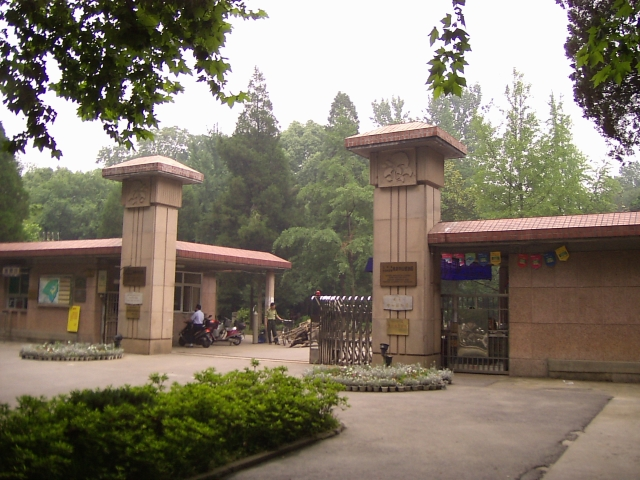

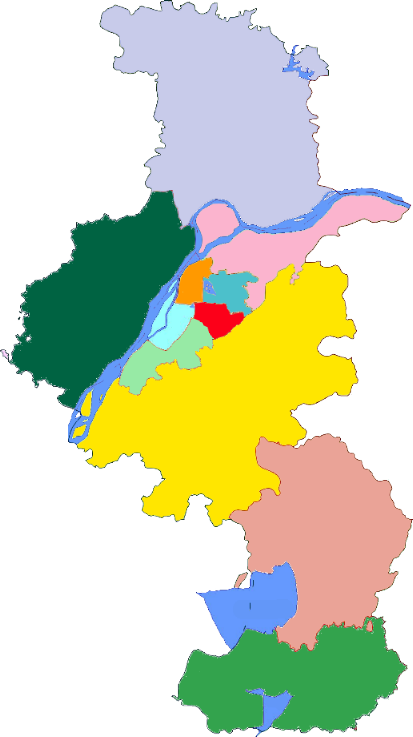
- Location within Nanjing
- Type: Public
- Location: Xuanwu District, Nanjing, Jiangsu
- Nearest city: Nanjing
- Coordinates: 32°03′26″N 118°49′51″E
- Area: 459.616 acres (186.000 ha)
- Created: 1929
- Status: Open year round

The Nanjing Botanical Garden Memorial Sun Yat-Sen (Chinese: 南京中山植物园; pinyin: Nánjīng Zhōngshān Zhíwùyúan), established in 1929, became the first national botanical garden in China. The original name, 'Botanical Garden Memorial Sun Yat-Sen', commemorated Dr. Sun Yat-Sen, the pioneer of Chinese democratic revolution. In 1954, it was renamed as Nanjing Botanical Garden Mem. Sun Yat-Sen, Chinese Academy of Sciences. It is one of four major botanical gardens in China. The botanical garden is also known as Zhongshan Botanical Garden after the spelling of its name in pinyin.

== Location ==
Located in the eastern suburbs of Nanjing, with the Purple Mountain behind and the Qian Lake in front, the garden lies beside the ancient city wall of Ming Dynasty nearby the famous Sun Yat-sen Mausoleum. The gardens cover 1.86 square kilometers (186 ha). With luxuriant vegetation, lawns, hills and lakes, Nanjing Botanical Garden is a center for botanical research and science education, as well as a popular recreational attraction. CIty bus lines 20 and 315 stop at the front gate.

== Collection ==
As a research center on central and northern subtropical floras of China, the garden has a living collection of about 3,000 species belonging to 913 genera of 188 families. The Herbarium holds 700,000 sheets of botanical specimens. There are five research departments: Ornamental Plant Research Center, Medicinal Plant Research Center, Plant Information Center, Key Laboratory of Plant Ex-situ Conservation of Jiangsu Province and the Herbarium. Ten featured gardens (sections) have been constructed and opened.

Nanjing Botanical Garden has set up an exchange program of seeds, plants, specimens and books with over six hundred organizations of more than sixty countries worldwide. The sister relationship of botanical gardens was established with the Missouri Botanical Garden, USA, which is the first of its type in China. Friendly relationships with the UBC Botanical Garden, Canada and the Botanical Garden, University of Tokyo, Japan have been set up. The garden is a member of the International Union for Conservation of Nature (IUCN) Threatened Plant Committee and Botanic Gardens Conservation International.

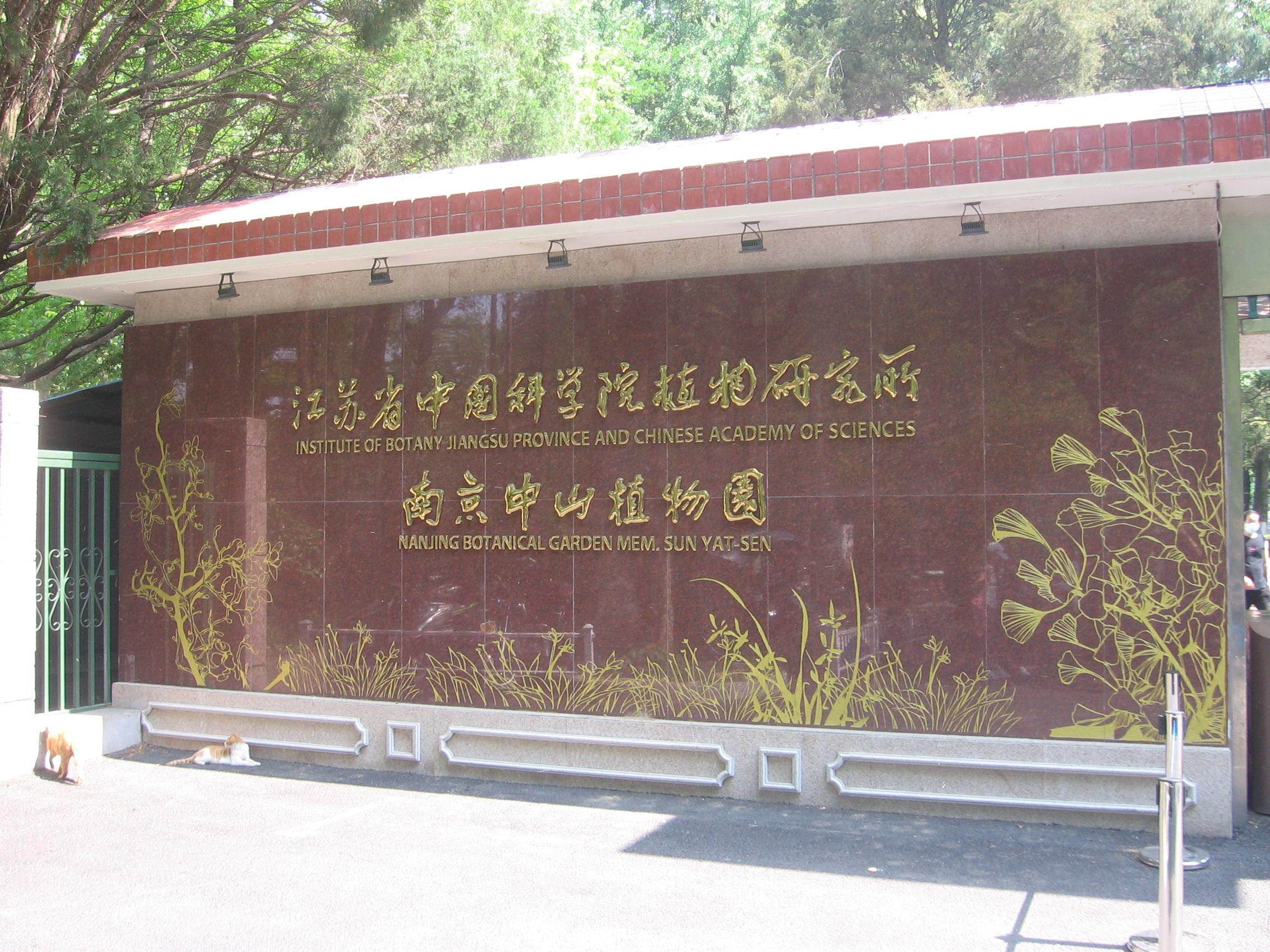
Main Entrance

== Transportation ==
The garden is accessible north from Muxuyuan station (苜蓿园) of Nanjing Metro Line 2. Take city bus 20 from this station. Or from the Jimingsi station (鸡鸣寺) (Line 3) stops at the main entrance.
