= Qixia, Nanjing =

Qixia 栖霞区
- District
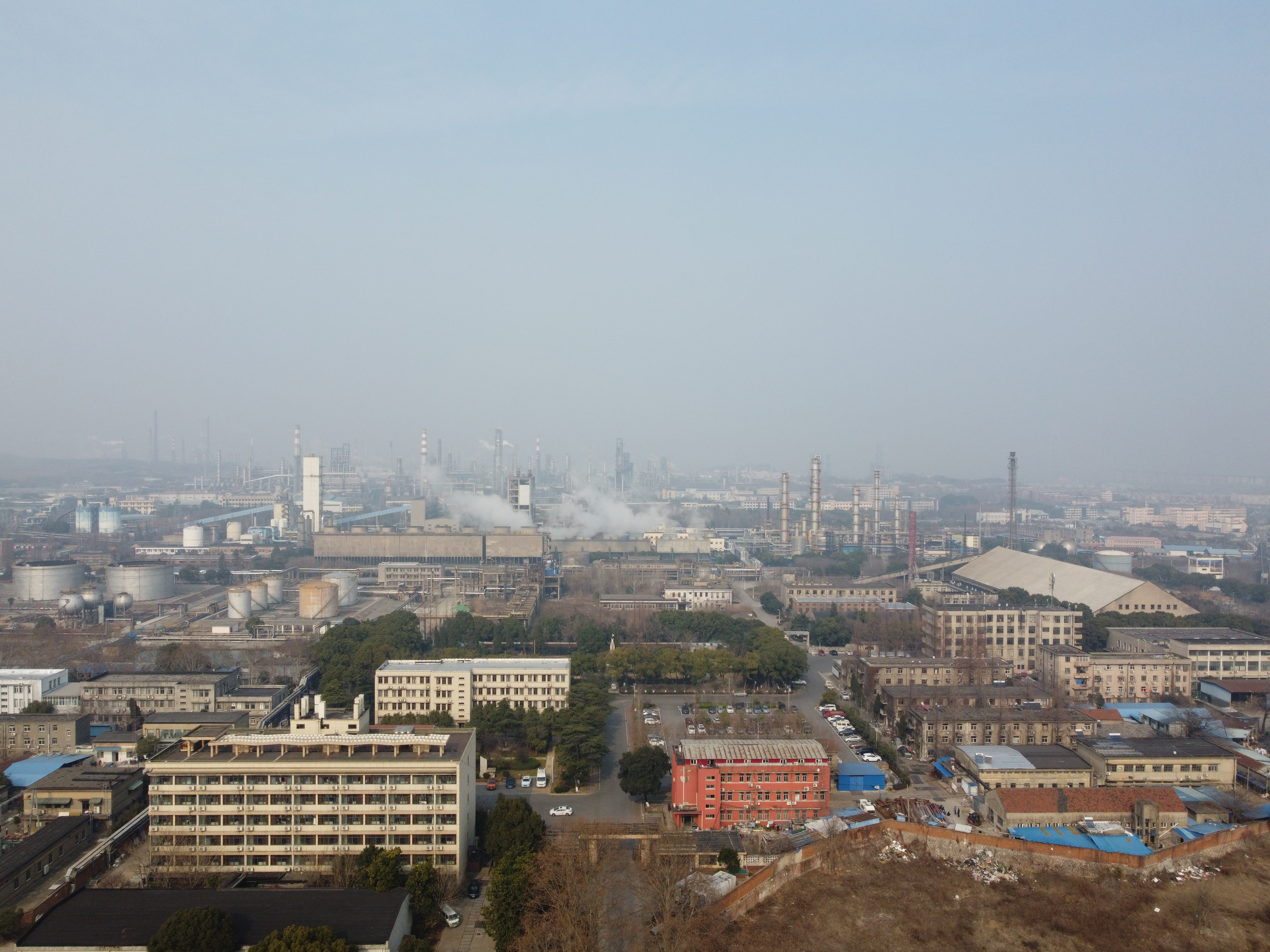

- Location in Jiangsu
- Coordinates: 32°08′07″N 119°00′12″E
- Country: People's Republic of China
- Province: Jiangsu
- Sub-provincial city: Nanjing

Area
  - Total: 395.44 km^{2} (152.68 sq mi)

Population (2019)
  - Total: 735,900
  - Density: 1,861/km^{2} (4,820/sq mi)
- Time zone: UTC+8 (China Standard)
- Postal code: 210046
Nanjing district map
Subdivisions of Nanjing, Jiangsu
City Proper
1	Xuanwu
2	Qinhuai
3	Jianye
4	Gulou
5	Yuhuatai
6	Qixia
Suburban
7	Jiangning
8	Pukou
9	Luhe
Rural
10	Lishui
11	Gaochun

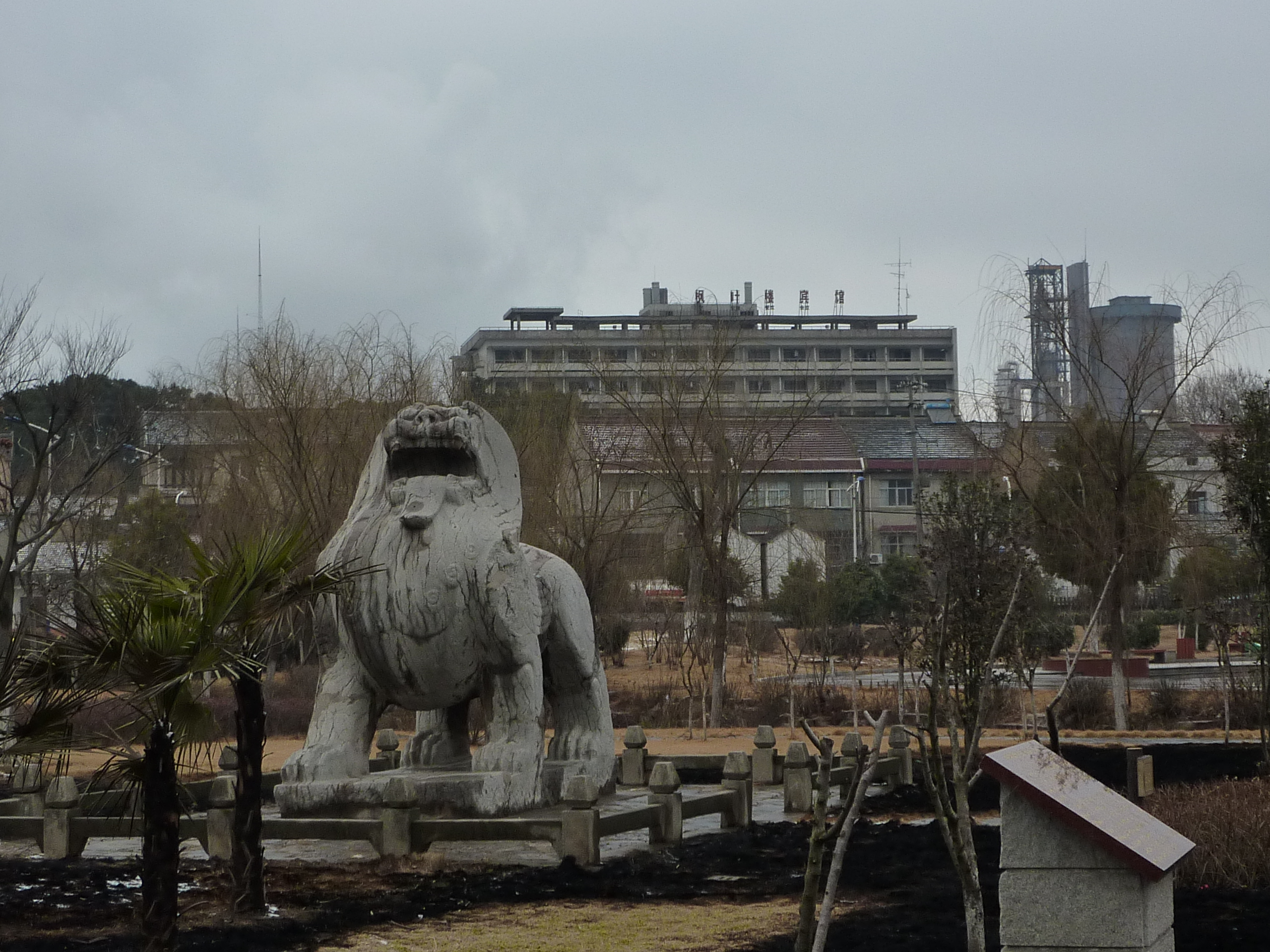
A bixie (winged lion) at the tomb of Xiao Hui, seen against the background of Ganjiaxiang, an industrial section of Qixia District

Western Part of Qixia District

Qixia District (simplified Chinese: 栖霞区; traditional Chinese: 棲霞區; pinyin: Qīxiá Qū) is one of 11 districts of Nanjing, the capital of Jiangsu province, China, straddling both sides of the Yangtze River.

It has an area of 80 km^{2} and a population of 400,000.

== Natural and historical sites ==
Qixia Mountain is in Qixia District. Qixia Temple, a Southern Tang Buddhist temple, is there. During the Qing dynasty, the Qianlong Emperor praised it as the most elegant mountain in Jinling.

A number of Liang dynasty tombs are in the district, primarily in and around the Ganjiaxiang section of the district. Among them, particularly well known is that of Xiao Xiu (475–518), containing one of the best surviving sets of the period's statuary.

== Geography ==
Qixia District includes northern and northeastern parts of the greater Nanjing area, on the right (southeastern) side of the Yangtze River.

== Administration divisions ==
Qixia District administers 10 subdistricts. They are:

=== Subdistricts ===
- Yaohua (尧化街道)
- Maigaoqiao (迈皋桥街道)
- Yanziji (燕子矶街道)
- Maqun (马群街道)
- Qixia (栖霞街道)
- Xigang (西岗街道)
- Xianlin (仙林街道)
- Longtan (龙潭街道) - is upgraded from town.
- Jing'an (靖安街道) - is upgraded from town.
- Baguazhou (八卦洲街道) - is upgraded from town.

== Economy ==
Qixia Town is an important land and water transport hub. It is connected to the Shanghai-Nanjing Railway. The No. 312 National Highway and Qixia Highway runs through it.

It is also connected to the adjacent Second Yangtze River Bridge and Xinshengwei Port to the west, and Shanghai-Nanjing Expressway to the south, opposite the Yangtze River to the north, and east of Longtan Deep Water Port.

== Education ==
Qixia district is the location of the Xianlin University City which hosts ten major universities from Jiangsu province.

The Nanjing International School (NIS) is a Pre-K - 12 school for foreign students. The Japanese Weekend School of Nanjing (南京日本語補習授業校 Nankin Nihongo Hoshū Jugyō Kō), a Japanese weekend program, holds its classes at NIS.

== Geography ==
Qixia is 16 km from Nanjing City Central Business District and 40 km from Nanjing Lukou International Airport.
