= Jingtianlu station =

Nanjing Metro station

Coordinates: 32°06′59″N 118°58′38″E

Jingtianlu 经天路
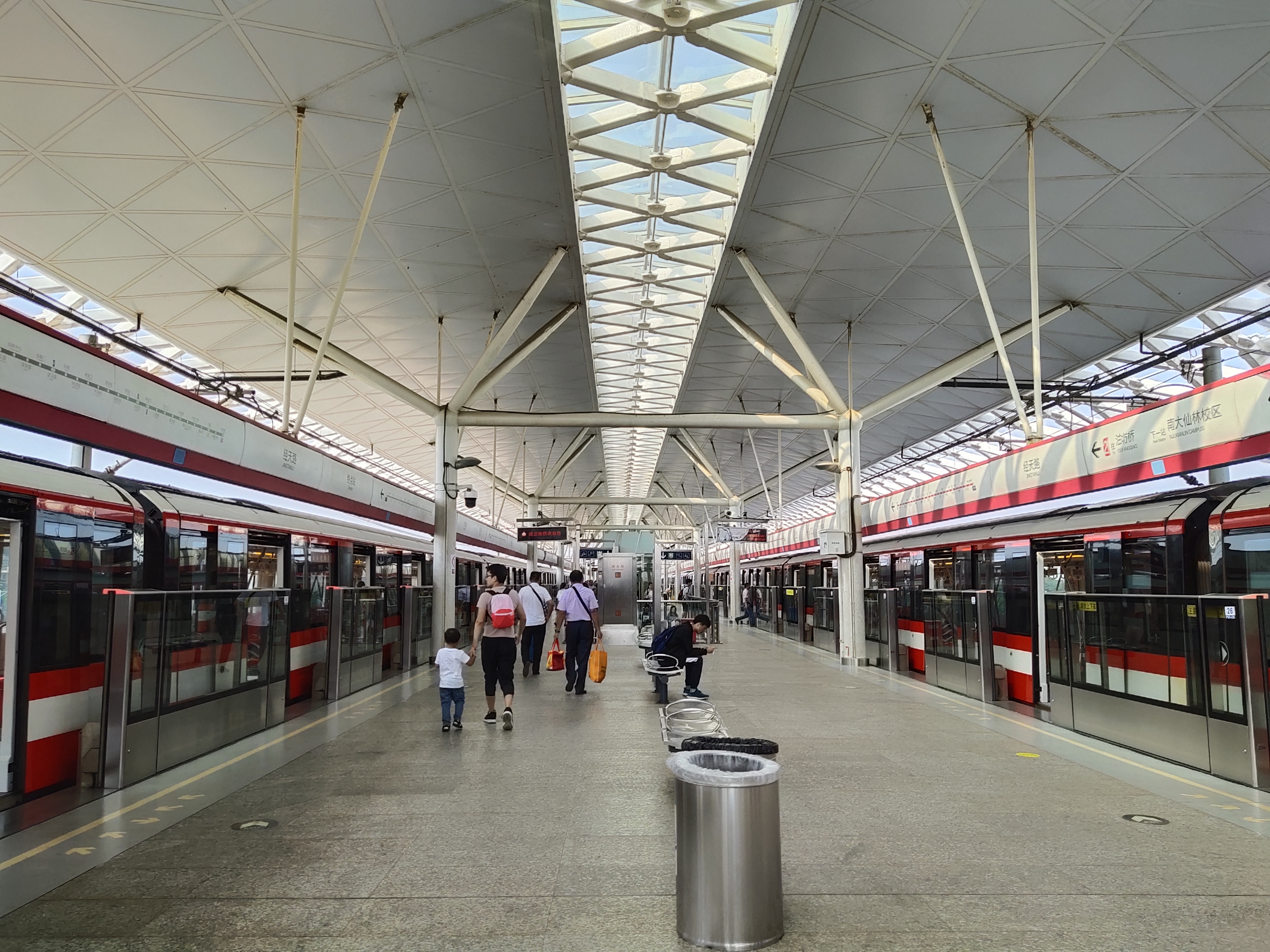

General information
- Location: Xianlin Avenue (仙林大道); Qixia District, Nanjing, Jiangsu; China
- Operated by: Nanjing Metro Co. Ltd.
- Line: Line 2

Construction
- Structure type: Elevated

Other information
- Station code: 230

History
- Opened: 28 May 2010

Services
Preceding station	Nanjing Metro	Following station
NJU Xianlin Campus towards Yuzui	Line 2	Terminus
Location

Jingtianlu station (simplified Chinese: 经天路站; traditional Chinese: 經天路站; pinyin: Jīngtiānlù Zhàn) is a station and the eastern terminus of Line 2 of the Nanjing Metro. It started operations on 28 May 2010 along with the rest of Line 2.

== Gallery ==
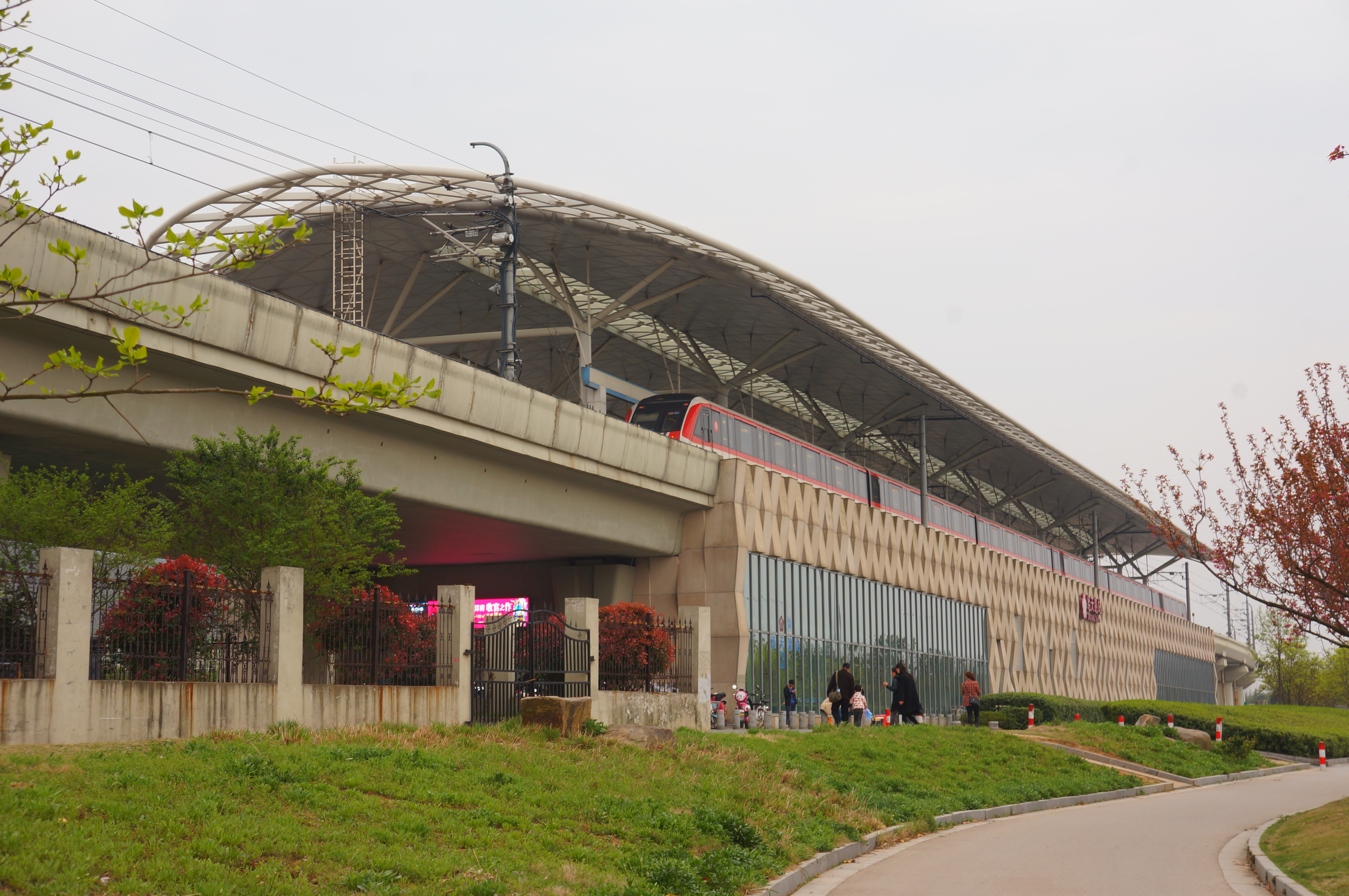
Exterior

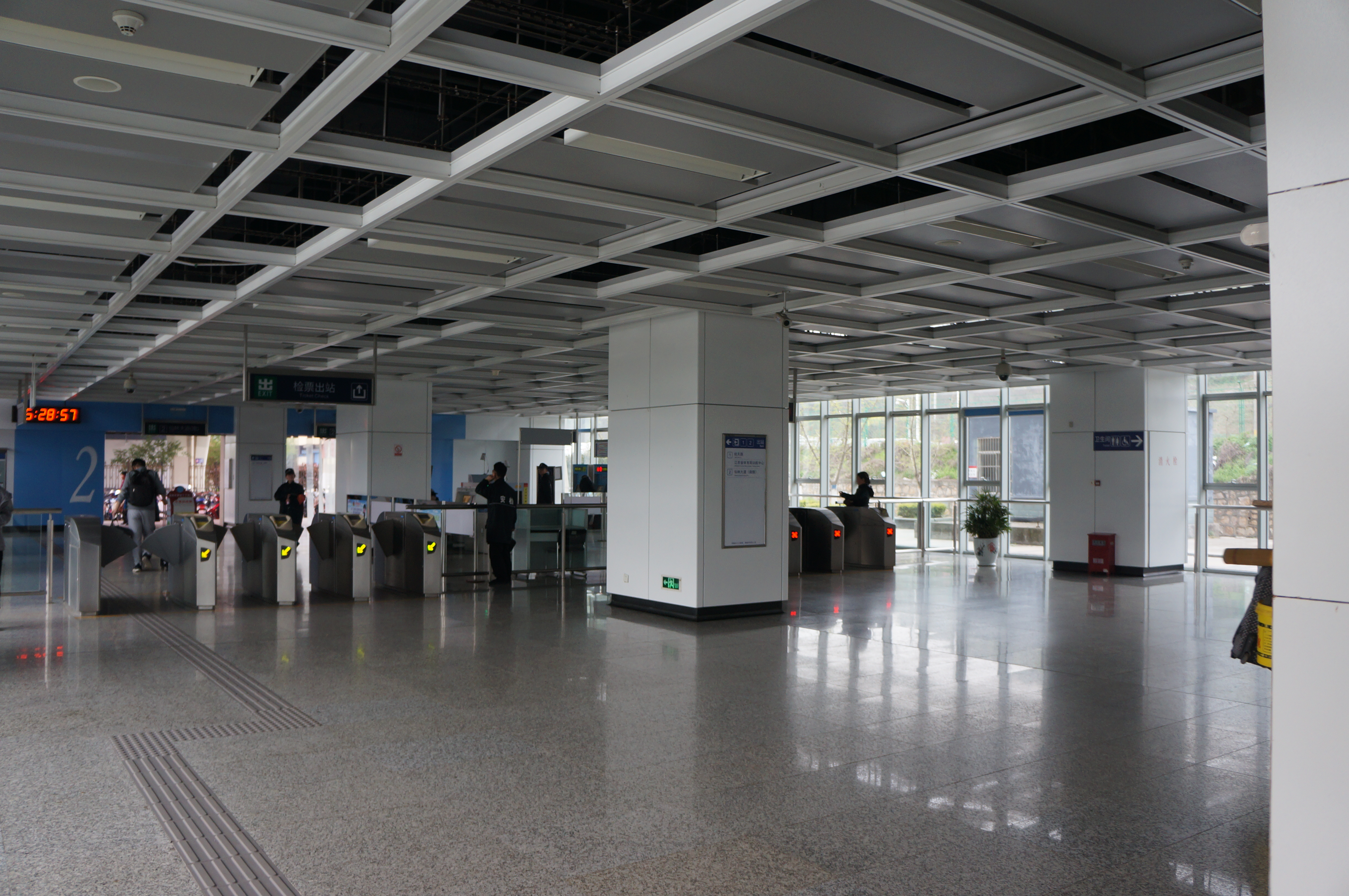
Concourse

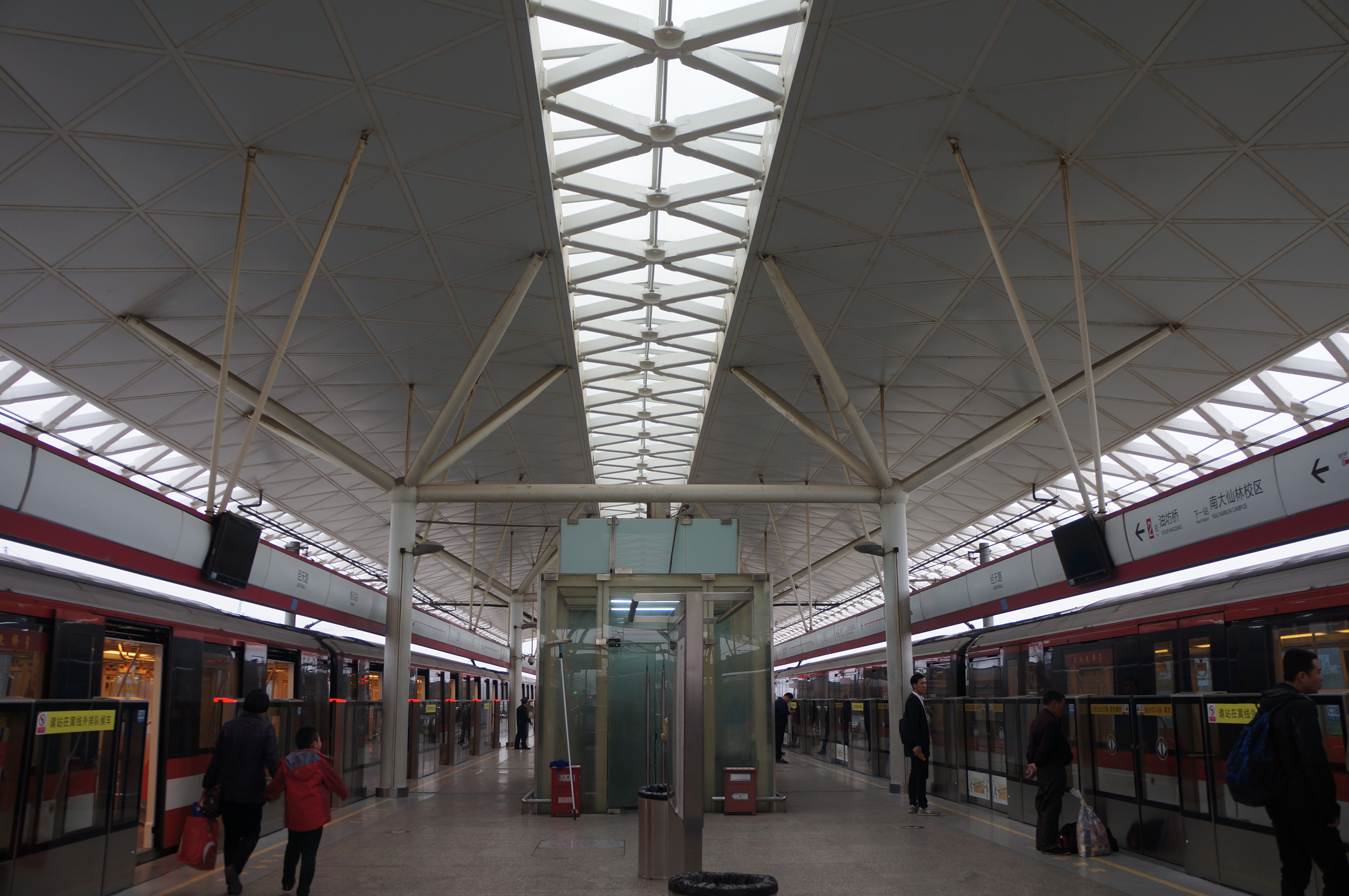
Platform
