= Yuzui station (Nanjing Metro) =

Metro station in Nanjing, China

Yuzui 鱼嘴
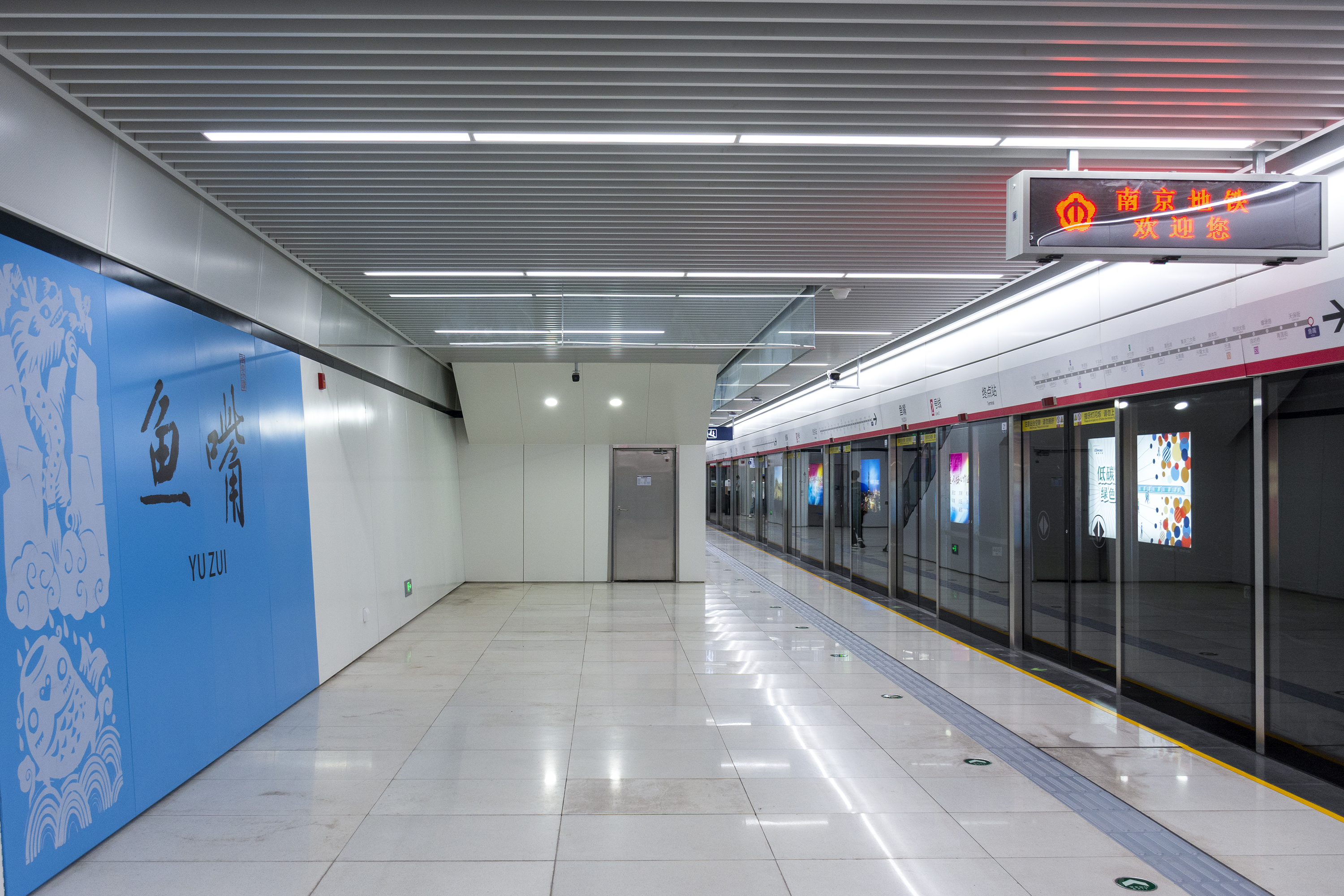
- The arriving platform of this station

General information
- Location: Pukou District, Nanjing, Jiangsu; China
- Coordinates: 31.9690°N 118.6646°E
- Operated by: Nanjing Metro Co. Ltd.
- Lines: Line 2; Line 9 (Planning)

Construction
- Structure type: Underground

Other information
- Station code: 201 (Line 2)

History
- Opened: 28 December 2021

Services
Preceding station	Nanjing Metro	Following station
Terminus	Line 2	Tianbaojie towards Jingtianlu
Location

Yuzui station (Chinese: 鱼嘴站; pinyin: Yúzuǐ zhàn) is a station of Line 2 of the Nanjing Metro. It started operations on 28 December 2021.

It is one of the terminus stations of Line 2, and it is the only station which can't switch direction through paid area.

In the future, with the Line 9 phase 2 open, this station will be an interchange station between Line 2 and Line 9.
