= Gangzicun station =

Metro station in Nanjing, China

Gangzicun 岗子村
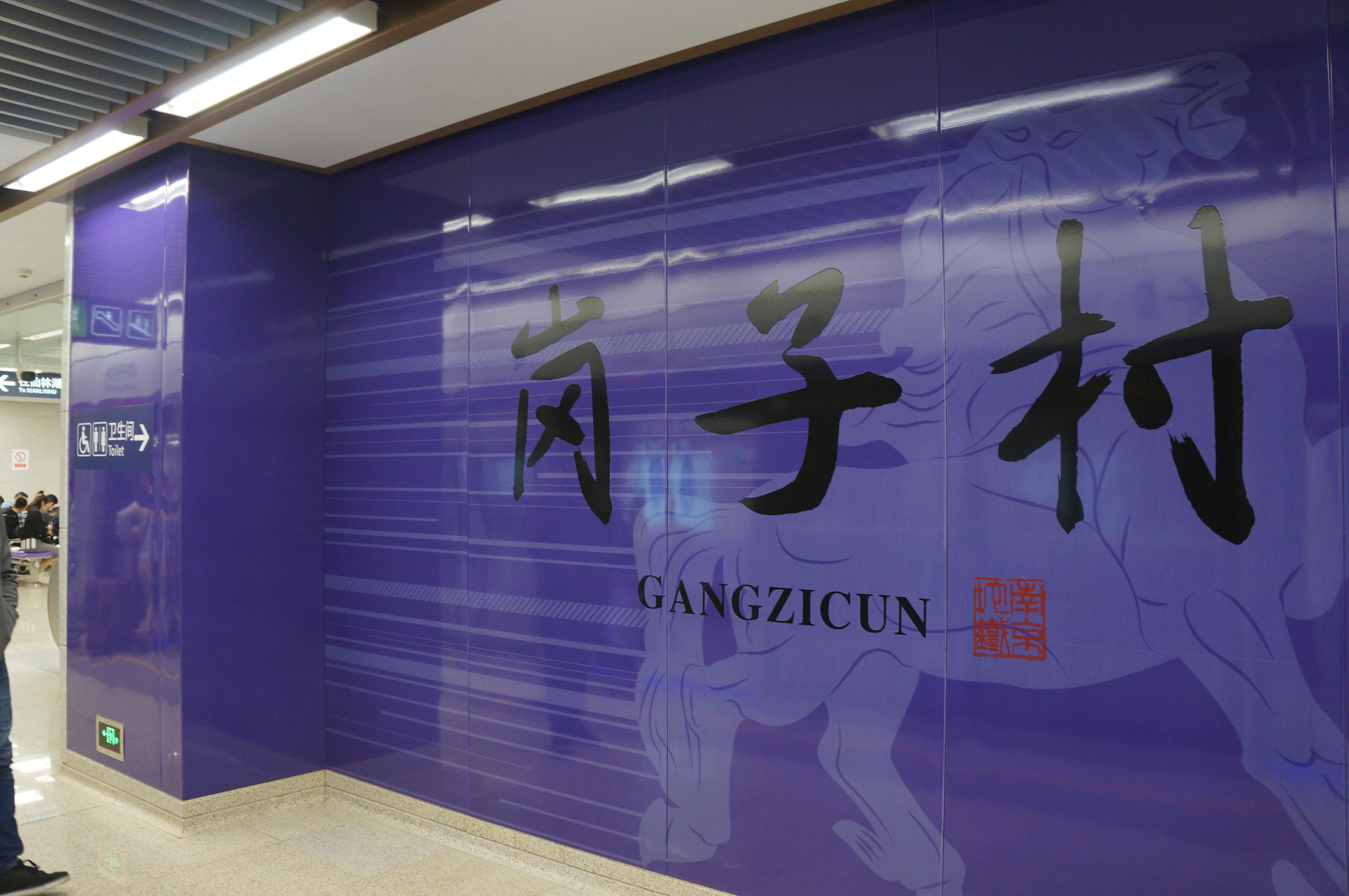

General information
- Location: Xuanwu District, Nanjing, Jiangsu; China
- Operated by: Nanjing Metro Co. Ltd.
- Line: Line 4

Construction
- Structure type: Underground

Other information
- Station code: 412

History
- Opened: 18 January 2017

Services
Preceding station	Nanjing Metro	Following station
Jiuhuashan towards Longjiang	Line 4	Jiangwangmiao towards Xianlinhu
Location

Gangzicun station (simplified Chinese: 岗子村站; traditional Chinese: 崗子村站; pinyin: Gǎngzǐcūn Zhàn) is a station on Line 4 of the Nanjing Metro and is a planned interchange station with the future Line 6. The station is located underneath the intersection of Bancang Street, Longpan Road, and North Anmen Street and is situated between Xuanwu Lake, Purple Mountain, White Horse Park, and the Nanjing Sun Palace. Because of its location, it has been called by local media as "one of the busiest tourist stations".

Construction began in June 2012 and the station opened for passenger service on January 18, 2017 alongside seventeen other stations as part of the first phase of Line 4. On its inaugural day, Gangzicun Station was one of the highest-ridership stations on the newly opened Line 4, along with Longjiang Station and Gulou Station.
