= Jiuhuashan station =

Metro station in Nanjing, China

Jiuhuashan 九华山
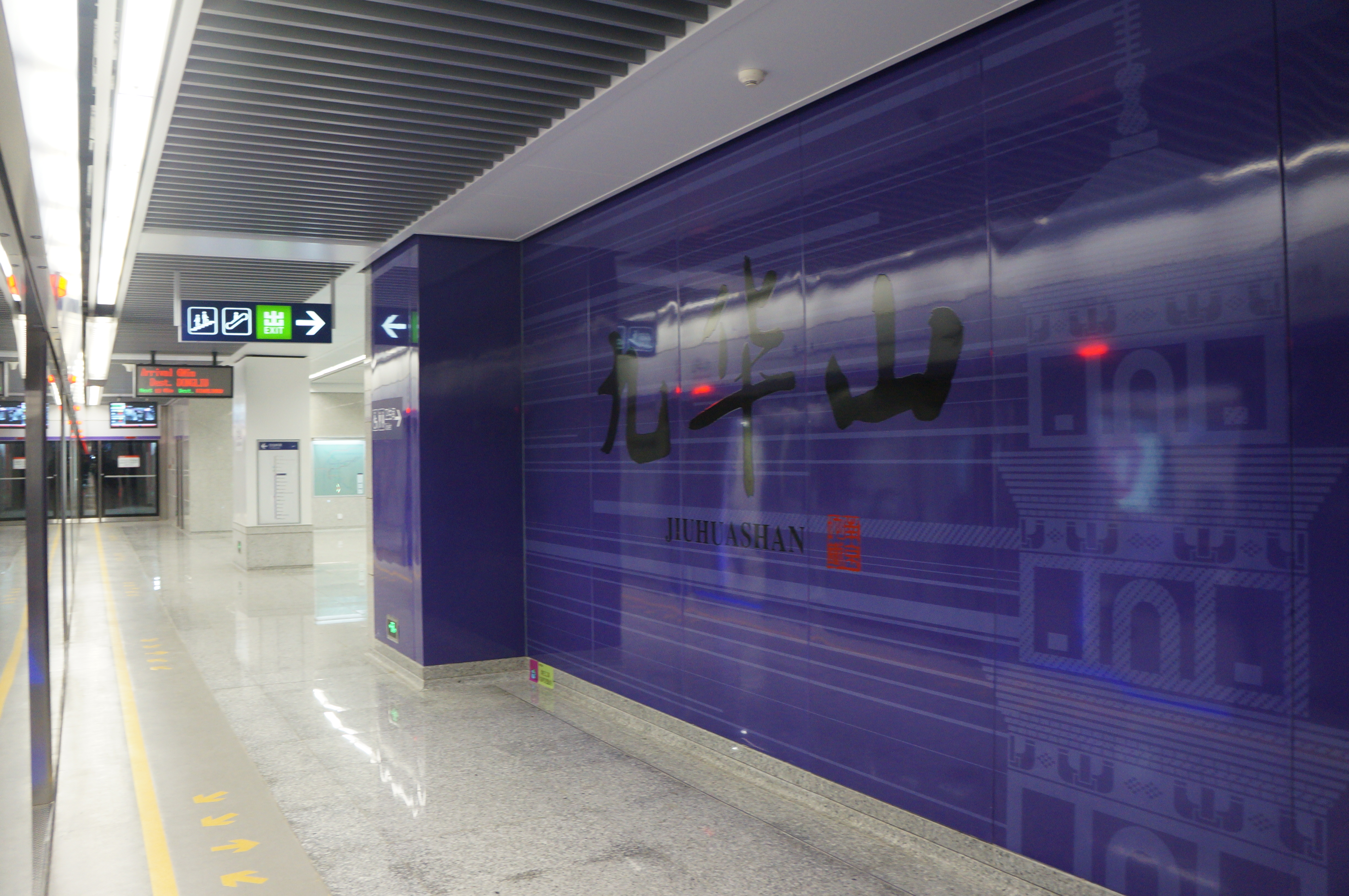

General information
- Location: Xuanwu District, Nanjing, Jiangsu; China
- Operated by: Nanjing Metro Co. Ltd.
- Line: Line 4

Construction
- Structure type: Underground

Other information
- Station code: 413

History
- Opened: 18 January 2017

Services
Preceding station	Nanjing Metro	Following station
Jimingsi towards Longjiang	Line 4	Gangzicun towards Xianlinhu
Location

Jiuhuashan station (simplified Chinese: 九华山站; traditional Chinese: 九華山站; pinyin: Jiǔhuáshān Zhàn) is a station on Line 4 of the Nanjing Metro. The station is located underneath the intersection of Beijing East Road and Jiuhuashan Road. Construction began in June 2012 and completed on January 18, 2017 alongside seventeen other stations as part of the first phase of Line 4. The start of construction was delayed by five months due to difficulty in relocating certain households whose land was required to construct the station.

The station is located just south of Xuanwu Lake and is near White Horse Park and Purple Mountain.
