= Jiangwangmiao station =

Metro station in Nanjing, China

Jiangwangmiao 蒋王庙
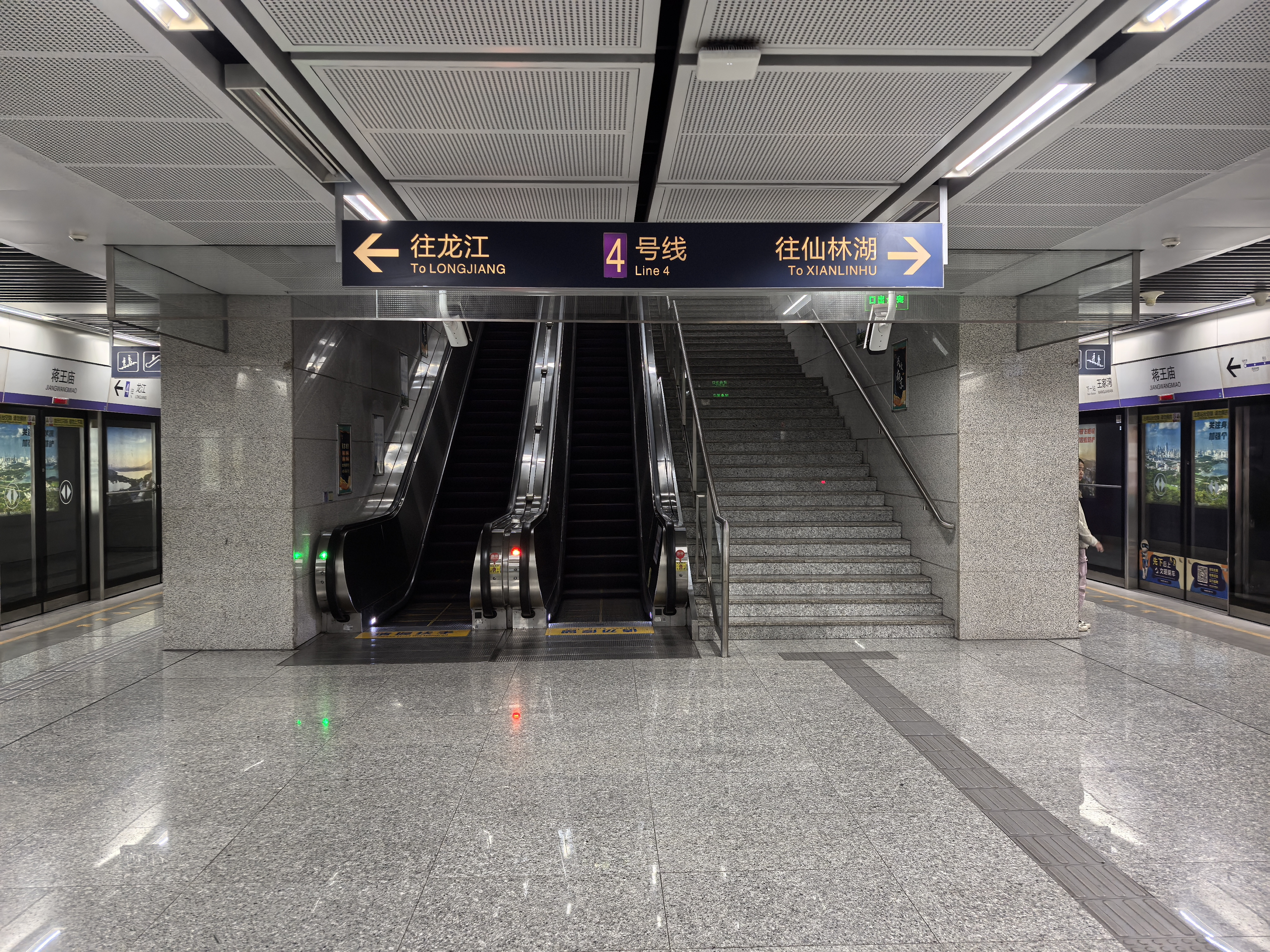

General information
- Location: Xuanwu District, Nanjing, Jiangsu; China
- Coordinates: 32°04′47″N 118°49′34″E
- Operated by: Nanjing Metro Co. Ltd.
- Line: Line 4

Construction
- Structure type: Underground

Other information
- Station code: 411

History
- Opened: 18 January 2017

Services
Preceding station	Nanjing Metro	Following station
Gangzicun towards Longjiang	Line 4	Wangjiawan towards Xianlinhu
Location

Jiangwangmiao station (simplified Chinese: 蒋王庙站; traditional Chinese: 蔣王廟站; pinyin: Jiǎngwángmiào Zhàn) is a station on Line 4 of the Nanjing Metro that opened in January 2017 along with eighteen other stations as part of Line 4's first phase. It is located underneath Jiangwangmiao Avenue on an east–west axis and within walking distance of Purple Mountain. Jiangwangmiao Station was originally named "Yingtuocun" Station during Line 4's planning phase.
