= Xuzhuang station =

Metro station in Nanjing

Coordinates: 32.0874°N 118.8833°E

Xuzhuang 徐庄
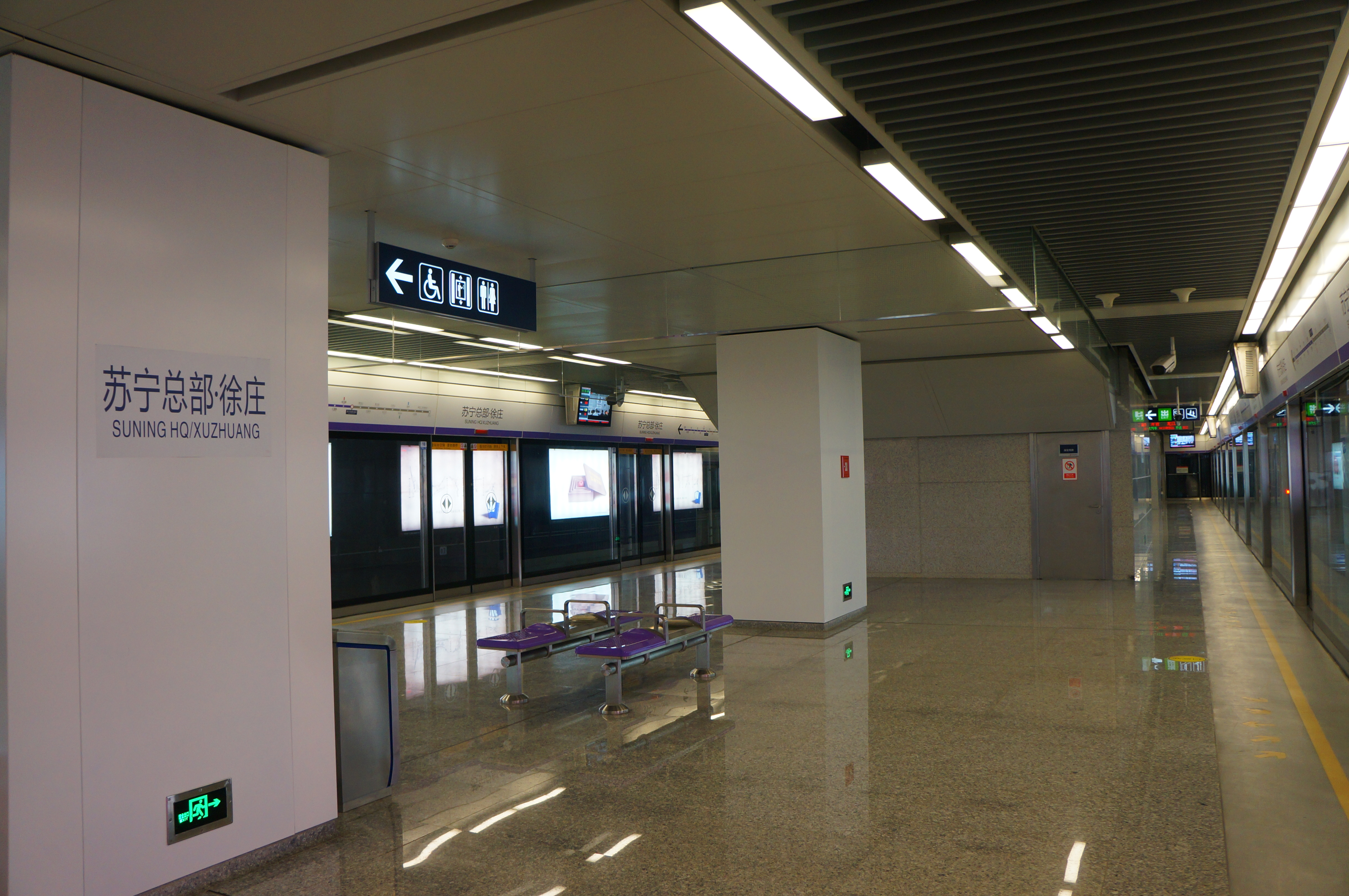

General information
- Location: Xuanwu District, Nanjing, Jiangsu; China
- Operator: Nanjing Metro Co. Ltd.
- Line: Line 4

Construction
- Structure type: Underground

Other information
- Station code: 408

History
- Opened: 18 January 2017

Services
Preceding station	Nanjing Metro	Following station
Jubaoshan towards Longjiang	Line 4	Jinmalu towards Xianlinhu
Location
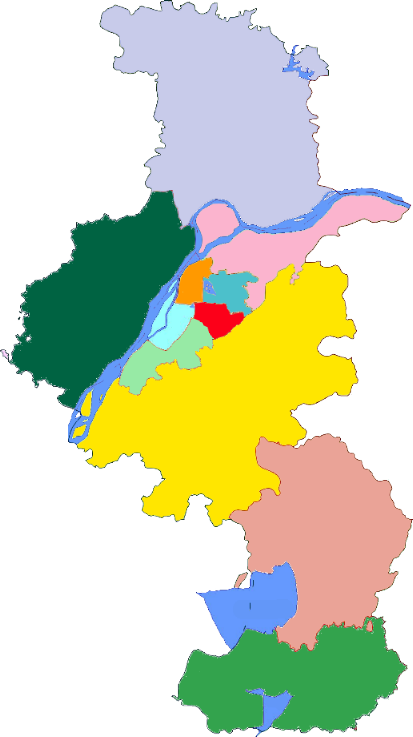
- Location within Nanjing Location within Jiangsu Location within China

Xuzhuang station.(Chinese: 徐庄站; pinyin: Xúzhuāng zhàn), formerly known as Xuzhuang / Suning HQ station (Chinese: 徐庄·苏宁总部站; pinyin: Xúzhuāng / Sūníng Zǒngbù zhàn), is a station on Line 4 of the Nanjing Metro. It opened on January 18, 2017 alongside seventeen other stations as part of Line 4's first phase. The station is oriented on an east–west axis, underneath Suning Avenue and Donglai Street. The station is named after the nearby Xuzhuang Software Park and the headquarters of Suning Commerce Group, a Nanjing-based company. A mural inside the station's mezzanine level depicts the software and technology industry of the titular software park.
