= Yunnanlu station =

Railway station in Nanjing, Jiangsu, China

Yunnanlu 云南路
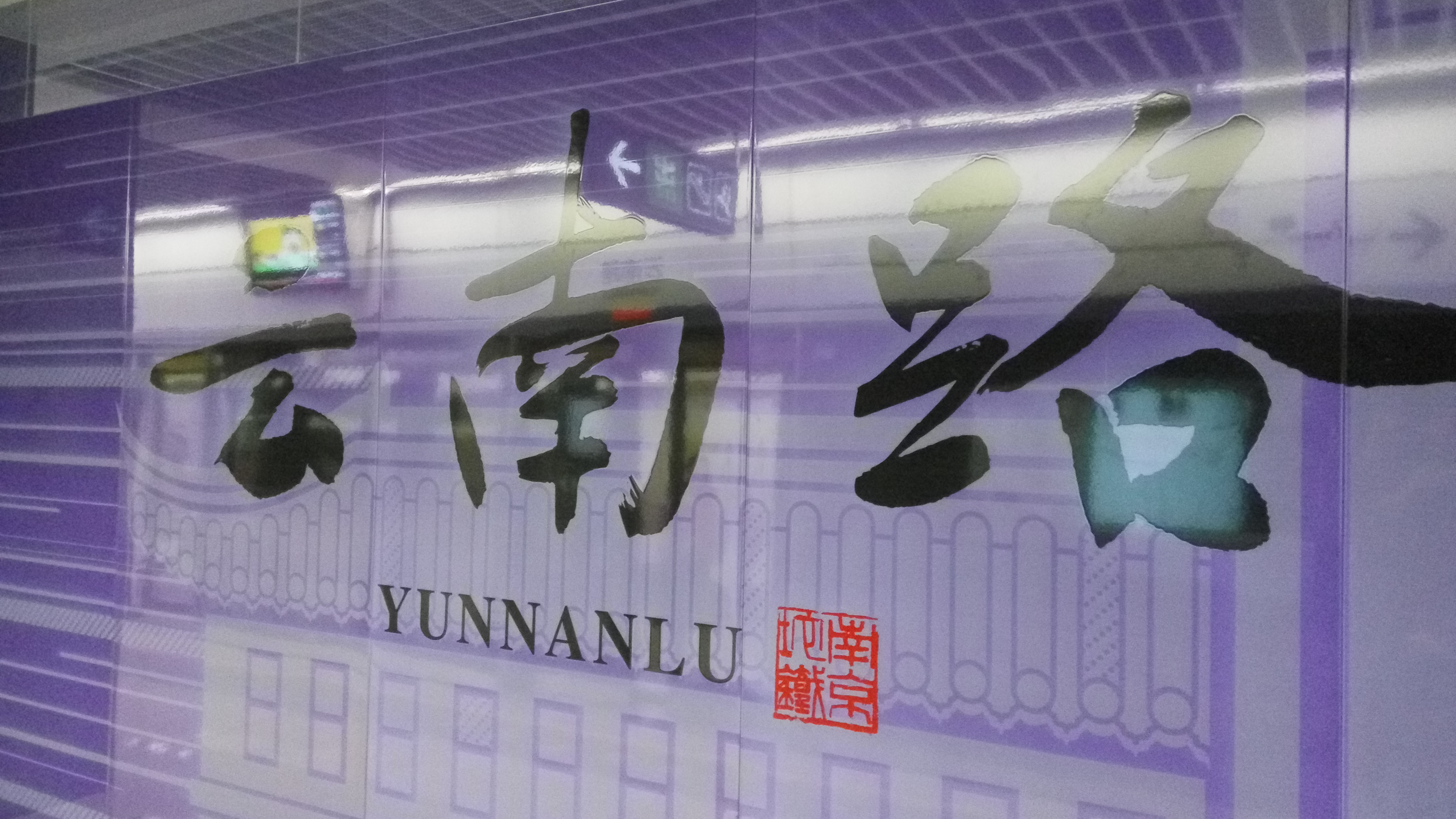
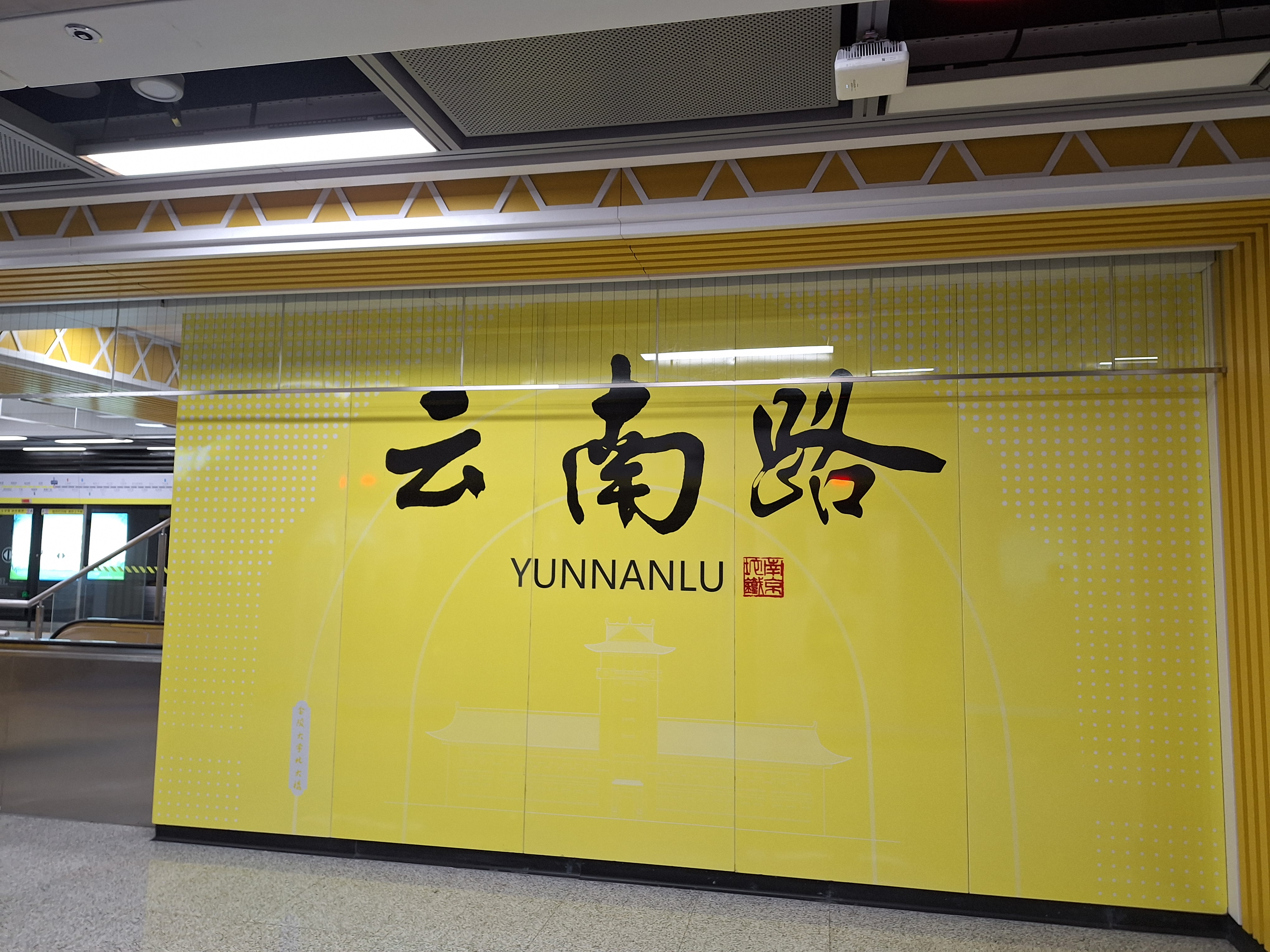
- Yunnan Road Station Line 4 Station Name Large Character Wall Yunnan Road Station Line 5 Station Name Large Character Wall (August 2025)

General information
- Location: Gulou District, Nanjing, Jiangsu; China
- Coordinates: 32.0612°N 118.76943°E
- Operated by: Nanjing Metro Co. Ltd.
- Lines: Line 4; Line 5

Construction
- Structure type: Underground

Other information
- Station code: 416

History
- Opened: 18 January 2017 (Line 4); 6 August 2025 (Line 5)

Services
Preceding station	Nanjing Metro	Following station
Caochangmen / NUA / JSSNU towards Longjiang	Line 4	Gulou towards Xianlinhu
Qingchunguangchang towards Fangjiaying	Line 5	Wutaishan towards Jiyindadao
Location

Yunnanlu station (Chinese: 云南路站) is a station on Line 4 and Line 5 of the Nanjing Metro. It opened on January 18, 2017, alongside seventeen other stations as part of Line 4's first phase. The station is oriented on an east–west axis, underneath the intersection of Beijing West Road and Yunnan Road to the north and Shanghai Road to the south.

The station has five exits and sits on the northwestern corner of Nanjing University's Gulou campus and near the headquarters for the provincial electric company and a gaokao testing center.
