= Huitonglu station =

Huitonglu station may refer to:

- Huitonglu station (Nanjing Metro), a station on Line 4 (Nanjing Metro)
- Huitonglu station (Shijiazhuang Metro), a station on Line 3 (Shijiazhuang Metro)
