= Mengbei station =

Metro station in Nanjing, China

Mengbei 孟北
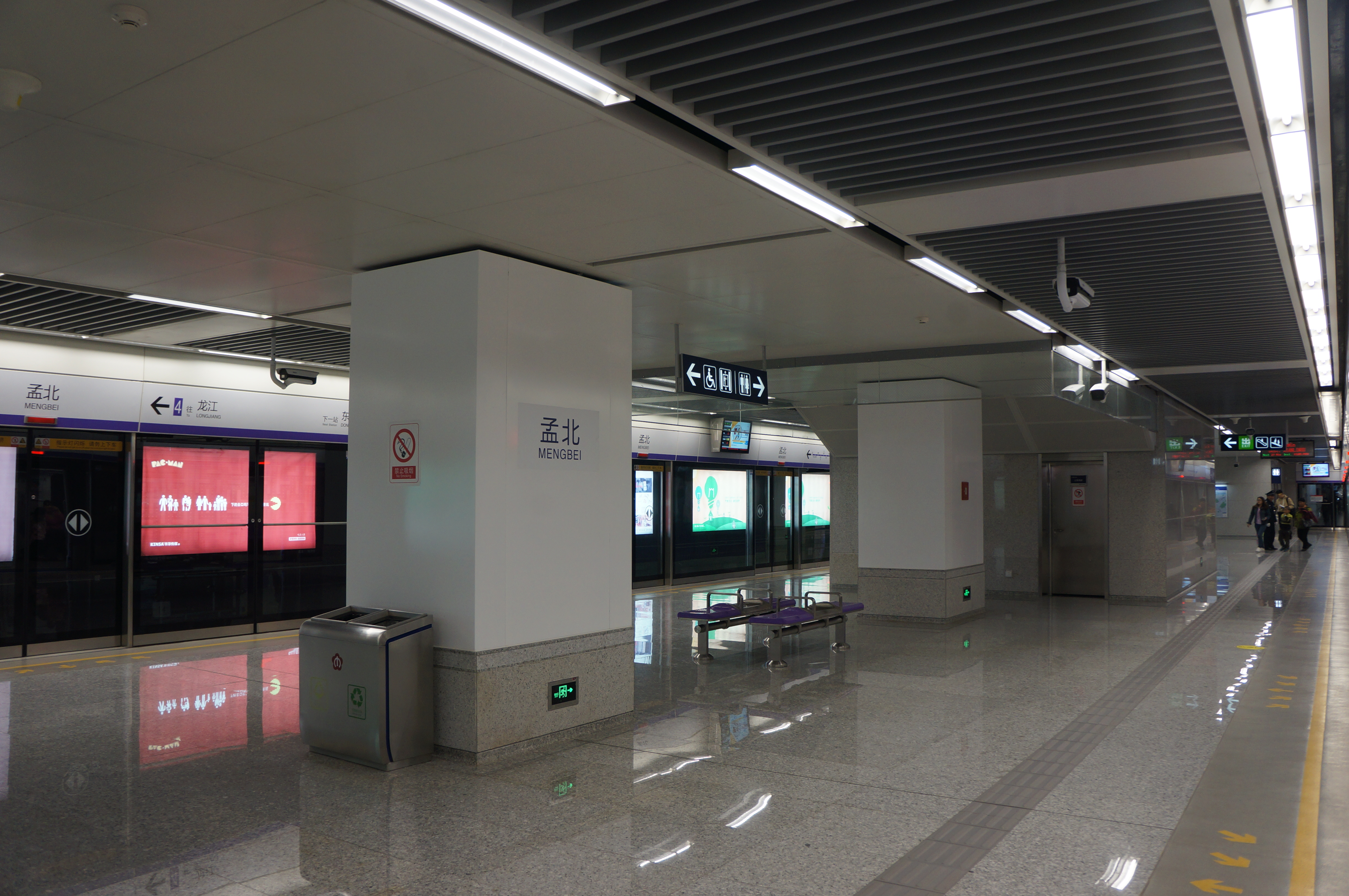

General information
- Location: Qixia District, Nanjing, Jiangsu; China
- Coordinates: 32.0866°N 118.9821°E
- Operated by: Nanjing Metro Co. Ltd.
- Line(s): Line 4

Construction
- Structure type: Underground

Other information
- Station code: 403

History
- Opened: 18 January 2017

Services
Preceding station	Nanjing Metro	Following station
Dongliu towards Longjiang	Line 4	Xiganghuashu towards Xianlinhu
Location

Mengbei station (Chinese: 孟北站) is a station of Line 4 of the Nanjing Metro. It started operations on 18 January 2017.
