= Dongliu station =

Metro station in Nanjing, China

Dongliu 东流
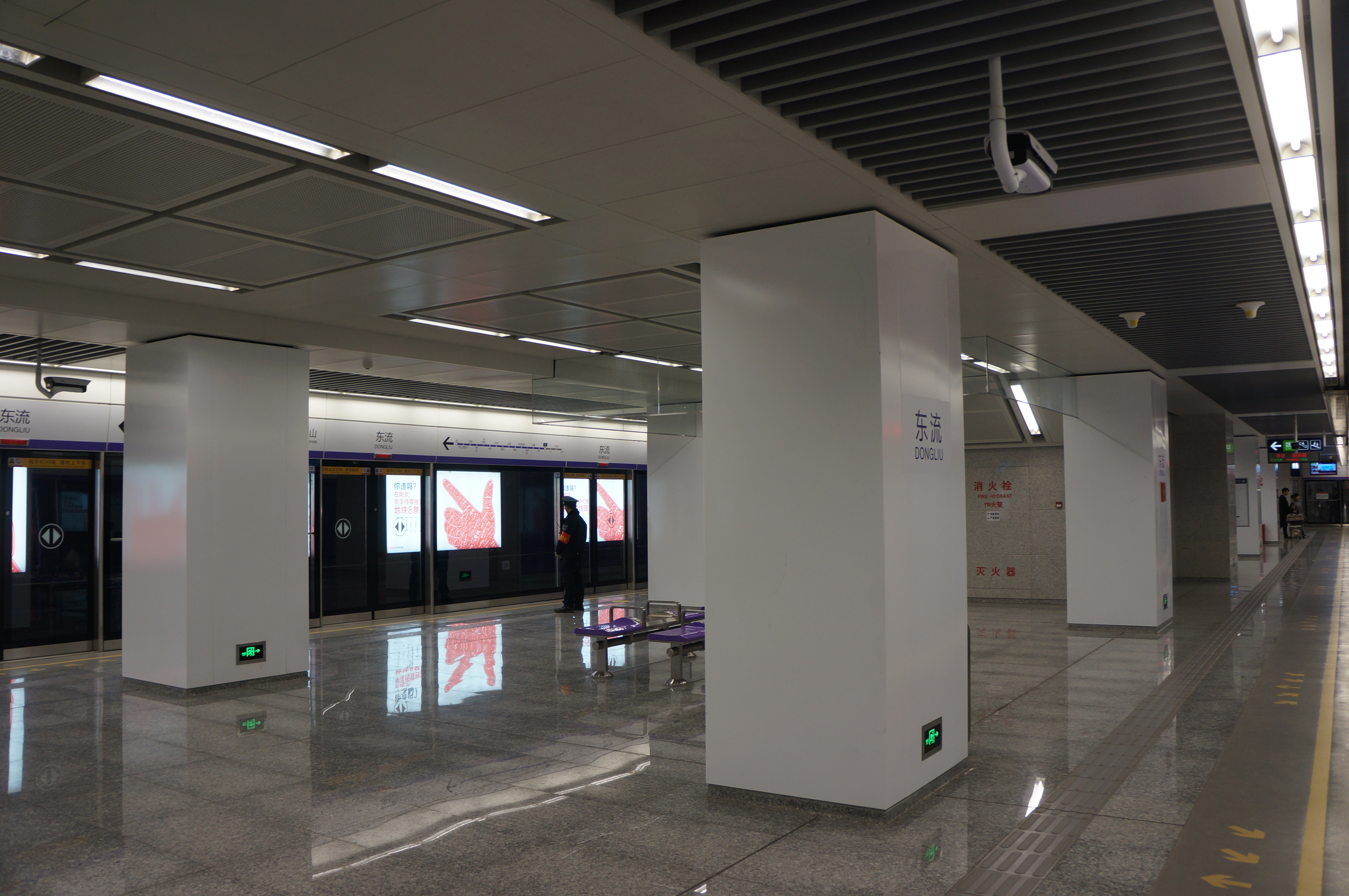

General information
- Location: Qixia District, Nanjing, Jiangsu; China
- Operated by: Nanjing Metro Co. Ltd.
- Line: Line 4

Construction
- Structure type: Underground

Other information
- Station code: 404

History
- Opened: 18 January 2017

Services
Preceding station	Nanjing Metro	Following station
Lingshan towards Longjiang	Line 4	Mengbei towards Xianlinhu
Location

Dongliu station (Chinese: 东流站) is an underground station on Line 4 of the Nanjing Metro that opened in January 2017 along with eighteen other stations as part of Line 4's first phase. It is located at Dongliu Village, Qixia District.

Exits shown in the Metro station are listed below:

Exit	Instructions (in Chinese)	Instructions (in English)
1	山南头村	Shannantou Village
2	山南头村	Shannantou Village
3	西流村	Xiliu Village
4*	东流村	Dongliu Village

* Elevator
