= Lingshan station =

Metro station in Nanjing, China

Lingshan 灵山
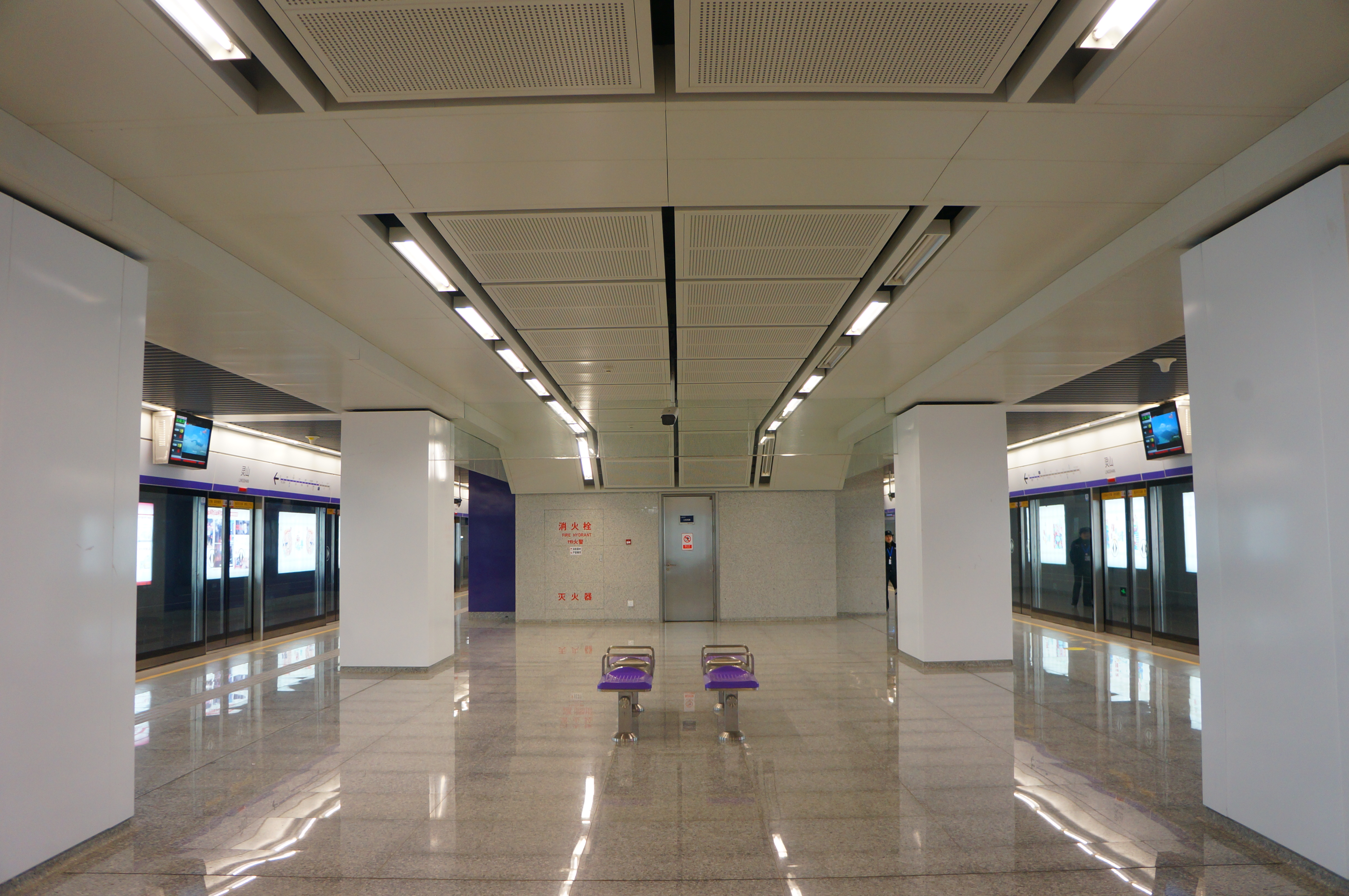

General information
- Location: Qixia District, Nanjing, Jiangsu; China
- Operated by: Nanjing Metro Co. Ltd.
- Line: Line 4

Construction
- Structure type: Underground

Other information
- Station code: 405

History
- Opened: 18 January 2017

Services
Preceding station	Nanjing Metro	Following station
Huitonglu towards Longjiang	Line 4	Dongliu towards Xianlinhu
Location

Lingshan station (Chinese: 灵山站) is an underground station on Line 4 of the Nanjing Metro that opened in January 2017 along with eighteen other stations as part of Line 4's first phase. It is located at Qilin Elevated Highway, Qixia District. The station is named after Lingshangen Village.

Exits shown in the Metro station are listed below:

Exit	Instructions (in Chinese)	Instructions (in English)
1	灵山根	Lingshangen
2	高井*	Gaojing
3	西流村 （未开通）	Xiliu Village （Exit Not Available）

* Elevator
