= Jubaoshan station =

Train station in Nanjing, Jiangsu, China

Jubaoshan 聚宝山
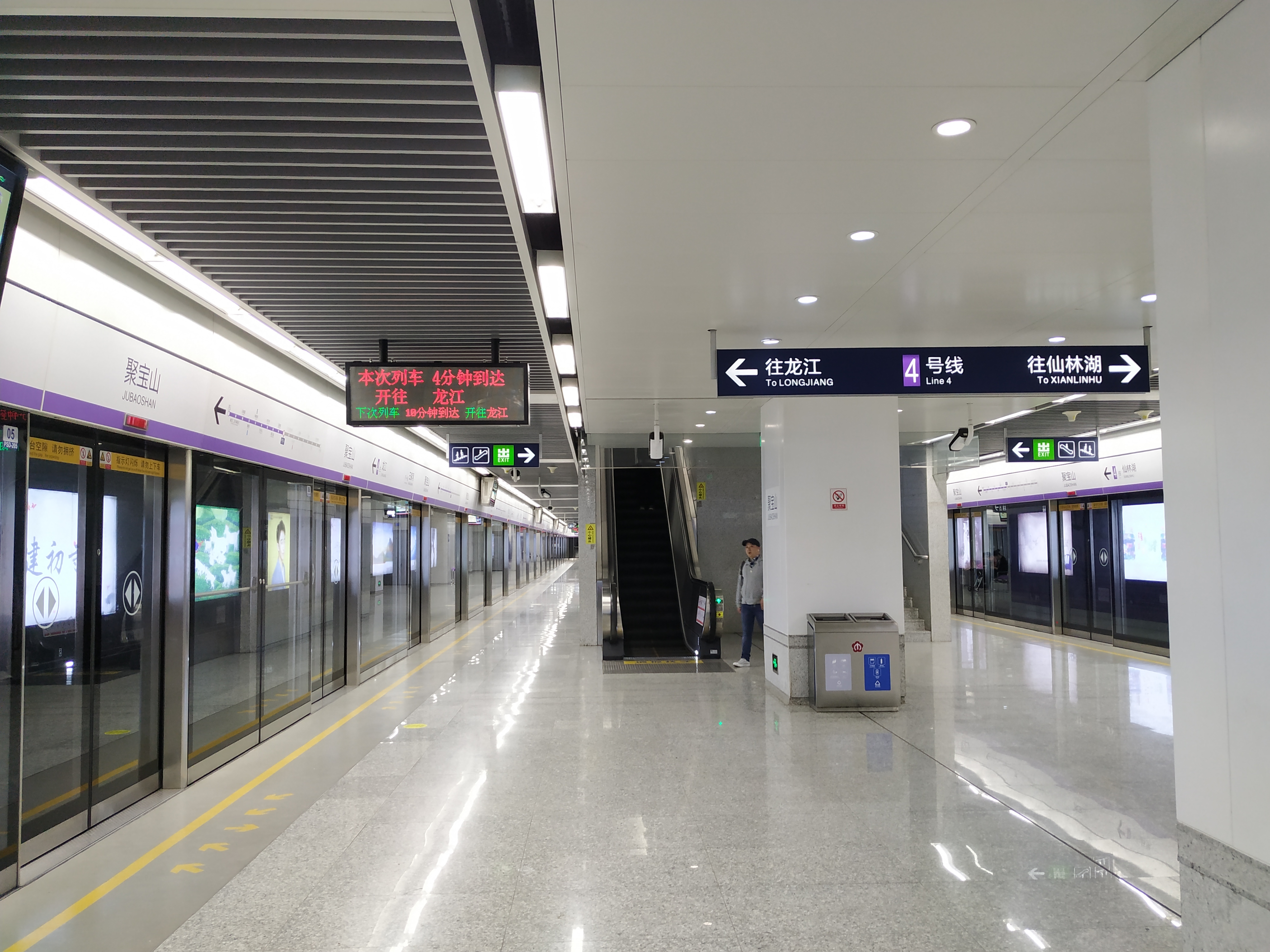

General information
- Location: Xuanwu District, Nanjing, Jiangsu; China
- Operated by: Nanjing Metro Co. Ltd.
- Line: Line 4

Construction
- Structure type: Underground

Other information
- Station code: 409

History
- Opened: 18 January 2017

Services
Preceding station	Nanjing Metro	Following station
Wangjiawan towards Longjiang	Line 4	Suning Headquarters – Xuzhuang towards Xianlinhu
Location

Jubaoshan station (Chinese: 聚宝山站) is an underground station on Line 4 of the Nanjing Metro that opened in January 2017 along with eighteen other stations as part of Line 4's first phase. It is located at Xuanwu Avenue, Xuanwu District. The station is named after Jubao Mountain.
