= Wangjiawan station =

Wangjiawan station may refer to one of the following metro stations:

- Wangjiawan station (Nanjing Metro)
- Wangjiawan station (Wuhan Metro)
