= Wangjiawan station (Nanjing Metro) =

Metro station in Nanjing, China

Wangjiawan 王家湾
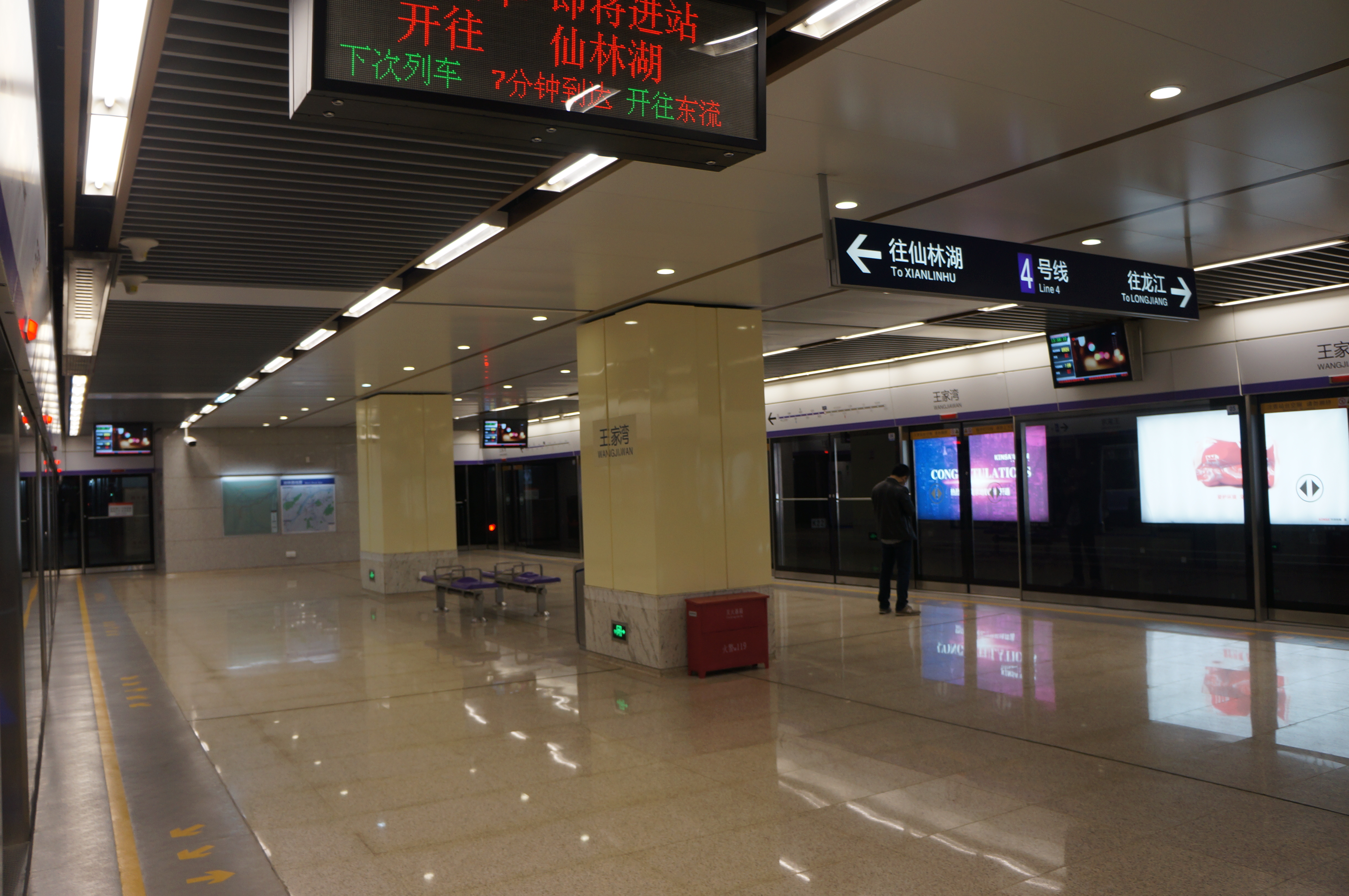

General information
- Location: Xuanwu District, Nanjing, Jiangsu; China
- Coordinates: 30.5624°N 114.2107°E
- Operated by: Nanjing Metro Co. Ltd.
- Line(s): Line 4

Construction
- Structure type: Underground

Other information
- Station code: 410

History
- Opened: 18 January 2017

Services
Preceding station	Nanjing Metro	Following station
Jiangwangmiao towards Longjiang	Line 4	Jubaoshan towards Xianlinhu
Location

Wangjiawan station (simplified Chinese: 王家湾站; traditional Chinese: 王家灣站; pinyin: Wángjiāwān Zhàn) is a station on Line 4 of the Nanjing Metro that opened in January 2017 along with eighteen other stations as part of Line 4's first phase. The station is located underneath the T-intersection of Jiangwangmiao Avenue and Dongfang Road on an east–west axis and is within walking distance of Purple Mountain. Originally named Jiangwangmiao Station during Line 4's planning phase, that name was later transferred to the immediately preceding station to the west.
