= Gulou station (Nanjing Metro) =

Nanjing Metro interchange station

Coordinates: 32°03′33″N 118°47′02″E

Gulou 鼓楼
- Platform of Line 1

General information
- Location: Gulou District, Nanjing, Jiangsu; China
- Lines: Line 1; Line 4

Other information
- Station code: 122 (Line 1); 415 (Line 4)

History
- Opened: 3 September 2005 (Line 1); 18 January 2017 (Line 4)

Services
Preceding station	Nanjing Metro	Following station
Xuanwumen towards Baguazhoudaqiaonan	Line 1	Zhujianglu towards CPU
Yunnanlu towards Longjiang	Line 4	Jimingsi towards Xianlinhu
Location

Gulou station (simplified Chinese: 鼓楼站; traditional Chinese: 鼓樓站; pinyin: Gǔlóu Zhàn; lit. 'drum tower station') is an interchange station on Line 1 and Line 4 of the Nanjing Metro. Opened on 3 September 2005 for the Line 1 portion of the station, Gulou station is among the first Nanjing Metro stations to open for passenger service. It is named for an old drum tower that serves as a local landmark nearby. The line 4 section of the station opened on 18 January 2017, with cultural exhibits lining the station's walls. Located underneath a roundabout that links to Beijing West Road, Beijing East Road, Zhongyang Road, Zhongshan Road and Zhongshan North Road, Gulou station is located near Gulou Hospital, Nanjing University's Gulou campus, and is right underneath the Zifeng Tower.
