= Gulin Park =

Park in Jiangsu province, China

Gulin Park Chinese: (古林公园)
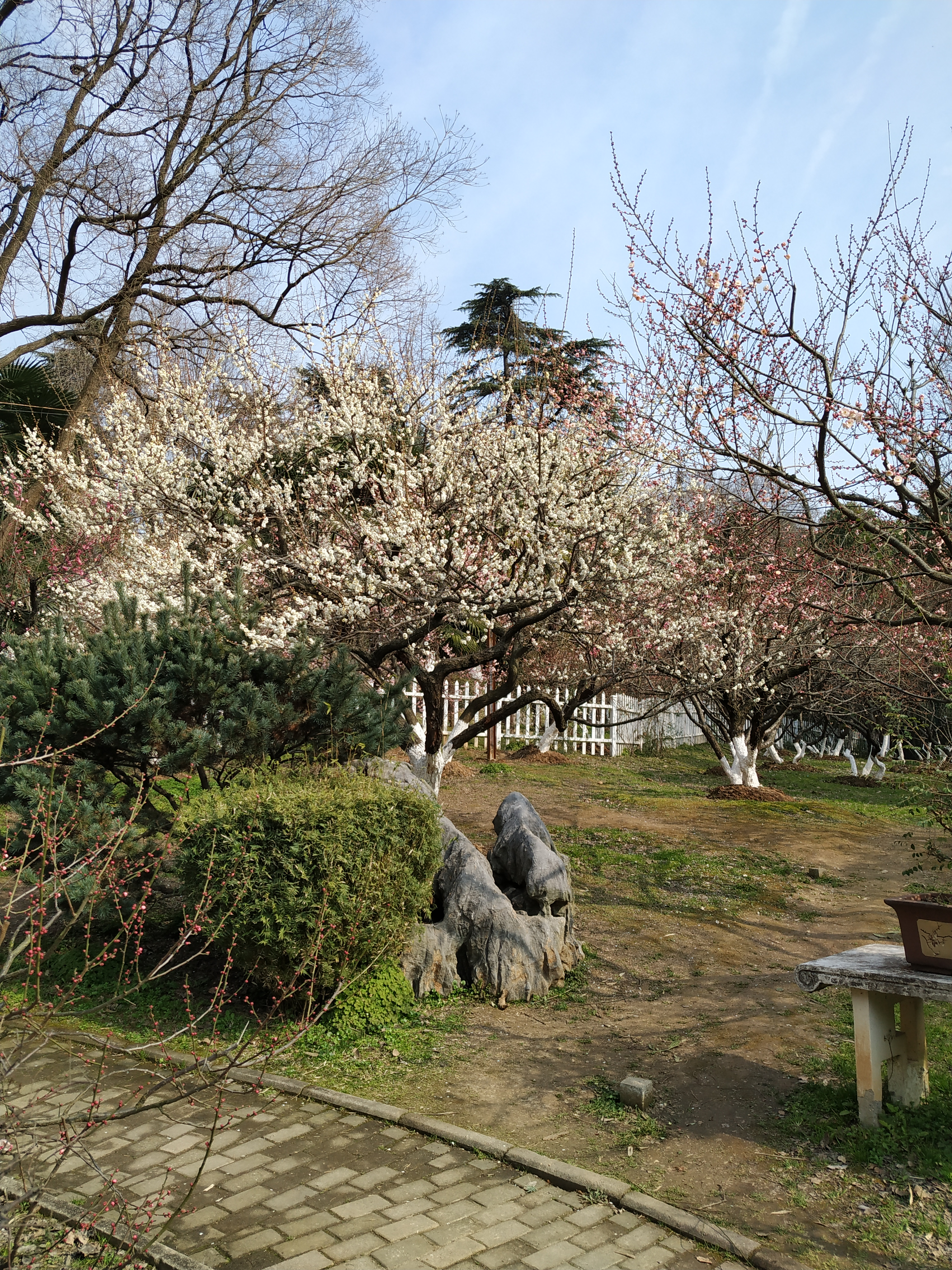
- Interactive map of Gulin Park; Chinese: (古林公园)
- Location: Huju Road North, Nanjing, China
- Coordinates: 32°4′5.33″N 118°44′53.16″E

Gulin Park (Chinese: 古林公园) is a 400-acre park in Nanjing in Jiangsu province, China.

== Description ==
Gulin Park is located on the west side of Huju Road North near the Nanjing Arts Institute (南京艺术学院). Within the park are temples, ancient structures, and Eight Centre Court (八景阁), the highest point in the park. The park has an outdoor swimming pool that is open during the summer. There are picnic areas where visitors can barbecue food. Every spring, Gulin Park holds a "plum exhibition" with more than 3000 plum species. Gulin Park has a ten yuan admission charge per person, which is expected to be eliminated in 2015.
