= Jiangsu Second Normal University =

University in Nanjing, China

Coordinates: 32.0609°N 118.7486°E

The Jiangsu Second Normal University
- 江苏第二师范学院
- Former name: 江苏教育学院
- Motto in English: advocating ethics, dedicating to work, seeking truth and blazing new trails
- Type: Public
- Established: 1952
- Affiliations: The Jiangsu Institute of Educational Science 江苏省教育科学研究院
- Chancellor: Professor 丁晓昌 Xiaochang Ding
- Vice-Chancellor: Professor 周成平 hengping Zhou
- Administrative staff: 400
- Students: 6,000
- Location: Nanjing, Jiangsu, China
- Campus: Caochangmen, Pukou and Xiaohang
- Nickname: JSIE
- Website: http:// zs.jsie.edu.cn

The Jiangsu Second Normal University (Chinese: 江苏第二师范学院) (formerly named as Jiangsu Institute of Education) is located in the city of Nanjing, Jiangsu province, China. It was established as a modern university in 1952, and is the only one dedicated to both teacher education and educational science research in Jiangsu province. It has many national and provincial education research programs, to guide the province's education and scientific research work for the educational administrative departments at all levels of government and provide the basis for scientific decision-making.

The Jiangsu Institute of Educational Science and Jiangsu Second Normal University are located beside the ancient Rock Wall in the west of the city of Nanjing.

The Jiangsu Second Normal University has three campuses: Caochangmen campus (Chinese: 草场门), located in the centre of Nanjing City, Pukou campus, located in north of Nanjing, which is the home to fresh undergraduate students, and Xiaohang campus.

== History ==
Established in 1952, the Jiangsu Second Normal University is one of the most famous institutions dedicated to professional teacher education in Jiangsu. JSIE provides undergraduate diploma and degrees, some postgraduate diploma, certificates and a range of in-service programs to pre-service students and serving teachers. In October 2006, the institute built its new campus in Pukou near Nanjing University Pukou campus. In 2009, some departments moved to Xiaohang campus.

The institute is committed to the training of the administrative personnel and teachers from key provincial middle schools, average senior middle schools, normal schools, county teacher training schools, and municipal and country or district education bureaus. Additionally, it has undertaken the UNESCO/UNDP/ 420 and 401 Projects to train primary and secondary school principals from the remote and minority areas of the country. In 1993, it was established as the institution in charge of the examinations for independent study teachers of primary and secondary schools, as well as kindergarten. In 2000 the Chinese Ministry of Education designated it as the base training site for mainstay principals and backbone teachers at the state level. The institute promotes the school spirit of 'advocating ethics, dedicating to work, seeking truth and blazing new trails'. In November 2001, the institute was evaluated and designated a high-quality institute by the Provincial Department of Education.

== Recent developments ==
According to the Official Letter of Agreement of the Establishment of Jiangsu Second Normal University Based on Jiangsu Institute of Education (No. 51 by Ministry of Education in 2013) and the Announcement of the Establishment of Jiangsu Second Normal University(No. 64 by Jiangsu Province People's Government in 2013), Jiangsu Institute of Education was officially named as Jiangsu Second Normal University May 20, 2013.

In 2002, the institute won a funding from the Jiangsu Government to establish The Jiangsu Institute of Educational Science (Abbreviated: JSIES, Chinese: 江苏省教育科学研究院) in its caochangmen campus. It has a national and provincial education research, to guide the province's education and scientific research work for the educational administrative departments at all levels of government and provide the basis for scientific decision-making.

In 2006, the Nanjing Normal University-Jiangsu Institute of Education joint training 4-years undergraduate program was permitted by the Ministry of Education of PRC.Some 2010 graduates, the first session of the joint training program, had received their undergraduate diplomas and bachelor's degrees from Nanjing Normal University, and got their The Teacher Certification from Jiangsu Second Normal University.

The institute seeks to enhance its research capacity. Eleven institute-level research centres had been set up to facilitate the growth of expertise in multi-disciplinary research. They include:

- Teaching Research centre
- Office of Planning Educational Science of Jiangsu Province
- Institute for Higher Education
- Education Development Center
- Primary and secondary curriculum materials research center
- Institute of Early Childhood Education
- Institute of Special Education
- Institute of Basic Education
- Institute of Vocational Education
- Institute of lifelong education
- Institute of Modern Educational Technology

== Departments ==
The institute has 17 departments covered B.S., B.A. and B.E. degree courses. They include:

- Department of Physics
  - General Physics Lab
  - Radio Physics Laboratory
  - Modern Physics Laboratory
  - Computer Laboratory
  - Electronic and Electrical Laboratory
  - EDA Lab
- Department of Chemistry
- Department of Physics
- Department of Foreign Languages
- Department of Chemistry
- Department of Computer Science & Technology
- Department of Biology
- Department of Chinese
- Department of History
- Department of Music
- Fine Arts Department
- Department of Mathematics
- Department of Geography
- Department of Modern Media and Educational Technology
- Department of Educational Technology & Education Management
- Department of Political Science
- Department of Economics
- Department of Sports

== Provincial Teacher training center ==
- Provincial Teacher training center
- Provincial Center for educational administration training
- provincial Center for Qualification of teachers
- Provincial Center for Monitoring Educational Quality

== International Corporation ==
The institute is very active in developing international exchange and cooperation. Working in collaboration with UNESCO, UNDP and the World Bank, it successfully implemented UNDP/CPR/420 and 401 Projects and the teacher training project for population education. A large number of teachers and managerial cadres have been dispatched to America, Britain, Germany, Australia, Canada, Sweden, Denmark, Japan, Singapore and Thailand for study, investigation or academic exchanges. Meanwhile, a host of foreign experts and scholars have been invited to give lectures or teach for extended periods at the institute. Friendly cooperative relations have been established between the institute and the universities in the above-mentioned countries, as well as Hong Kong and Taiwan.

== Campus ==
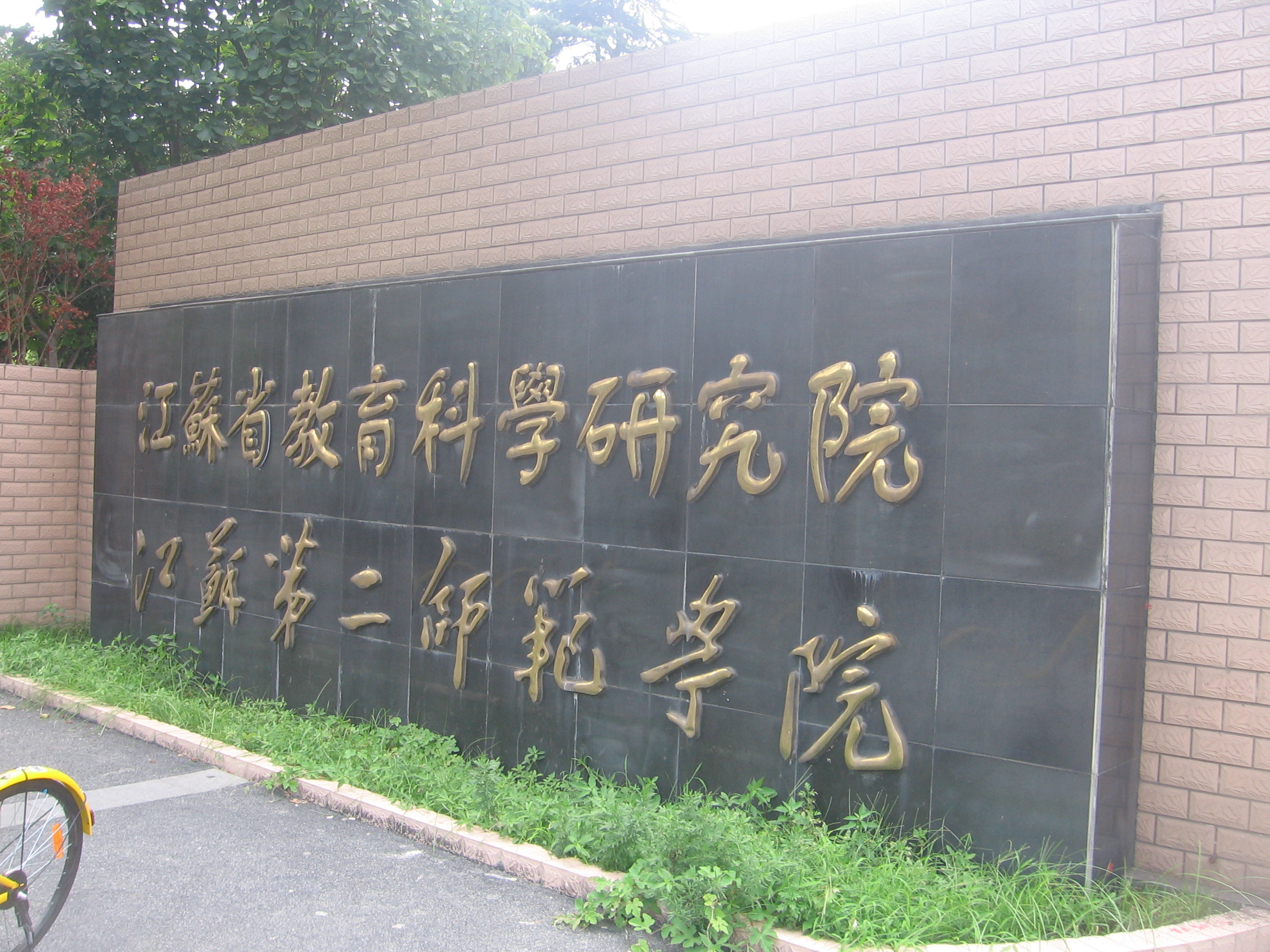
Caochangmen Campus

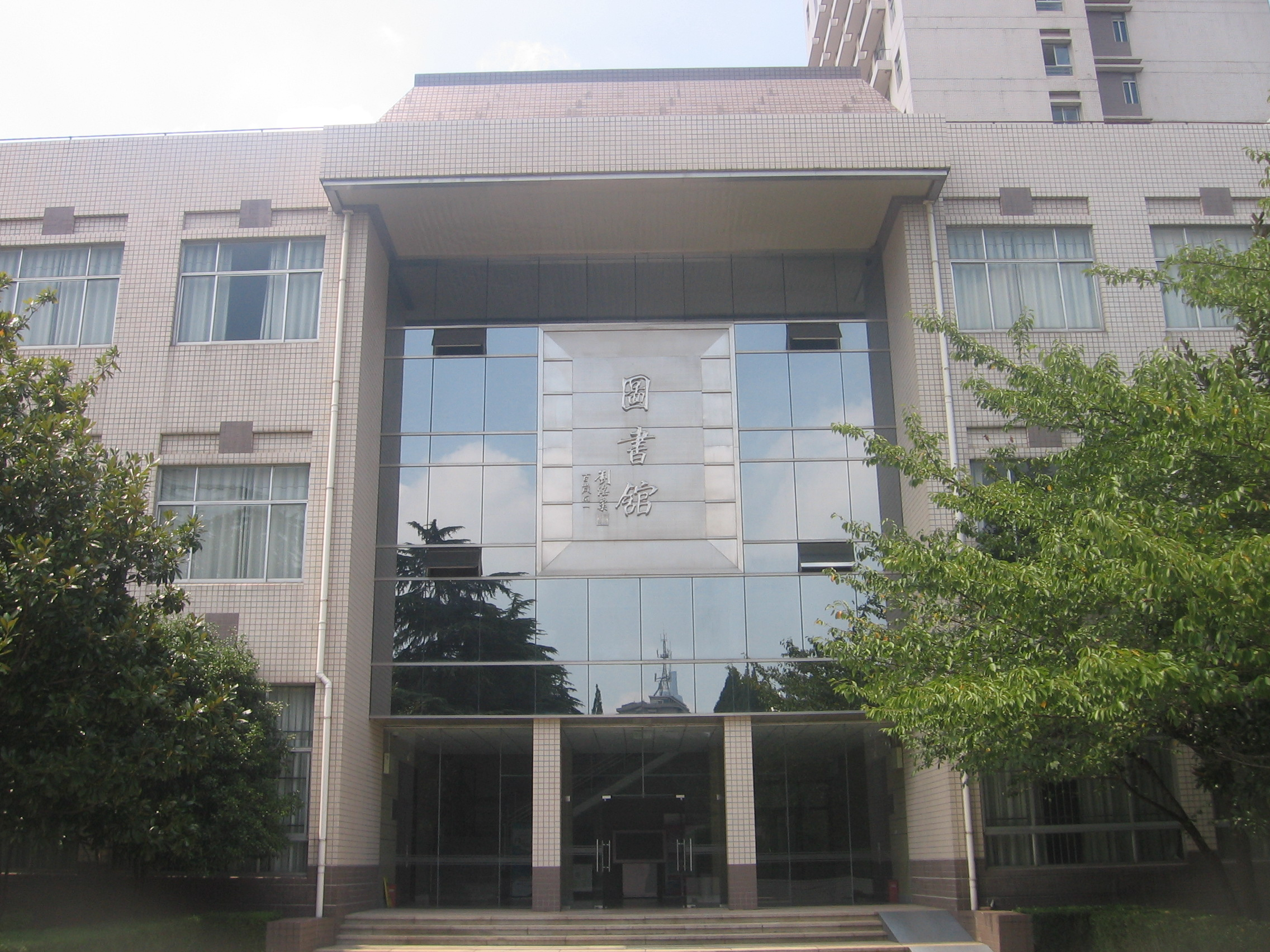
Library in Caochangmen Campus

The Jiangsu Second Normal University has three campuses: Caochangmen campus, located in the centre of Nanjing City, Pukou campus, located in north of Nanjing, and Xiaohang campus. The distance between Caochangmen and Pukou campus is about 18 kilometres.

Caochangmen campus is located in Gulou District, eastern to Qinhuai river of Nanjing City. It occupies an area of 400 mu (32ha). This campus is served by NUA/JSSNU/Caochangmen Station, a station on Line 4, Nanjing Metro.

Pukou Campus is situated in the suburban Pukou District and became part of Jiangsu Second Normal University in 2006. The campus is the home to undergraduate students. Pukou Campus hosts undergraduate freshmen, sophomore and some junior students.

Xiaohang Campus is located in southwest of Nanjing, northern to Olympic sports center of Nanjing. It was opened in 2009. There is the stop of Xiaohang Station on the Line 10 of Nanjing Metro, which enables Xiaohang and Caochangmen campus be connected through subway.

== See also ==
- Education in Nanjing
