= Jing'an Station =

Jing'an station may refer to:

- Jingan metro station, in New Taipei, Taiwan served by Taipei Metro.
- Jing'an station (Nanjing Metro), on the planned Line S5 (Nanjing Metro) in Jiangsu province, China.
