= Feng Jialiang =

Chinese painter (born 1966)

- 封加梁
- Born: March 9, 1966 (age 60); Wuxi, Jiangsu
- Known for: oil painting

Feng Jialiang (Chinese: 封加梁; b. 1966) is a painter from Wuxi, Jiangsu province, China, specializing in oil painting.

He studied oil painting in the School of Fine Arts in Nanjing University of the Arts and was awarded a bachelor's degree in 1991. He was awarded a master's degree in oil painting by Nanjing Normal University and began his teaching career there in 1997. He further studied techniques and materials in École nationale supérieure des Beaux-Arts de Paris in 1998, and went on a study tour in the US from 1999–2002 and an academic exchange to Russia in 2002. He was awarded a doctor of arts in 2009.

Currently residing in Nanjing, Feng is a professor and graduate supervisor in the School of Fine Arts in Nanjing Normal University and Deputy Secretary General of Jiangsu Oil Painting Association.

== Exhibitions ==
- 1989, The Girl, Seventh National Art Exhibition
- 1990, Still Life, Exhibition of Oil Painting, Nanjing
- 1991, Portrait of A Female College Student, Second prize of Jiangsu Oil Painting Exhibition, collected by Wuxi Gallery
- 1992, The Girl, 1992 China Exhibition of Oil Paintings
- 1996, The Green Background, Jiangsu Exhibition of Oil Painted Portraits
- 1998, The Wall of Mountains, First Jiangsu Art Festival
- 1999, The Stone Tablet, Jiangsu Exhibition of Oil Paintings
- 1999, Self-Portrait, One Hundred Years, One Hundred People, One Hundred Family Names
- 1999, The Series of Buddha, Personal Exhibition in the US
- 2000, The Series of Portraits, Personal Exhibition in the US
- 2003, The Series of Buddha, Personal Exhibition in Nanjing Gallery
- 2011, Dusk and Night, The Overlapping World – Exhibition of Contemporary Art in Nanjing Gu’an Art Center
- 2011, The Series of Human Bodies, Asking the Way – Exhibition of Contemporary Art, Xijinhui Gallery of Contemporary Art, Jiangsu
- 2011, The Portrait, Discovering the Noumenon – Exhibition of Jiangsu Young and Middle-aged Oil Painters, Guangdong Lingnan Gallery
- 2011, Dusk, National Exhibition of Art Teachers, Guangdong Gallery
- 2011, Night and Restraint, Wuxi Centenary Exhibition of Oil Paintings, Wuxi Sujia Gallery
- 2012, Descent, awarded work of excellence in the Eighth Jiangsu Oil Painting Exhibition, Jiangsu Gallery
- 2012, Personal Exhibition of Feng Jialiang, Beijing 798 Art Zone
- 2012, Inside and Outside the Frame – Width 5, Exhibition of Contemporary Arts
- 2012, Depiction of Jiangsu - Exhibition of One Hundred Painters, Nanjing University of the Arts
- 2012, Broad, Concise, Profound, Aesthetic – Exhibition of 100th Anniversary of NUA
- 2012, Traitor to Art, Nanjing Shangdong Contemporary Gallery
- 2012, Fatigue and Extension – Departure from Nanjing, Nanjing Sanchuan Contemporary Gallery
- 2013, Exhibition of Contemporary Asian Arts, Hong Kong
- 2013, Grace of the Age – Art Exhibition of Jiangsu Universities, Gallery of NUA
- 2013, Detached from Material Life – Exhibition of Jiangsu Contemporary Arts, Zhejiang Gallery
- 2013, Exhibition in Fangshan Art Camp, Nanjing
- 2014, Nanjing International Art Exhibition, Nanjing International Expo Center

== Publications ==
- 1996, Romance of Rivers and Lakes: Fachang’s Paintings, Chinese Painters
- 2004, Reconstruction of Art Education System, Art and Design
- 2005, Unfulfilled Dreams of Space: Modigliani and His Caryatids, Exploration of Art
- 2005, The Creation and Evolution of Giorgione’s Sleeping Females, Artists
- 2006, Oil Painting – Textbook for University Art Students
- 2010, The Cause to Xu Beihong’s Realism, New Art
- 2011, The New Order of Chinese Painting and Calligraphy in Home Decoration, Chinese Decoration
- 2011, The Visual Order of National Fancy: Analysis of the Visual Logic of Spanish Superealistic Oil Paintings in 20th Century, Art and Design
- 2011, Study on Xu Beihong’s Theory of Art Education

== Collections ==
Feng’s works are mostly collected by collectors from the US, Germany, South Korea, Hong Kong and Mainland China.
