= Xiganghuashu station =

Metro station in Nanjing, China

Xiganghuashu 西岗桦墅
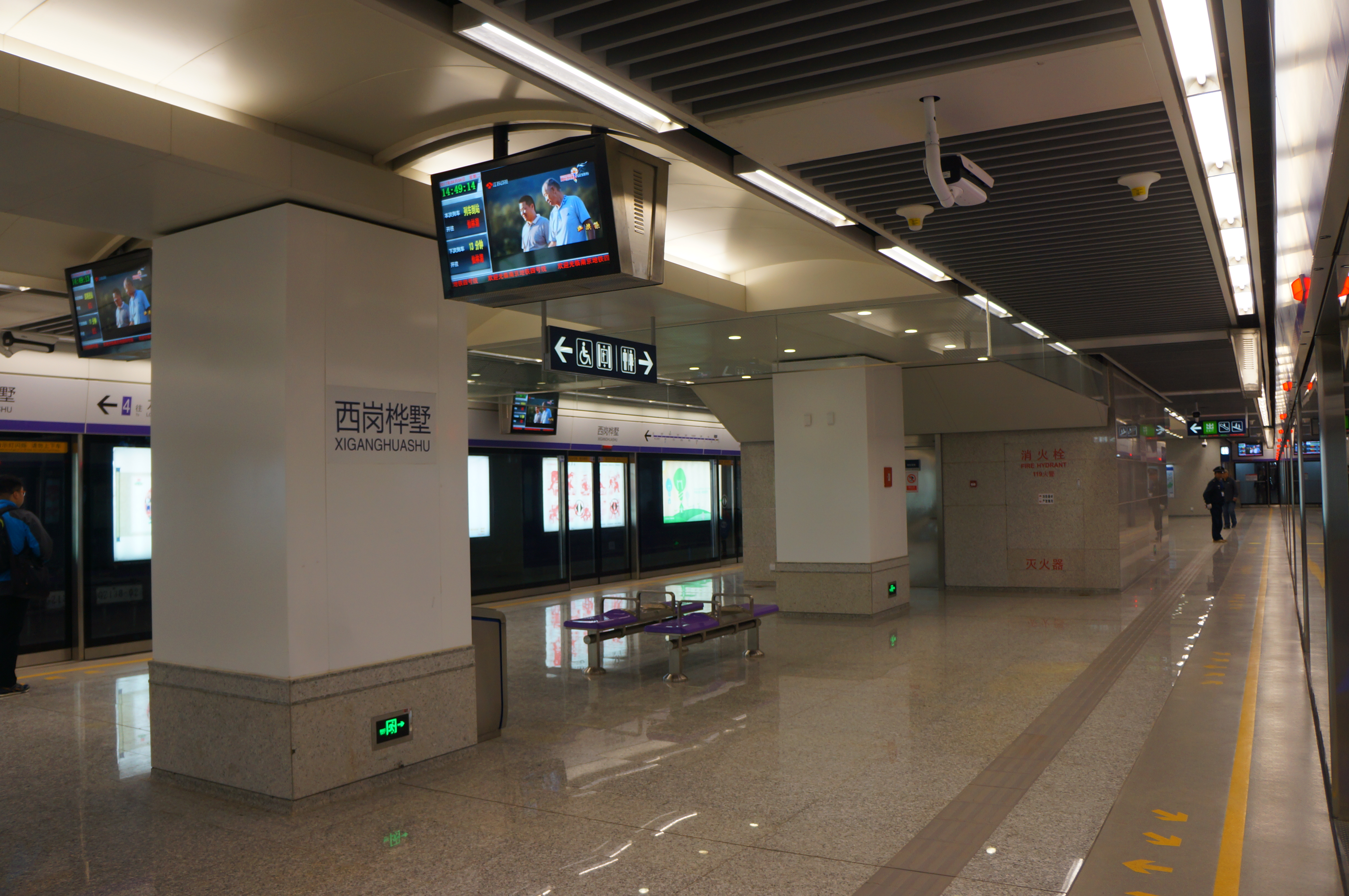

General information
- Location: Qixia District, Nanjing, Jiangsu; China
- Coordinates: 32.10107°N 118.99125°E
- Operated by: Nanjing Metro Co. Ltd.
- Line(s): Line 4

Other information
- Station code: 402

History
- Opened: 18 January 2017

Services
Preceding station	Nanjing Metro	Following station
Mengbei towards Longjiang	Line 4	Xianlinhu Terminus
Location

Xiganghuashu station (Chinese: 西岗桦墅站) is a station of Line 4 of the Nanjing Metro. It started operations on 18 January 2017.
