= Caochangmen station =

Metro station in Nanjing, China

Coordinates: 32°03′44″N 118°45′01″E

Caochangmen 草场门
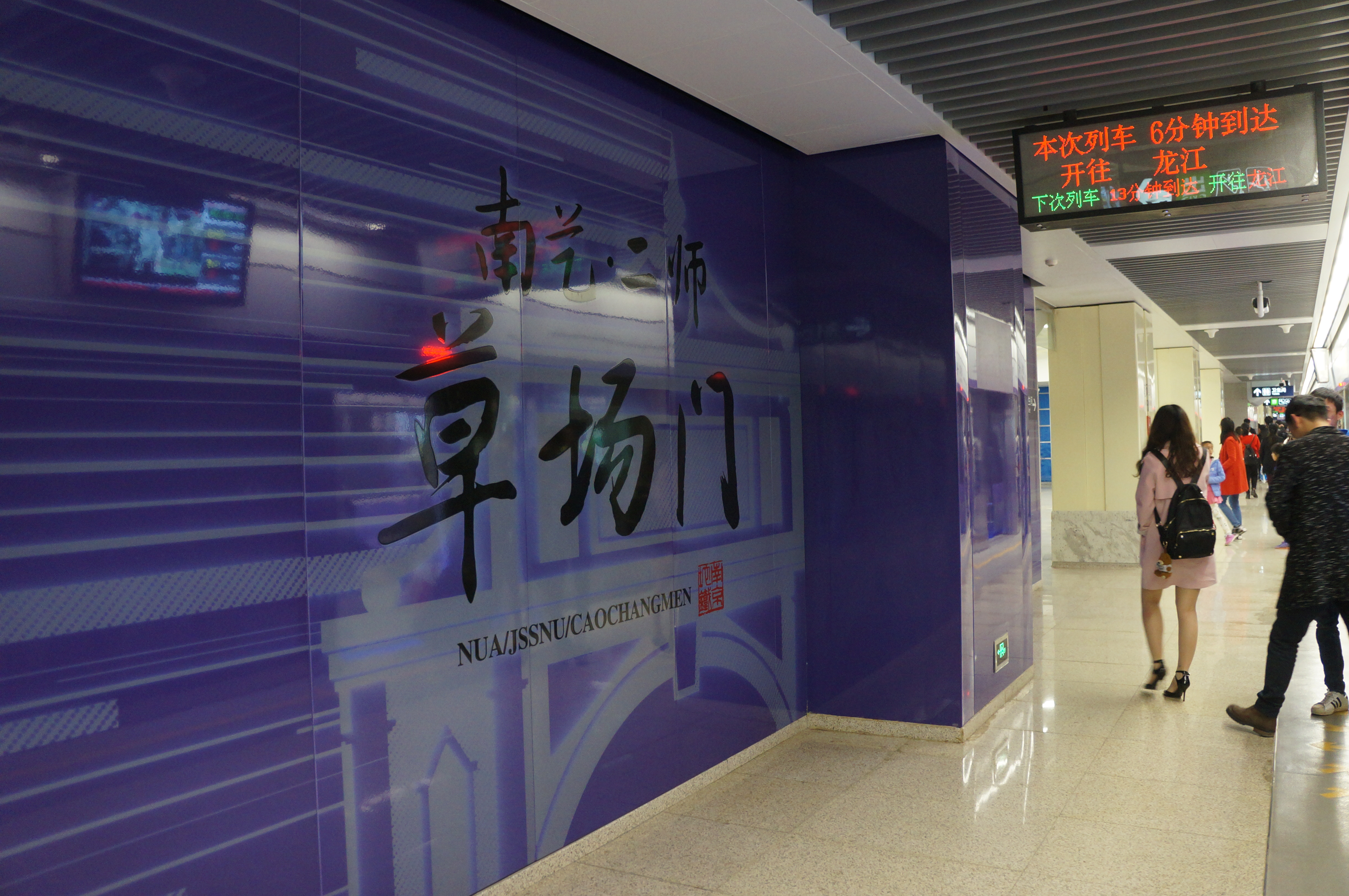
- Running-in board in April 2017

General information
- Location: Gulou District, Nanjing, Jiangsu; China
- Operated by: Nanjing Metro Co. Ltd.
- Lines: Line 4; Line 7

Construction
- Structure type: Underground

Other information
- Station code: 417 (Line 4); 714 (Line 7)

History
- Opened: 18 January 2017 (Line 4); 28 December 2024 (Line 7)

Services
Preceding station	Nanjing Metro	Following station
Longjiang Terminus	Line 4	Yunnanlu towards Xianlinhu
Gupinggang towards Xianxinlu	Line 7	Qingliangshan towards Xishanqiao
Location

Caochangmen station (Chinese: 草场门站), formerly known as Caochangmen/NUA/JSSNU station, is a station on Line 4 of the Nanjing Metro, and a interchange station with the Line 7. It opened on January 18, 2017 alongside seventeen other stations as part of Line 4's first phase. The station is oriented on an east–west axis, underneath Beijing West Road and the Caochangmen bypass tunnel. The station is named after the tunnel and two nearby universities: the Nanjing University of the Arts and the Jiangsu Second Normal University. Caochangmen Station has the longest name of any station on the Nanjing Metro network.

== Station layout ==
G	Street Level	Exit/Entrances
B1	Concourse	Faregates, ticket machines, station agent
B2; Platform	Northbound	← Line 7 towards Xianxinlu (Gupinggang)
B2; Platform	Island platform, doors will open on the left
B2; Platform	Southbound	Line 7 towards Xishanqiao (Qingliangshan) →
B3; Platform	Westbound	← Line 4 towards Longjiang (Terminus)
B3; Platform	Island platform, doors will open on the left
B3; Platform	Eastbound	Line 4 towards Xianlinhu (Yunnanlu) →

The station is entirely underground and is split across three levels. Immediately below ground level is the station concourse with ticket machines, station agent, and the faregates. The level below has a single island platform for trains on Line 7. The lowest level has a single island platform for trains on Line 4.
