= Huitonglu station (Nanjing Metro) =

Metro station in Nanjing, China

Huitonglu 汇通路
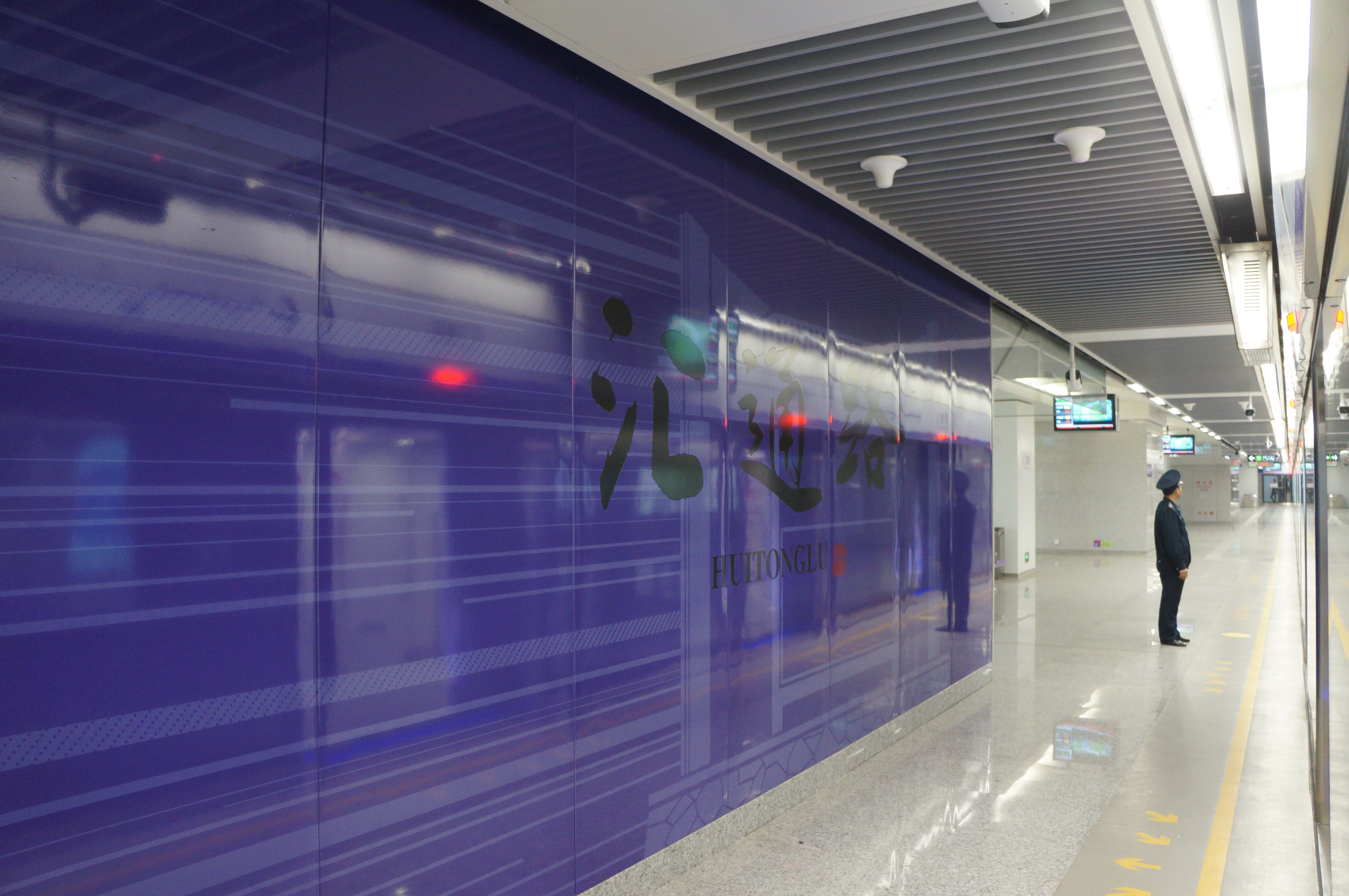

General information
- Location: Jiangning District, Nanjing, Jiangsu; China
- Operated by: Nanjing Metro Co. Ltd.
- Line: Line 4

Other information
- Station code: 406

History
- Opened: 18 January 2017

Services
Preceding station	Nanjing Metro	Following station
Jinmalu towards Longjiang	Line 4	Lingshan towards Xianlinhu
Location

Huitonglu station (Chinese: 汇通路站) is a station of Line 4 of the Nanjing Metro. It started operations on 18 January 2017.
