= Line S5 (Nanjing Metro) =

Planned metro line in Nanjing, China

- S5

Overview
- Other names: Nanjing–Yangzhou intercity railway; Nanjing–Yizheng–Yangzhou intercity railway; Ningyang Line; Nanjing-Yangzhou Line; Ningyang Intercity railway; Nanjing-Yizheng Line; Nanjing-Yizheng Intercity railway; Ningyi Intercity railway; Ningyiyang Intercity railway; Ningzhenyang Intercity railway; Yangzhou Metro Line 6 (Yangzhou section)
- Status: Under construction
- Locale: Nanjing and Yangzhou, Jiangsu Province
- Termini: Xianlinhu; Yangzhou West Railway Station
- Stations: 16

Service
- Type: Rapid Transit
- System: Nanjing Metro
- Operator: Nanjing Metro
- Rolling stock: 4-car Type A

Technical
- Line length: 57.61 km (35.8 mi)
- Character: Elevated and underground
- Track gauge: 1,435 mm (4 ft 8 1/2 in)

Line S5 is a planned rapid transit line connecting Nanjing and Yangzhou. It will be 57.61 kilometres (35.80 mi) long and have a maximum operating speed of 160 kilometres per hour (99 mph). Initially 4 car Type A trains will be used but the line is designed for expansion to 6 car trains in the future. The line will have passing loops at select stations allowing for express and local services to be offered. Local services are expected to take 45 minutes to run end to end and express services will shorten end to end travel times to 34 minutes. Construction started on December 28, 2021. The line is planned to open in 2026.

== Stations ==
Station name		Connections	Distance km	Location	
English	Chinese	Connections	Distance km	Location	
Xianlinhu	仙林湖	4 2		Qixia, Nanjing	
Sheshan	摄山	6		Qixia, Nanjing	
Jiangcheng	江乘			Qixia, Nanjing	
Longtan	龙潭			Qixia, Nanjing	
Longtanxincheng	龙潭新城			Qixia, Nanjing	
Huayuanyingfang	花园营防			Qixia, Nanjing	
Jing'an	靖安	Ningzhen ICR		Qixia, Nanjing	
Huangtiandang	黄天荡			Qixia, Nanjing	
Wannianlu	万年路			Yizheng	Yangzhou
Gongnonglu	工农路			Yizheng	Yangzhou
Tianningdadao	天宁大道			Yizheng	Yangzhou
Yizhengkaifaqu	仪征开发区			Yizheng	Yangzhou
Puxi	朴席			Yizheng	Yangzhou
Chahe	汊河			Hanjiang	Yangzhou
Zhannanlu	站南路			Hanjiang	Yangzhou
Yangzhou West Railway Station	扬州西站	YLH		Hanjiang	Yangzhou
