= White Horse Park =

Park in Nanjing, China

Coordinates: 32°03′38″N 118°49′01″E

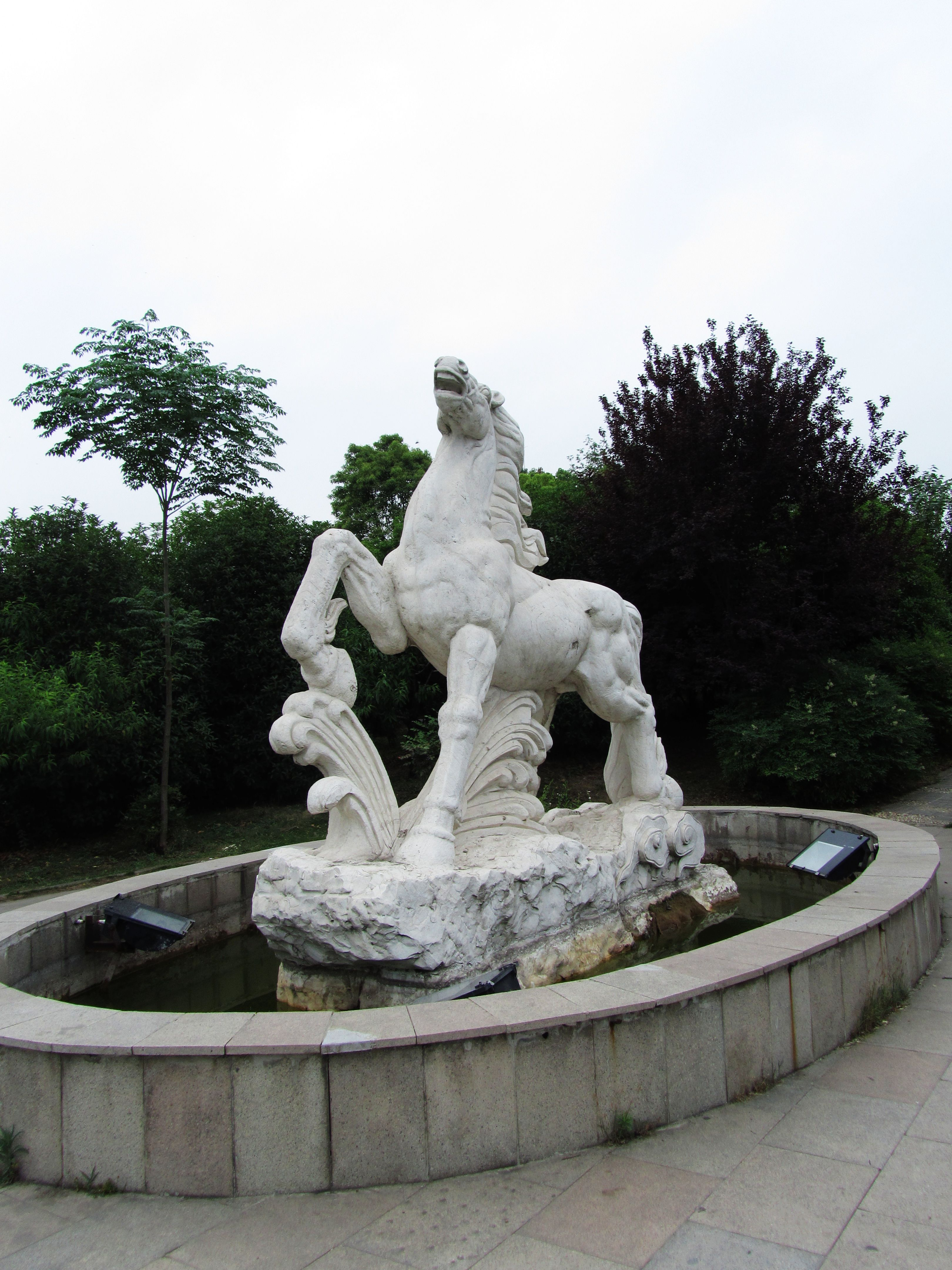
White Horse Park sculpture

White Horse Park, also known as Baima Park, is situated in Xuanwu District, Nanjing, in Jiangsu province. The park is located between Xuanwu Lake and Purple Mountain.

== Description ==
Built in 1999, the 500-acre park features a collection of several hundred stone sculptures and carvings gathered from areas around Nanjing of stone men and women, turtles, horses, tigers and towers. The pieces represent different stone carving styles, eras and disciplines. There is also a variety of original intended uses, like public viewing, religious expression, home use and burial ornamentation.

The sculptures are among more than 10,000 plants, including peach, plum and dawn redwood trees.

== Gallery ==
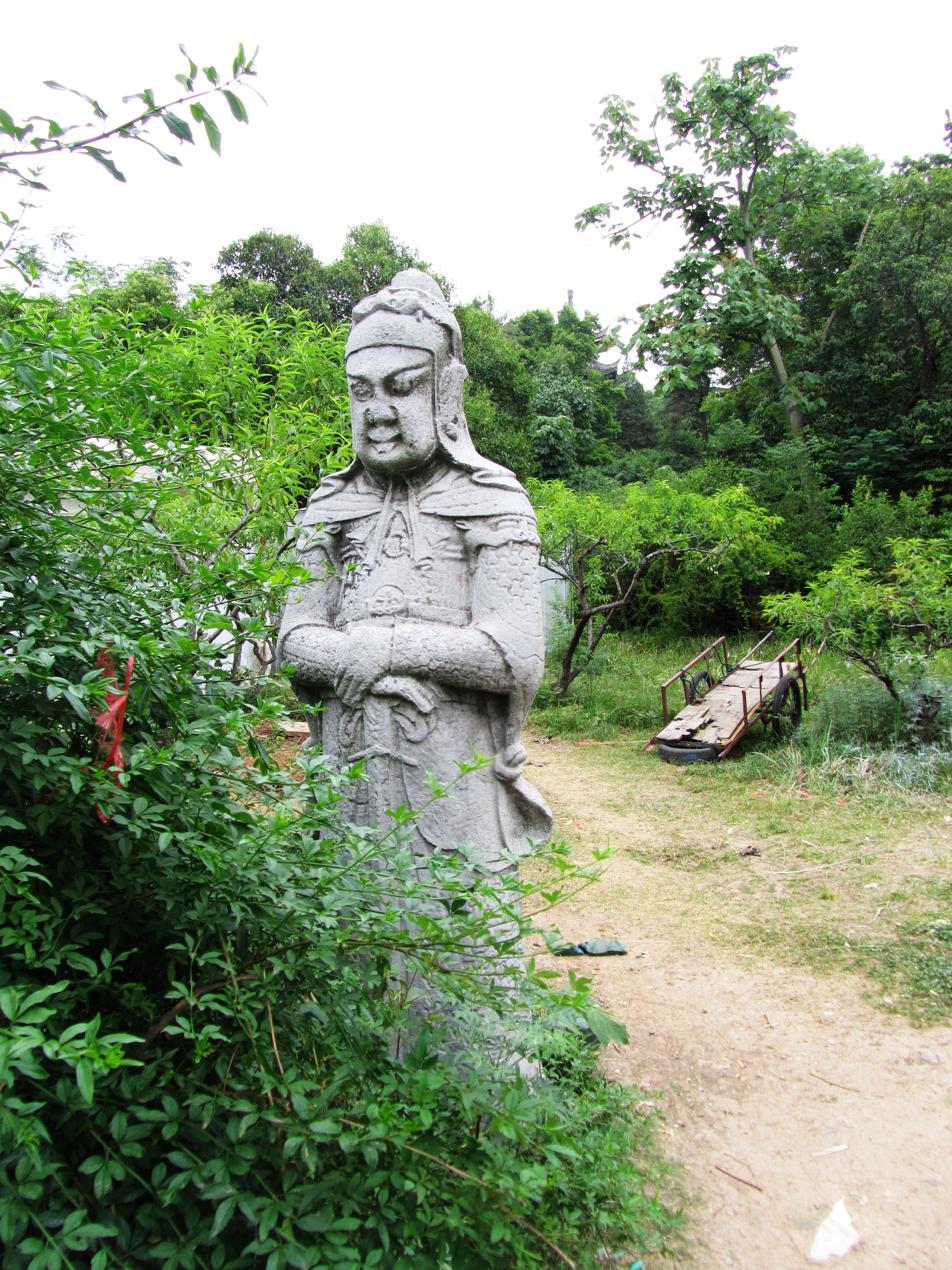

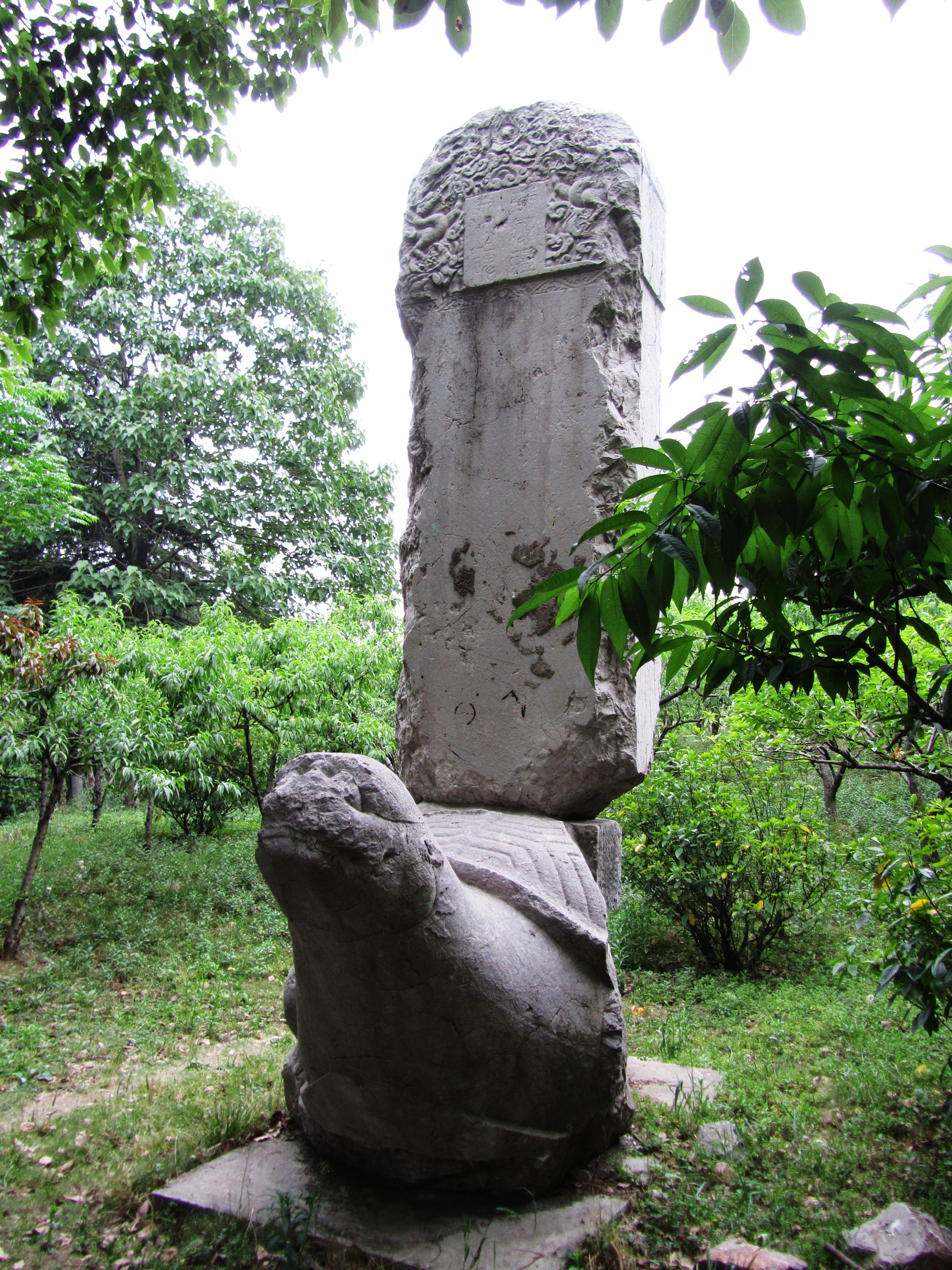

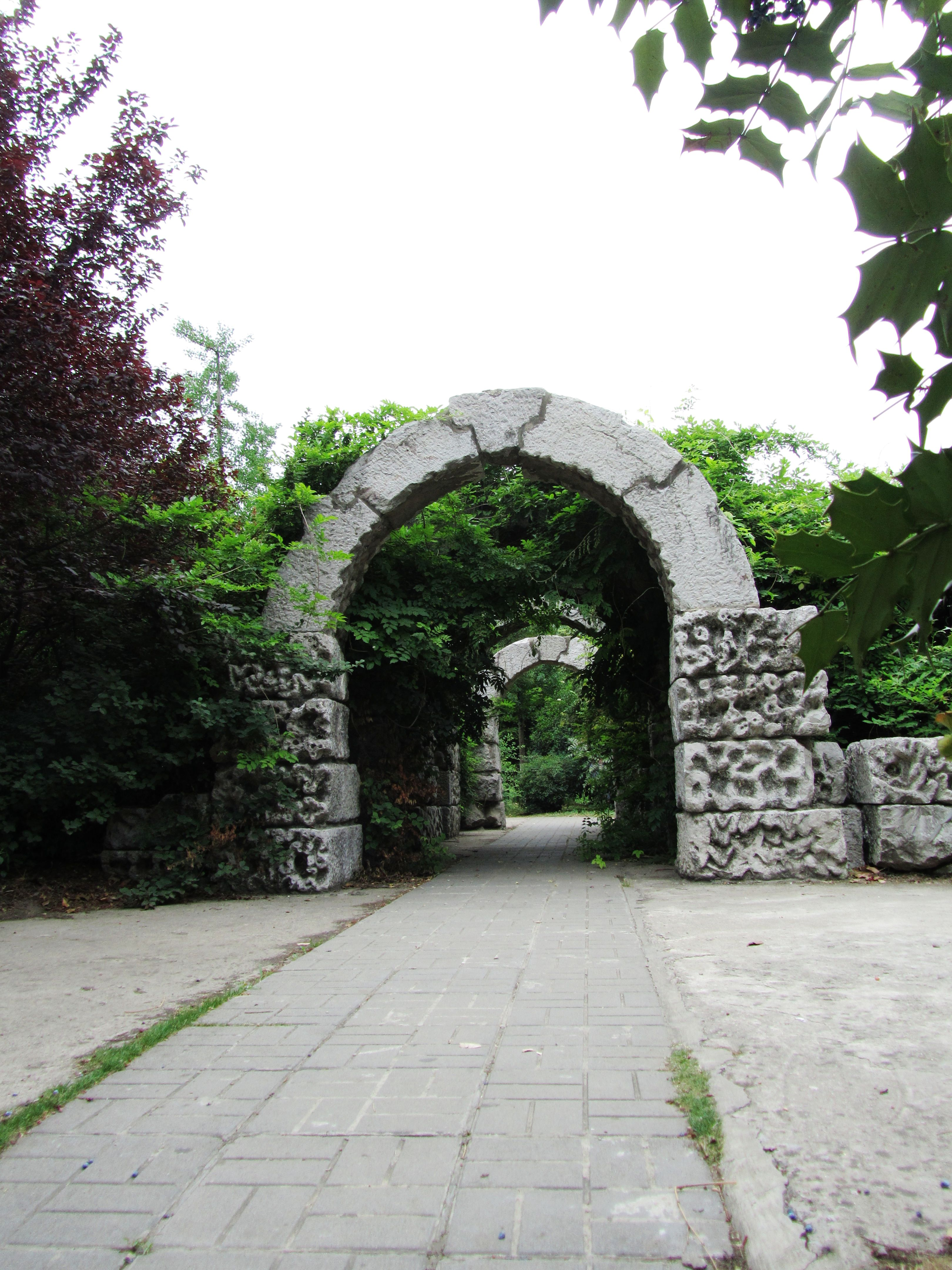

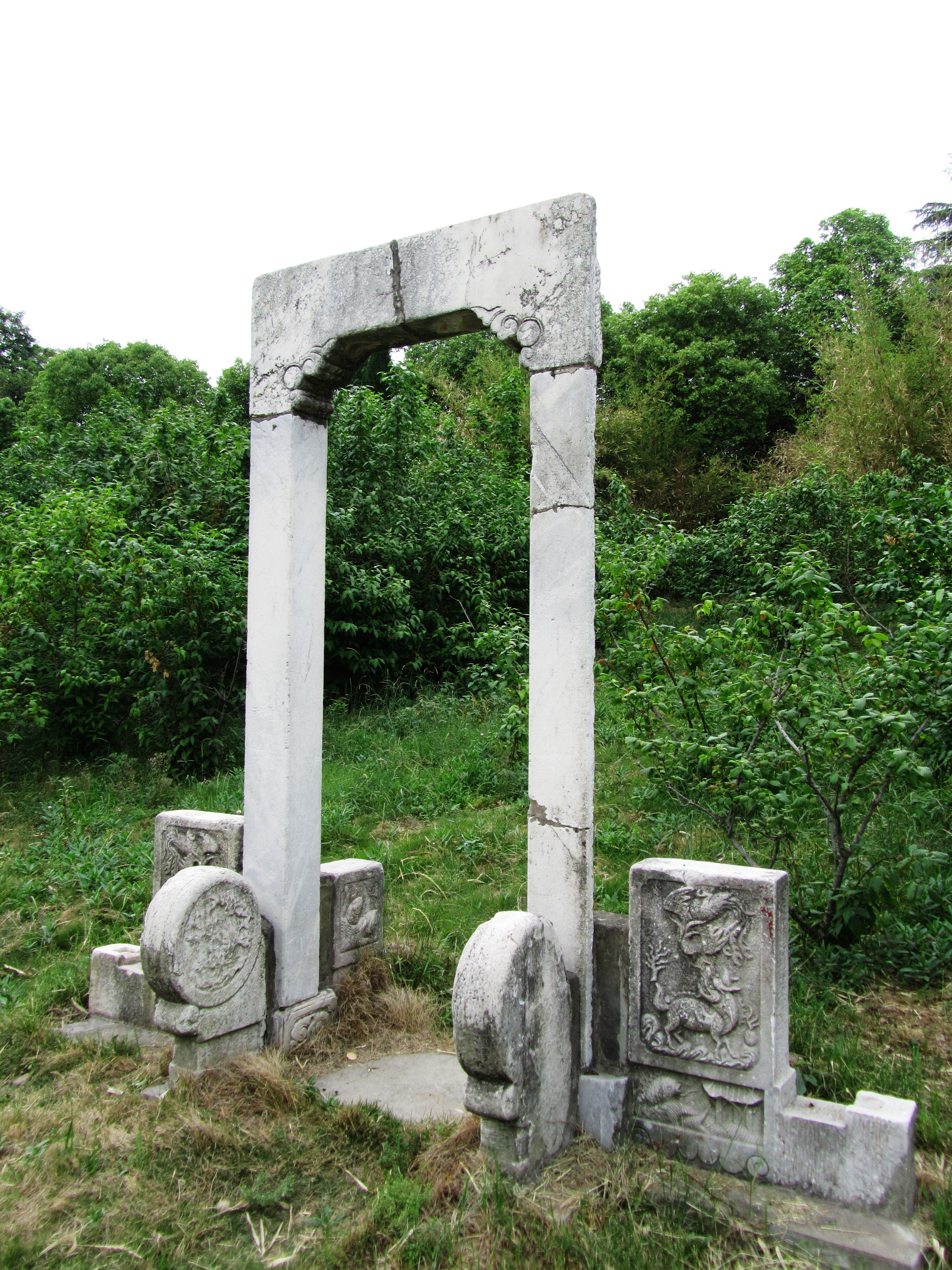
