= Nanjing University of the Arts =

Art school in Nanjing, China

Coordinates: 32°04′01″N 118°45′01″E

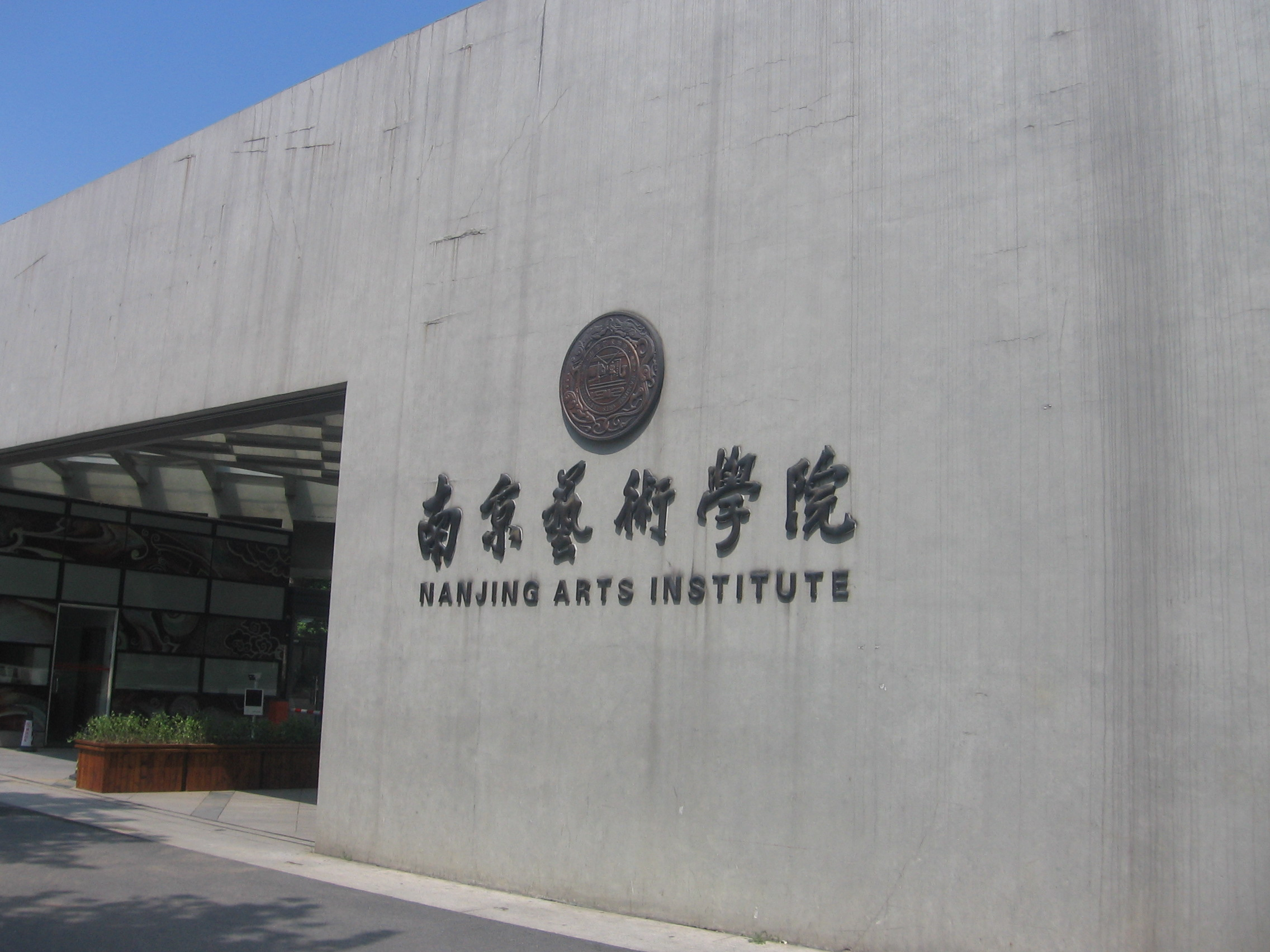
Main entrance

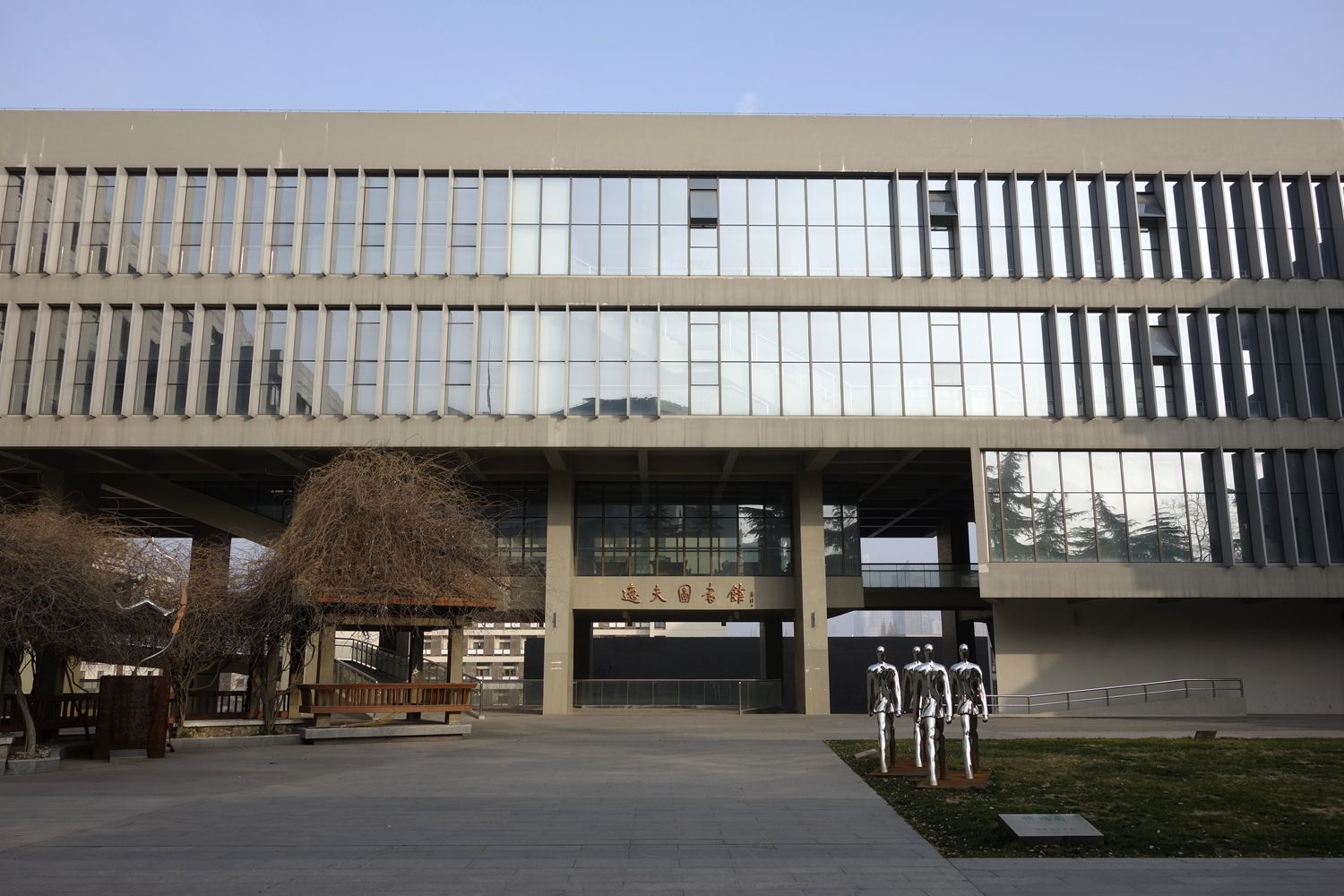
Yifu library

The Nanjing University of the Arts (NUA; Chinese: 南京艺术学院), also known as the Nanjing Arts Institute, is a university offering undergraduate and graduate degrees in fine arts, design, and related subjects.

== History ==
The institutional history begins in 1912, with the foundation of Shanghai Chinese Art College. The name was changed to the Shanghai Academy of Fine Arts of in 1930. The amalgamation of several universities in 1952 produced East China Arts College, situated in Wuxi. In 1958, East China Arts College relocated to Nanjing, and in 1959 it acquired its present name. The lyrics to the school song were written by Cai Yuanpei. The university's partnerships include programs with the University of Dayton and Hokuriku University.

The university is served by the Caochangmen/NUA/JSSNU station of the Nanjing Metro.
