= Line 4 (Nanjing Metro) =

Metro line in Nanjing, China

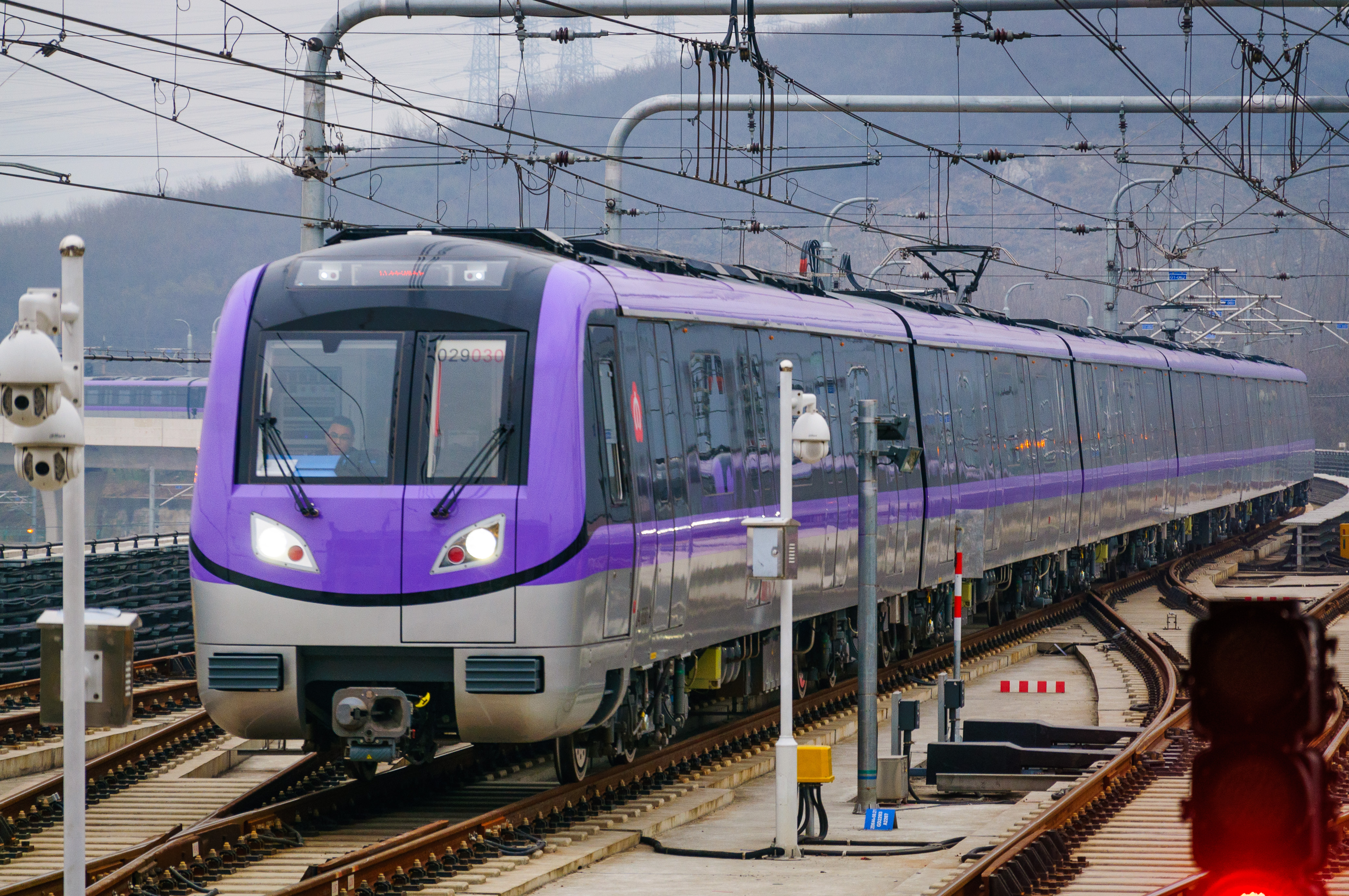
- Rolling stock of Line 4

Overview
- Status: In operation
- Locale: Qixia, Jiangning, Xuanwu and Gulou districts Nanjing, Jiangsu
- Termini: Longjiang; Xianlinhu
- Stations: 18

Service
- Type: Rapid transit
- Operator: Nanjing Metro
- Rolling stock: CRRC Nanjing Puzhen CIVAS

History
- Opened: January 18, 2017; 9 years ago

Technical
- Line length: 33.75 km (21.0 mi)
- Number of tracks: 2
- Character: Underground (except elevated in Xianlinhu)
- Track gauge: 1,435 mm (4 ft 8 1/2 in)

Line 4 is an east–west line on the Nanjing Metro, running from Xianlinhu to Longjiang. It consists of 18 stations and spans a total of 33.75 km (20.97 mi). The line color is purple, and it first opened on January 18, 2017.

== Opening timeline ==
Segment	Commencement	Length	Station(s)	Name
Longjiang — Xianlinhu	January 18, 2017	33.5 km (20.82 mi)	18	Phase 1

== Station list ==

Service routes		Station name		Connections	Distance km		Location
Service routes		English	Chinese	Connections	Distance km		Location
		Zhenzhuquan East	珍珠泉东				Pukou
		Ruilongjiaoye Park	瑞龙郊野公园				Pukou
		Shifosi	石佛寺				Pukou
		Dingshan Street	定山大街				Pukou
		Jiangbei Economic Area	江北商务区	11			Pukou
		Jiangbei Civil Center	江北市民中心				Pukou
		Jiangxinzhoubei (air shaft)	江心洲北（风井）				Jianye
●	●	Longjiang	龙江	9	---	0.000	Gulou
●	●	Caochangmen	草场门	7	1.574	1.574	Gulou
●	●	Yunnanlu	云南路	5	1.828	3.402	Gulou
●	●	Gulou	鼓楼	1	0.821	4.223	Gulou / Xuanwu
●	●	Jimingsi	鸡鸣寺	3	1.359	5.582	Xuanwu
●	●	Jiuhuashan	九华山		0.807	6.389	Xuanwu
●	●	Gangzicun	岗子村	6	1.391	7.780	Xuanwu
●	●	Jiangwangmiao	蒋王庙		2.018	9.798	Xuanwu
●	●	Wangjiawan	王家湾		1.128	10.926	Xuanwu
●	●	Jubaoshan	聚宝山		2.749	13.675	Xuanwu
●	●	Xuzhuang	徐庄		2.569	16.244	Xuanwu
●	●	Jinmalu	金马路	2	2.564	18.808	Qixia
●	●	Huitonglu	汇通路		3.233	22.041	Qixia
●	●	Lingshan	灵山		1.187	23.228	Jiangning
●	●	Dongliu	东流		1.938	25.166	Jiangning
●		Mengbei	孟北		2.454	27.620	Qixia
●		Xiganghuashu	西岗桦墅		2.185	29.805	Qixia
●		Xianlinhu	仙林湖		3.212	33.017	Qixia

== Future plans ==
The second phase of the line will extended it to Zhenzhuquandong station. A further extension to Yujiaying is under planning.
