= Longjiang station =

Metro station in Nanjing, China

Longjiang 龙江
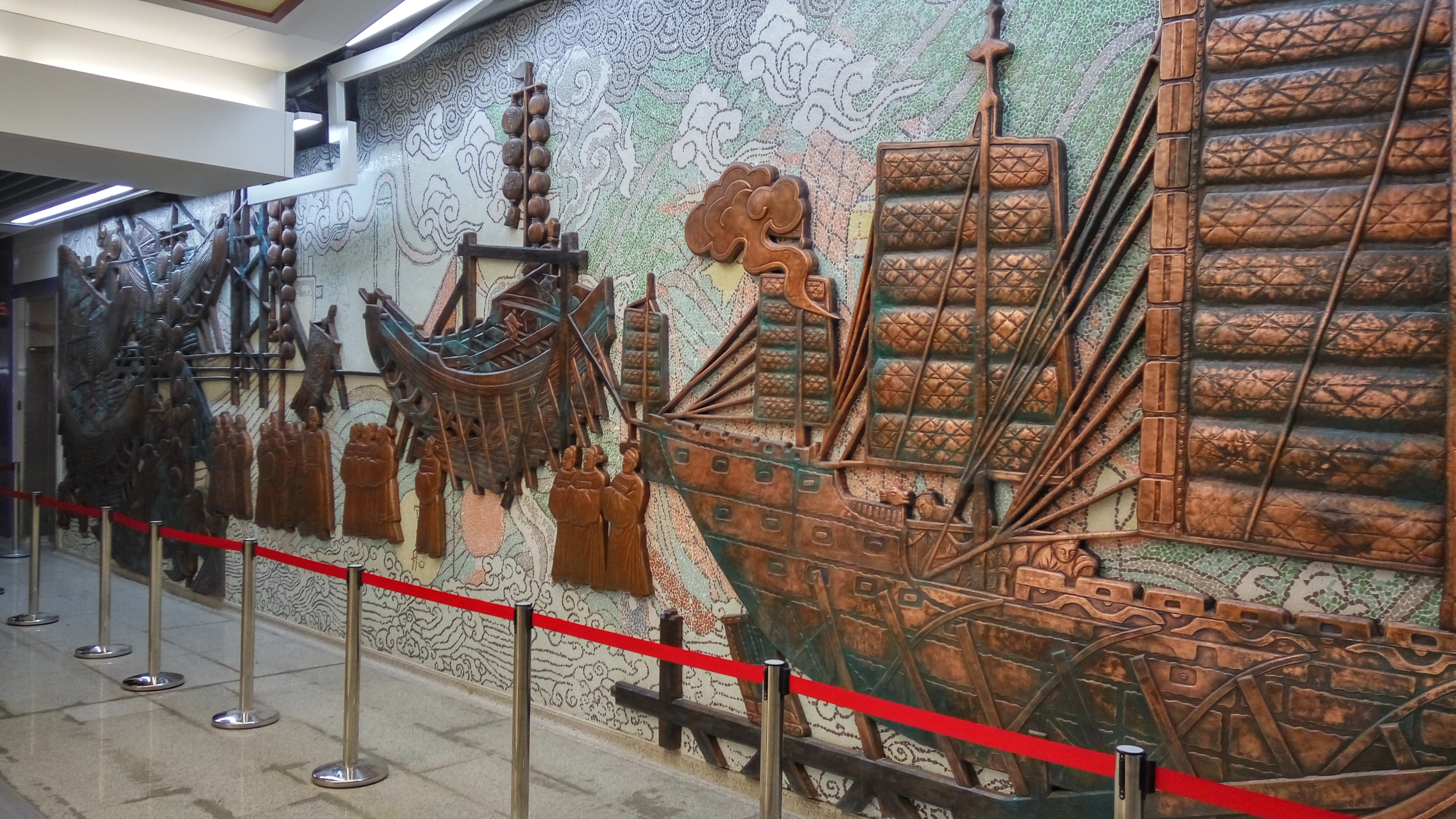
- A mural on the mezzanine level of the station depicting Zheng He's voyages, which started along the Yangtze River near the station.

General information
- Location: Gulou District, Nanjing, Jiangsu; China
- Coordinates: 32.0601°N 118.7344°E
- Operated by: Nanjing Metro Co. Ltd.
- Line: Line 4

Construction
- Structure type: Underground

Other information
- Station code: 418

History
- Opened: 18 January 2017

Services
Preceding station	Nanjing Metro	Following station
Terminus	Line 4	Caochangmen / NUA / JSSNU towards Xianlinhu
Location

Longjiang station (Chinese: 龙江站) is a station on Line 4 of the Nanjing Metro, named after the unofficial local name for the surrounding neighborhood. It is the western terminus of Phase I of Line 4, which opened on January 18, 2017, alongside seventeen other stations. On its first day of passenger service, Longjiang station carried 10,680 people, more than any of the other new stations that also opened that day. The station is oriented on an east–west axis, underneath the intersection of Lijiang Road and Caochangmen Street, and has a total of 9 exits.

Longjiang station will also be a transfer station for the planned Line 9 of the Nanjing Metro.
