= Xianlinhu station =

Metro station in Nanjing, China

Coordinates: 32.1275°N 118.9872°E

Xianlinhu 仙林湖
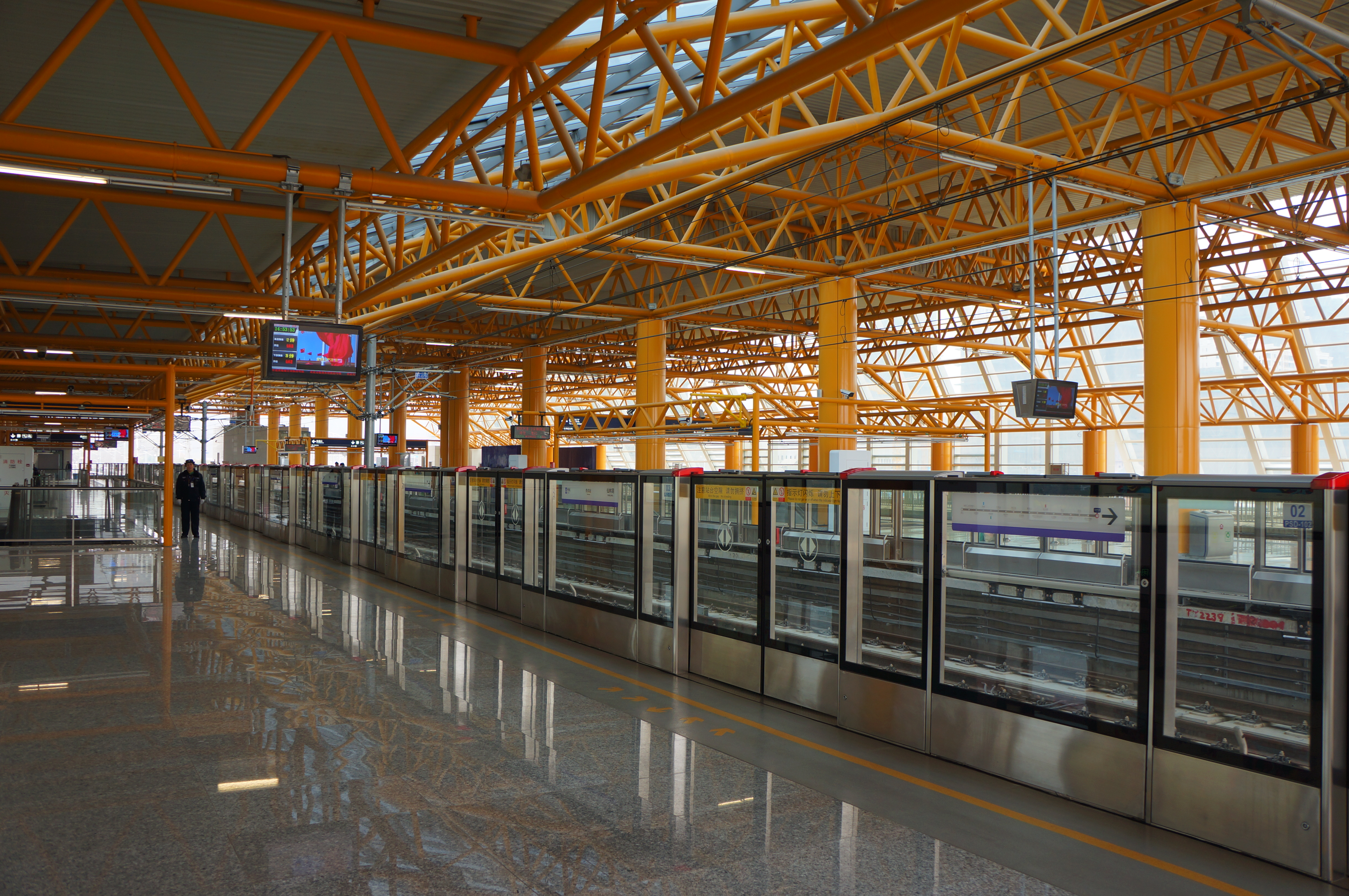

General information
- Location: Qixia District, Nanjing, Jiangsu; China
- Operator: Nanjing Metro Co. Ltd.
- Line: Line 4

Construction
- Structure type: Elevated

Other information
- Station code: 401

History
- Opened: 18 January 2017

Services
Preceding station	Nanjing Metro	Following station
Xiganghuashu towards Longjiang	Line 4	Terminus
Location

Xianlinhu station (Chinese: 仙林湖站) is a station on Line 4 of the Nanjing Metro and planned interchange station with the future Line S5. It is the eastern terminus of Line 4, which opened on January 18, 2017 alongside seventeen other stations. Located on the eastern edge of Nanjing's suburban Qixia District, it is the only elevated station among the Phase I stations, and is located at the intersection of Weidi Road and Guangzhi Road.

Xianlinhu Station is named after the nearby Xianlin Lake Park.
