= List of Nanjing Massacre memorials =

The Memorial Sites of the Nanjing Massacre (Chinese: 侵华日军南京大屠杀遗址纪念碑) comprise a collection of monuments established by the municipal government of Nanjing alongside various organizations and individuals to honor the victims of the Nanjing Massacre perpetrated by the Japanese invading forces. These memorials are situated at locations where mass killings occurred and at the remnants of burial sites for the victims. The inaugural monument was established in 1947, and by 2009, there existed a total of 23 monuments commemorating the victims of the Nanjing Massacre.

These include the Xiaguan Power Plant, the Tomb of the Guangdong Army, Yijiangmen, Zhongshan Dock, Coal Harbor, Torpedo Battalion, Caoxiao Gorge, Yantziji, Eastern Suburb, Jiangdongmen, Pudu Temple, Shangxinhe, Hanzhongmen, Qingliang Mountain, Wutaishan, North Pole Pavilion, Zhengjue Temple, Jinling University, Flower Goddess Temple, Xianhemen, Taiping Men, Hushan Village, and Xigangtou, which encompasses clusters of burial sites.

== Memorials to the Sites ==
Memorial Sites of the Nanjing Massacre
#	Name of monument	Photo	Location	Time of Erection	Unit for Erection	Note
1	Xiaguan Power Plant Monument to Dead Workers (下关发电厂死难工人纪念碑)		Gulou, Nanjing; Xiaguan Power Plant	Built on April 17, 1947; Remodeled on June 15, 1951; Moved in July 2000	Xiaguan Power Plant	Initially referred to as the “Martyrs Monument,” the capital power plant was established on April 17, 1947. In 1951, another memorial was constructed to honor the present, merging the commemoration of the power plant associated with the Nanjing Massacre, which resulted in the deaths of 45 workers, and the Republic of China Air Force air raids in 1950 that claimed 2 workers' lives, thereafter relocating to the original location.
2	Yijiangmen Conglomerate Burial Ground Monument (挹江门丛葬地纪念碑)		Gulou, Nanjing; Outside Yijiangmen and inside Hydrangea Park	August 15, 1985	Nanjing Municipal People's Government	The Yijiangmen neighborhood is one of the sites where the remains of my compatriots, who perished during the Nanjing Massacre by the invading Japanese army, are interred in clusters. Between December 1937 and May 1938, the Nanjing Chongshantang, along with other philanthropic organizations, gathered the remains of over 5,100 victims in six consecutive batches and interred them at Yijiangmen's East City Roots and the adjacent Jiangjiajia Pomegranate Garden.
3	Memorial to the Victims at the Zhongshan Wharf (中山码头遇难同胞纪念碑)		Gulou, Nanjing; Zhongshan Wharf by the riverside roadside, at the intersection of Jianning West Road	August 15, 1985	Nanjing Municipal People's Government	Zhongshan Wharf is a location of the Nanjing Massacre perpetrated by the invading Japanese army, where over 10,000 young and able-bodied refugees, seeking safety in the International Safety Zone, were ruthlessly killed. On the evening of December 16, 1937, the Japanese army apprehended a so-called "soldier" among the refugees residing in the former Overseas Chinese Guest House, suspected of being linked to over 5,000 individuals. They were collectively executed by machine-gunning and subsequently disposed of in the river. On December 18, the Japanese forces, in addition to the refugees residing in Dafang Lane, sought out around 4,000 young individuals, who were subsequently executed by machine-gun fire. In this instance, the Japanese troops also shot more than 800 refugees near Nantong Road, North Mai Di, and the banks of the Nine A Wei River.
4	Memorial to the Victims at the Coal Harbor (煤炭港遇难同胞纪念碑)		Gulou, Nanjing; East Fortress Street	August 15, 1985	Nanjing Municipal People's Government	Coal Harbor is a principal location of the Nanjing Massacre during the Japanese invasion of China. On December 17, 1937, the Japanese army apprehended over 3,000 disarmed soldiers and civilians from various regions of China, detaining them along the downstream riverside of Coal Harbor, where they were executed by machine-gun fire. Those who were wounded but still alive were subsequently transported to nearby thatched huts and incinerated, including forty-five employees of the capital power plant.
5	Memorial to the Victims at the Yulei Camp (鱼雷营遇难同胞纪念碑)		Gulou, Nanjing; Northeast corner of Jinling Shipyard	December 13, 2015		On the night of December 15, 1937, the invading Japanese army executed around 9,000 civilians, along with disarmed officers and soldiers, who had been apprehended in Nanking, by transporting them to the Yulei Camp and subjecting them to mass machine-gun fire. In the same month, the Japanese troops at the Yulei Camp and Baota Bridge area again slaughtered almost 30,000 individuals. The victims' remains were exposed in the barracks dock and other locations, deplorable, until February 1938. Subsequently, the Red Swastika interred bodies at the site, with over 5,000 corpses buried over the span of three days: February 19, 21 and 22.
6	Memorial to the Victims at the Caoxiexia (草鞋峡遇难同胞纪念碑)		Gulou, Nanjing; 200 meters east of Sangwon Gate beneath Mufu Mountain; 32.1186752319°N 118.766189575°E	1985	Nanjing Municipal People's Government	On December 13, 1937, following the Japanese invasion and occupation of Nanjing, over 57,000 refugees and disarmed Chinese soldiers fled along the river at Xiaguan, to be captured by the Japanese army and imprisoned at the base of Mufu Mountain. On the night of December 18, the Japanese army escorted the remaining refugees to Caoxuexia, where they were executed en masse by machine gun fire. A limited number of injured but not deceased Chinese individuals were then killed by the Japanese army using bayonets; following this, the Japanese army committed arson, leaving all remains abandoned in the river.
7	Memorial to the Victims at the Swallow Rock (燕子矶江滩遇难同胞纪念碑)		Swallow Rock, Qixia District; 32.1495285034°N 118.81312561°E	August 1985	Nanjing Municipal People's Government	In December 1937, during the onset of the Japanese invasion of China, refugees from Nanjing surged in large numbers, including over 30,000 disarmed soldiers and more than 20,000 civilians, who congregated at the banks of the Yanzi Jie river, attempting to cross northward to escape. Japanese ships were blockaded and subsequently encircled by a substantial contingent of Japanese forces, who then unleashed machine-gun fire, resulting in the deaths of almost 50,000 individuals.
8	Memorial to the Victims at the Jiangdong Gateway (江东门遇难同胞纪念碑)		Jianye District; Pebble Square in Memorial Hall of the Victims in Nanjing Massacre by Japanese Invaders	August 15, 1985	Nanjing Municipal People's Government	
9	Monument to the Pude Temple Clump Burial Ground (普德寺丛葬地纪念碑)		Yuhuatai District; Nanjing Radio and Television Service Center Television Tower	August 1985	Nanjing Municipal People's Government	
10	Memorial to Victims at Shangxinhe(上新河地区遇难同胞纪念碑)		Jianye District; Cotton Dike			
11	Memorial to Victims at Hanzhong Gate (汉中门外遇难同胞纪念碑)		Gulou, Nanjing; Hanzhongmen Bridge	August 15, 1985	Nanjing Municipal People's Government; People's Government of Gulou District	
12	Memorial to Victims at Qingliang Mountain (清凉山遇难同胞纪念碑)		Gulou, Nanjing; Next to the auditorium on the Hohai University Qingliangshan Park Campus	August 15, 1985	Nanjing Municipal People's Government; East China Institute of Water Resources	
13	Memorial to Victims at Beiji Ge (北极阁附近遇难同胞纪念碑)		Xuanwu District; North side of East Beijing Road-Jinxianghe Road at the southern foot of Arctic Pavilion; 32.0604°N 118.7857°E	August 15, 1985	Nanjing Municipal People's Government; People's Government of Xuanwu District	
14	Memorial to Victims at Zhengjue Temple (正觉寺遇难同胞纪念碑)		Qinhuai District; Wudingmen, Changle Road	December 13, 1987	Nanjing Municipal People's Government	
15	Eastern Suburbs Burial Ground Memorial (东郊丛葬地纪念碑)		East of Linggu Temple; 32.049373°N 118.861705°E	Reestablished in May 1988	Nanjing Municipal People's Government	
16	Wutaishan Burial Ground Memorial (五台山丛葬地纪念碑)		Gulou, Nanjing; Southwest corner of Nanjing Wutaishan Stadium	July 1988	Nanjing Municipal People's Government; People's Government of Gulou District	
17	Jinling University Refugee Shelter and Monument to the Victims (金陵大学难民收容所及遇难同胞纪念碑)		Gulou, Nanjing; Department of Astronomy, Gulou Campus, Nanjing University	1996年5月	Nanjing Municipal People's Government; Nanjing University	
18	Flower Temple Area Bush Burial Site Memorial (花神庙地区丛葬地纪念碑)		Yuhuatai entrance of Yuhua Gongdeyuan; 31.98906°N 118.768151°E	Re-established in December 2001	Nanjing Municipal People's Government; People's Government of Yuhuatai District	
19	Tangshan Hushan Village "Learning from History" Monument (汤山湖山村“以史为鉴”碑)		Hushan Village, Tangshan Street, Jiangning District; Village Cemetery	August 15, 2005	Hushan Village	
20	Xigangtou Memorial (西岗头纪念碑)		Xigangtou Natural Village, Tangshan Street, Jiangning District; Cemetery of Xigangtou Village	April 5, 2006	Xigangtou Village	
21	Memorial to Victims at Xianhe Gateway (仙鹤门遇难同胞纪念碑)		Qixia District; 2 Xianhemen Road; 32.09267°N 118.89445°E	2007	Nanjing Municipal People's Government	
22	Memorial to Victims at Taiping Gateway (太平门遇难同胞纪念碑)	南京大屠杀太平门遇难同胞纪念碑	Xuanwu District; Near the Xuanwu Lake; 32.06101°N 118.807933°E	December 13, 2007	Nanjing Municipal People's Government, Association for the Promotion of Sino-Japanese Friendship among Overseas Chinese in Japan (旅日华侨中日友好促进会)	On December 13, 1937, the 16th Division of the 33rd Wing, Sixth Squadron, along with other invading Japanese forces near Taipingmen, Nanjing, compelled approximately 1,300 Chinese officers, soldiers, and innocent civilians to surrender. They were encircled by barbed wire and pre-buried mines, subjected to machine gun fire, and subsequently doused with gasoline and incinerated. The following day, the Japanese army conducted a further examination of the corpses, using bayonets to finish off the near-dead, culminating in the collective massacre at Taipingmen. No Chinese individuals survived the Taipingmen slaughter. In 2007, to honor the innocent Chinese victims near Taipingmen, the Memorial Hall of the Victims of the Nanjing Massacre of the Japanese invasion, the Association for the Promotion of Sino-Japanese Friendship and Exchanges among Overseas Chinese Travelers in Japan, the National Liaison Association of Japan commemorating the 70th Anniversary of the Nanjing Massacre victims, and the Japanese delegation of the “Mindfulness of Nanking” collaboratively erected a monument at this site.
23	Tombstone of Martyrs of the Anti-Japanese Cantonese Army (抗日粤军烈士墓碑)		Zhangwangmiao, Central Gateway	Moved in October 1941; Rebuilt in December 2000	Guangdong Villa Council	In 1937, Guangdong soldiers participated in the Battle of Shanghai, with the wounded remaining at the Bafutang Hospital in Nanjing. On December 13, 1937, Japanese troops seized Nanjing, where the medically wounded were slaughtered and thereafter hastily interred in the countryside by the Guangdong Fellowship Association. In July 2000, the Guangdong Villa Council conducted a research to raise funds for the renovation of the victims' mausoleum to honor the pioneers.

== See also ==
- Nanjing Massacre
- Memorial Hall for the Victims of the Nanjing Massacre
