= Jiangxin Island =

Jiangxin Island 江心洲
- Island
- Interactive map of Jiangxin Island
- Coordinates: 32°1′51.76″N 118°42′4.79″E
- Country: China
- Province: Jiangsu
- Sub-provincial city: Nanjing
- District: Jianye

Area
  - Total: 15 km^{2} (5.8 sq mi)
- Time zone: UTC+8 (China Standard)
- Area code: 25

Jiangxin Island
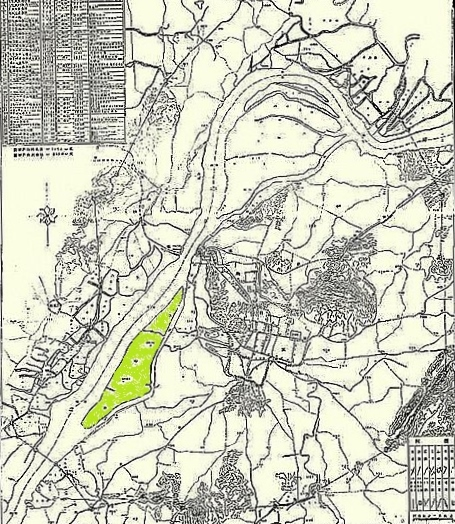
- Nanjing in 1929, with Jiangxin Island shaded in green
- Chinese: 江心洲
- Literal meaning: Midriver Islet; Islet at the Heart of the Yangtze
Transcriptions
Standard Mandarin
- Hanyu Pinyin: Jiāngxīnzhōu
- Wade–Giles: Chiang-hsin-chou; Chiang-hsin Island

Jiangxin Island or Jingxinzhou is a spear-shaped island in the middle of the Yangtze east of Jianye District in Nanjing, China. It is approximately 6.5 km (4.0 mi) from the city's downtown district.

The island is best known for the wide variety of grapes produced on the island and its annual Grape Festival. Because of the rich vegetation on the island, the air quality is better than most other places in the city and it is a national scenic area. Beginning in 2009, an economic development project began to create an eco-urban city that has a low carbon impact, has renewable energy use, and creates a sustainable residential, and commercial community. The three-phase project is targeted for completion in 2020.

== Overview ==
The island is known for its grapes; it has about 130 varieties which range from small creamy green to ping-pong sized purple grapes. During July and August the Nanjing government hosts an annual Grape Festival (江心洲葡萄节). About 50,000 people visit the festival each year. To support tourism, restaurants, farmhouses, and hotels have been built so that visitors can pick grapes, eat rural food, and access quality services.

On the southern tip of the island is a forest park. The island is also known for its Folk and Culture Village. It has market gardens, canals, ponds, and redwood avenues. Due to its scenic areas, it is designated a National Grade AA scenic area and one of the city's four "green lungs".

== Eco urbanization ==
The island is also undergoing urbanization to be completed in three stages by 2020. The City of Nanjing, Jiangsu Provincial Government, and the Sino Singapore Eco High Tech Island Development Company have partnered to urbanize about 750 hectares, or one half, of the island. Its plan is to maintain much of the island's existing scenic environment while creating multi-story and high-rise residential housing for up to 200,000 people on 182 acres of land along canals, a new metro station, and additional recreational and commercial enterprises. The "garden city" plan includes low carbon strategies, such as water reclamation, green energy and sustainable development. The RMB 100 billion development enterprise has partnered with Bayer Material Science to design low and zero energy buildings. The buildings will operate on renewable sources, like hydrogen and solar energy. Other sources of energy are photovoltaic power and wind power, with energy managed via smart grid. Buses will run on electricity. Modern agricultural and service industries, Information technology (IT) firms and eco-environmental service organizations are targeted to expand the island's economy. There will be no manufacturing businesses or factories. The southern section of the island has a forest park, adjacent to the Youth Forest Park on the mainland. Before the project is completed additional recreational facilities will be expanded to include an aquarium, a wedding themed square, and entertainment features like a roller coaster and a water activity feature.

Construction began on the project in May 2009. The first phase of the project includes infrastructure development, such as gas and water pipelines and roads. Residents on about one-half of the island have been resettled. In August 2013 a model economical apartment was shown to residents and visitors of the island.

== Transportation ==
The island may be reached via the Yingtian Street Elevated Bridge (应天大街高架), which is a 760 m (2,490 ft) bridge that connects the island, and to the mainland at the Nanjing International Expo Center. For the 2014 Summer Youth Olympics, it was a means of traveling from its YOG Forest Park to the Nanjing International Expo Center. It is the first pedestrian bridge to cross the Yangtze.

There is ferry service to the island from the Mianhuadi Ferry, which is located by Binjiang Park on the Yangtze. It arrives along the southeastern shore of the island at the Jiangxinzhou Automobile Ferry (江心洲汽车渡口). Ferry service is offered through 13 boats from the Zhongshan wharf, which is also known as Zhongshan Pier. It is located at North Zhongshan Road and the Yangtze River. Starting the summer of 2014, Nanjing Ferry Service shuttles passengers, standard bicycles, and electric bikes from the Zhongshan wharf. The ferries are air-conditioned and the ride is about 10 minutes. Other ferry locations on the island are Jiangxin Passenger Ferry off of Puyuan Road, on the southeastern shore of the island and north of the Jiangxin Automobile Ferry site. On the northeast shore of the island are the Haunzhou Road Passenger Ferry (环洲路客渡口) and Hongwei Passenger Ferry (红卫客渡口) sites.

There is also local city bus service to the island.

== Photos ==
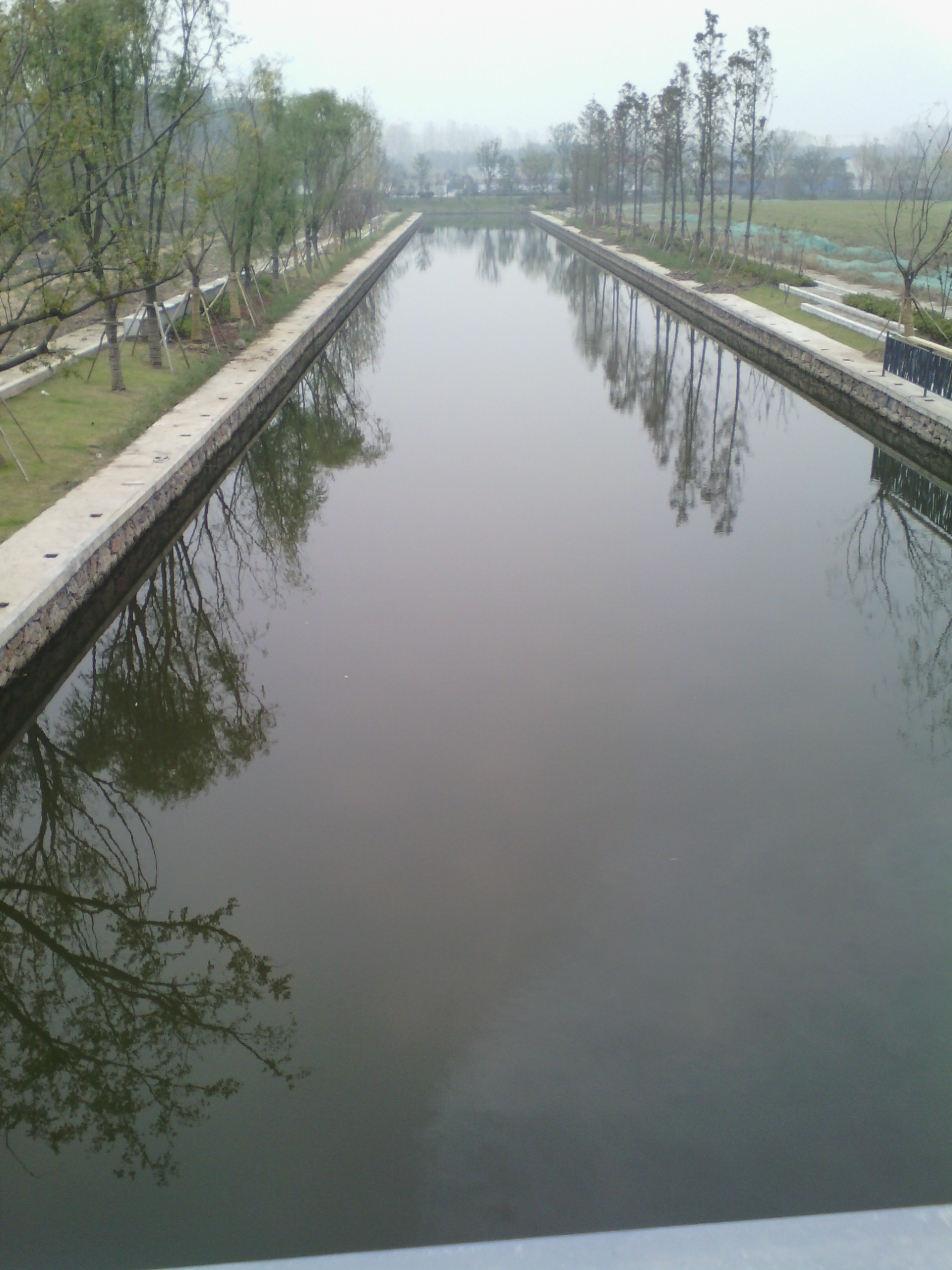
River landscape

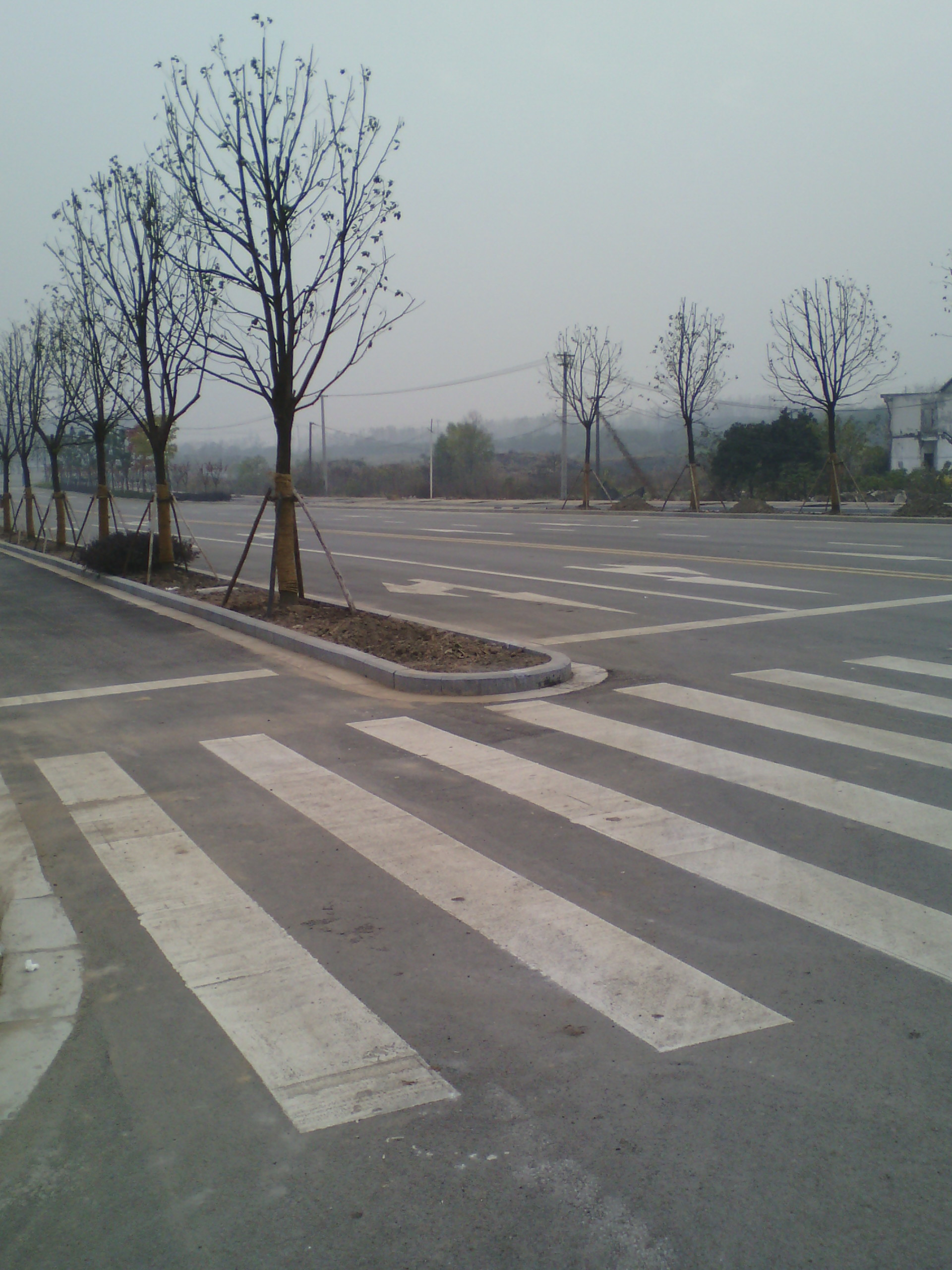
Newly constructed road

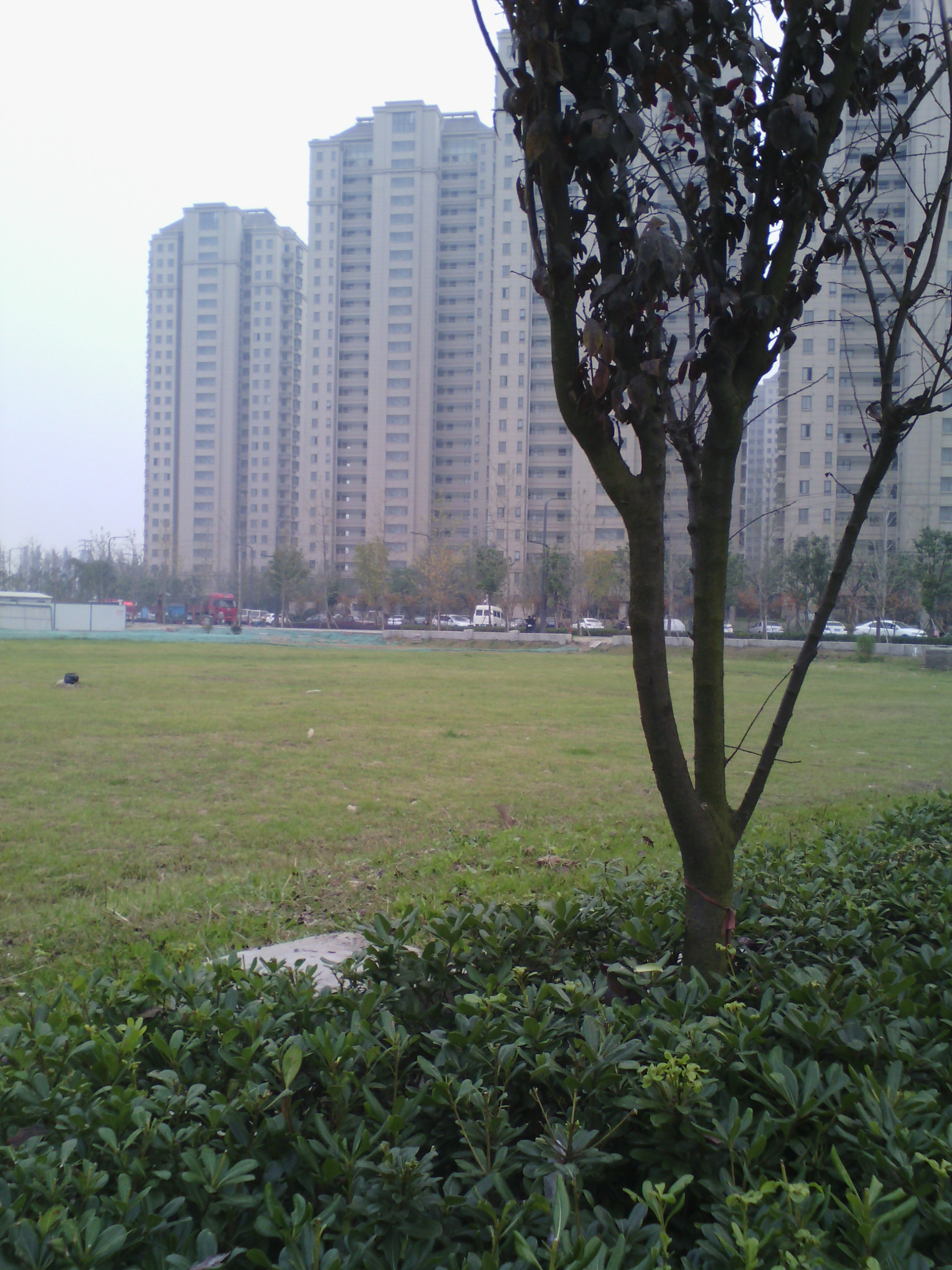
Jiangxin New Town

== See also ==
- Nanjing Yangtze Tunnel
