= Yunjinlu station =

Nanjing Metro station

Coordinates: 32°02′07″N 118°44′51″E

Yunjinlu 云锦路
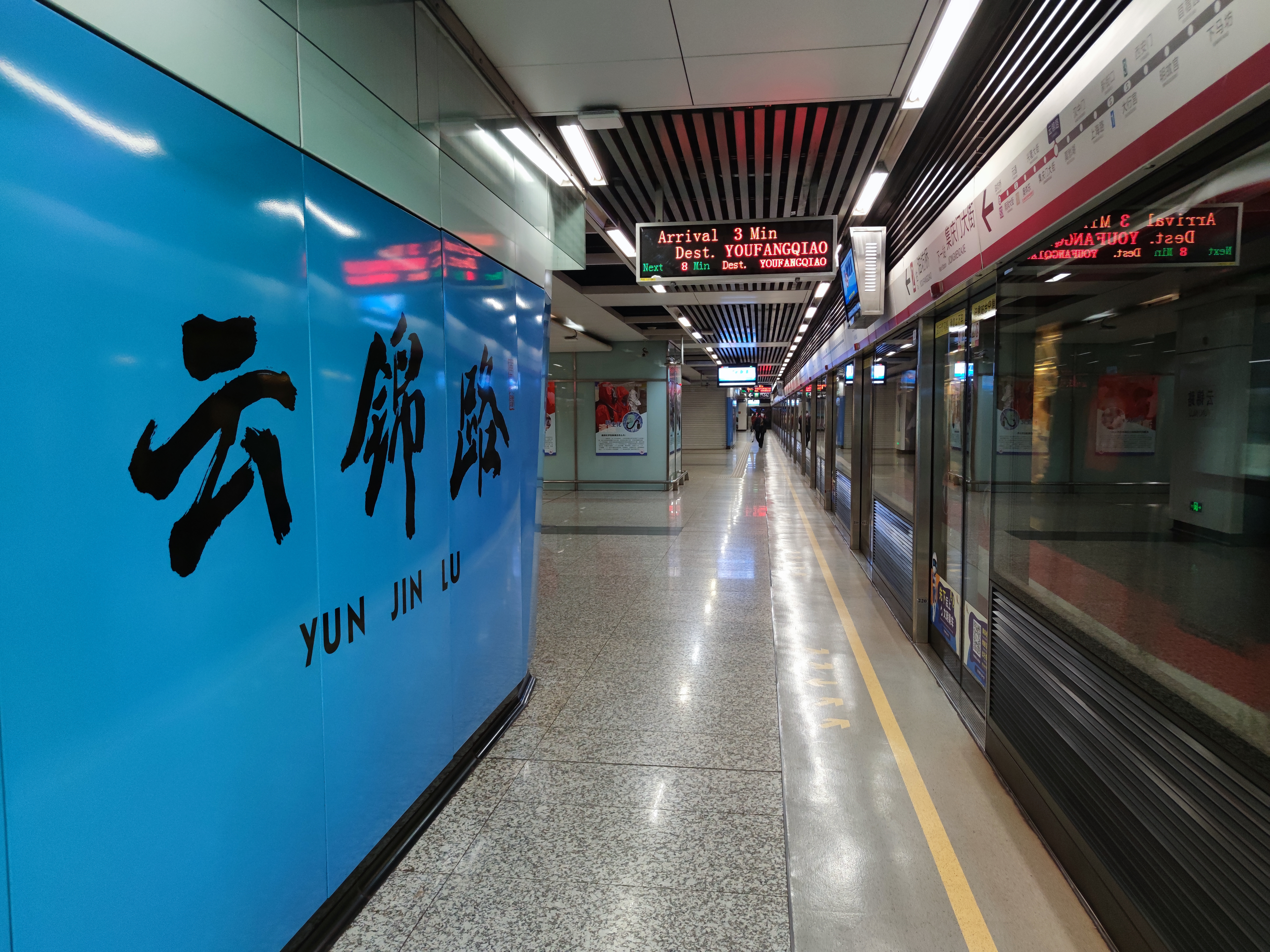

General information
- Location: Shuiximen Street (水西门大街) and Yunjin Road; Jianye District, Nanjing, Jiangsu; China
- Operated by: Nanjing Metro Co. Ltd.
- Line(s): Line 2

Construction
- Structure type: Underground

Other information
- Station code: 211

History
- Opened: 28 May 2010

Services
Preceding station	Nanjing Metro	Following station
Jiqingmendajie towards Yuzui	Line 2	Mochouhu towards Jingtianlu

Yunjinlu station (simplified Chinese: 云锦路站; traditional Chinese: 雲錦路站; pinyin: Yúnjǐnlù Zhàn; lit. 'Yunjin Road station') is a station of Line 2 of the Nanjing Metro. It started operations on 28 May 2010 along with the rest of Line 2.

Known as Chating station (茶亭站; Chátíng Zhàn) during planning stages, it was renamed Yunjinlu station in 2007 to promote the accession of yunjin (brocade), a product characteristic of Nanjing, to the UNESCO Intangible Cultural Heritage Lists. The station is decorated with a Qingming theme.

== Around the station ==
- Nanjing Massacre Memorial Hall
