= Nanjing Yingtian Avenue Yangtze River Tunnel =

Road tunnel in Nanjing, China

Nanjing Yingtian Avenue Yangtze River Tunnel 南京应天大街长江隧道
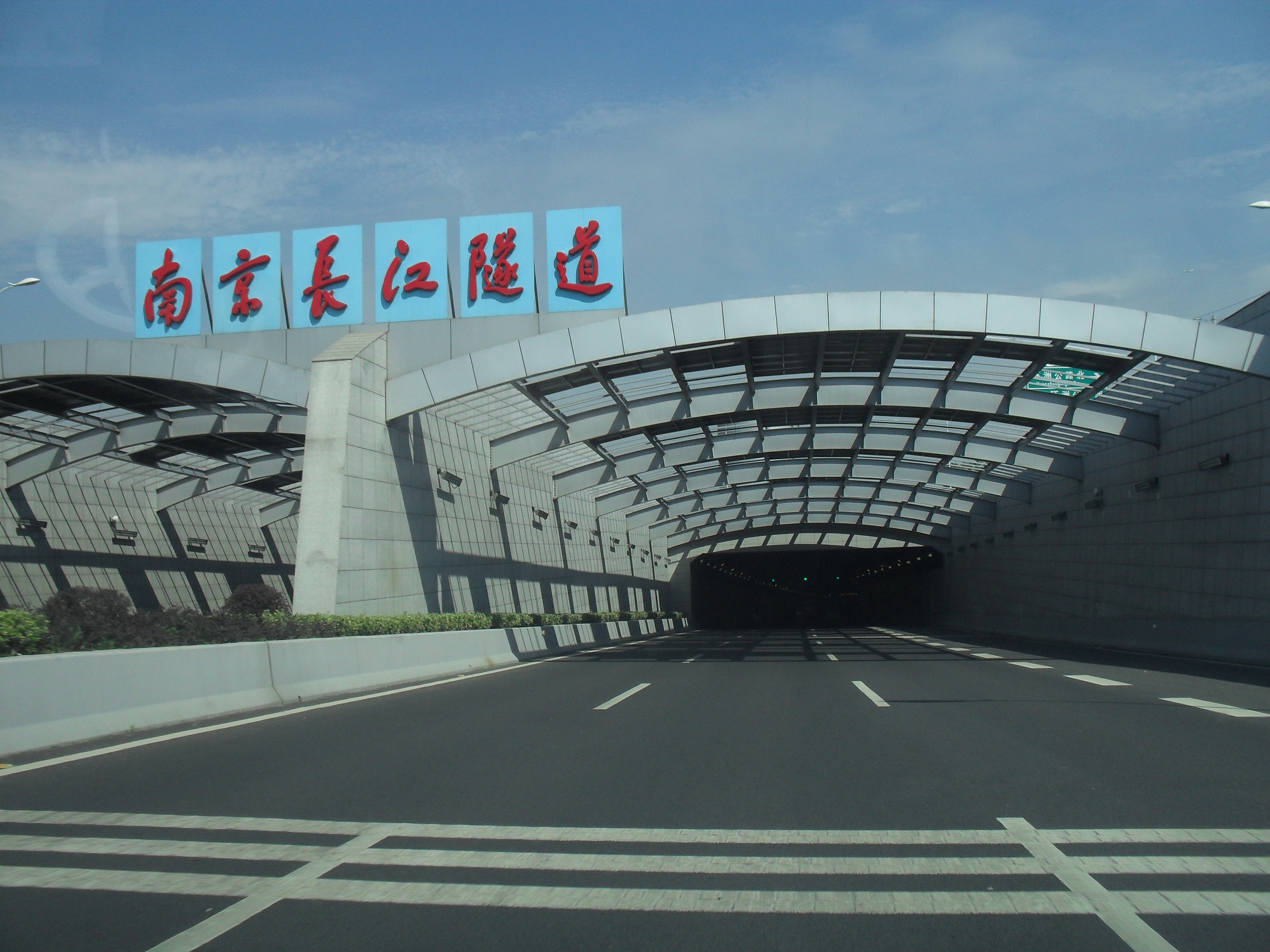
- Entrance to the tunnel
- Interactive map of Nanjing Yingtian Avenue Yangtze River Tunnel 南京应天大街长江隧道

Overview
- Location: Nanjing, Jiangsu - under the Yangtze River
- Coordinates: 32.0415°N 118.6867°E
- Start: Jiangxin Island
- End: Pukou

Operation
- Constructed: 2005 - 2010
- Opened: May 28, 2010
- Owner: China Railway Construction Corporation (80%)

Technical
- Length: 3,837 metres (12,589 ft)
- No. of lanes: 2 x 3
- Width: 13.3 metres (44 ft)

The Nanjing Yingtian Avenue Yangtze River Tunnel, formerly Nanjing Yangtze River Tunnel, is a tunnel under the Yangtze River in Nanjing, China. The tunnel connects the Pukou District to Jiangxin Island in the city of Nanjing. Construction of the tunnel began in 2005. The tunnel broke through in 2009 and was opened in May 2010. The tunnel has renamed on 20 December 2019.

The road continues over the Jiajiang Bridge, crossing the smaller Jiajiang branch of the river, into the Jianye District of Nanjing.

== See also ==
- Yangtze River bridges and tunnels
