= Shangxinhe =

Former town in Nanjing, China

Coordinates: 32°01′30″N 118°43′17″E

Location in Jiangsu

Shangxinhe (Chinese: 上新河镇; pinyin: Shàngxīnhé Zhèn; lit. 'New River Town') is a former town in the Jianye District of Nanjing, China located on the Jia River (夹江), a tributary of the Yangtze River. The former Wang Hanzhou residence, Jianghan Hall (江汉会馆), Ancient Sun Palace (古太阳宫), and other ancient cultural sites are located in the area.

== History ==
=== Ming dynasty ===
During the early Ming dynasty, Shangxinhe embarked on the creation of infrastructure to effectively move timber up the Yangtze River. In time, this led to a period of commercial prosperity for the town and region. The Huizhou Hall was built, and it became the site of the town's annual Grand Lantern event. Huizhou wood was shipped from Nanjing to places like Jiangxi, Hunan, and Hubei. The lively and prosperous port became the subject of scholarly and literary works. Shangxinhe novelist Ming Feng Meng was a successful Ming Dynasty novelist, with a widespread reputation for his foreboding stories.

=== Qing dynasty ===
The Shangxinhe timber trade reached its economic peak during the Qing dynasty. Markets for Qing Imperial wood had opened up in distant towns and cities along the Yangtze River, which were using it for myriad uses, e.g. construction and making furniture. Merchants operated and shipped lumber from Hunan, Dongting, and Poyang Lake. Shangxinhe wood suppliers had lucrative sales of Huizhou timber to Hubei, Hunan, Sichuan, and other places. Fir and bamboo from Nanjing were also shipped. In White Next Suo Yan, In reference to Shangxinhe, Gan Hee (born 1798) described the town's annual grand lantern event, where the lanterns' lights glowed off of the Huizhou wood. It was described as a scene of "peace and prosperity". In the late Qing dynasty, up to 32 timber suppliers were shipping to Jiangxi, Hubei, Hunan, and Sichuan. As business expanded, Shangxinhe markets expanded into northern Jiangsu and Zhejiang. When the railroad was introduced, it became a more convenient means of transportation, leading to a gradual decline in the Shangxinhe economy.
