= Olympic Stadium East station =

Nanjing Metro station

Coordinates: 32.0049°N 118.7290°E

Olympic Stadium East 奥体东
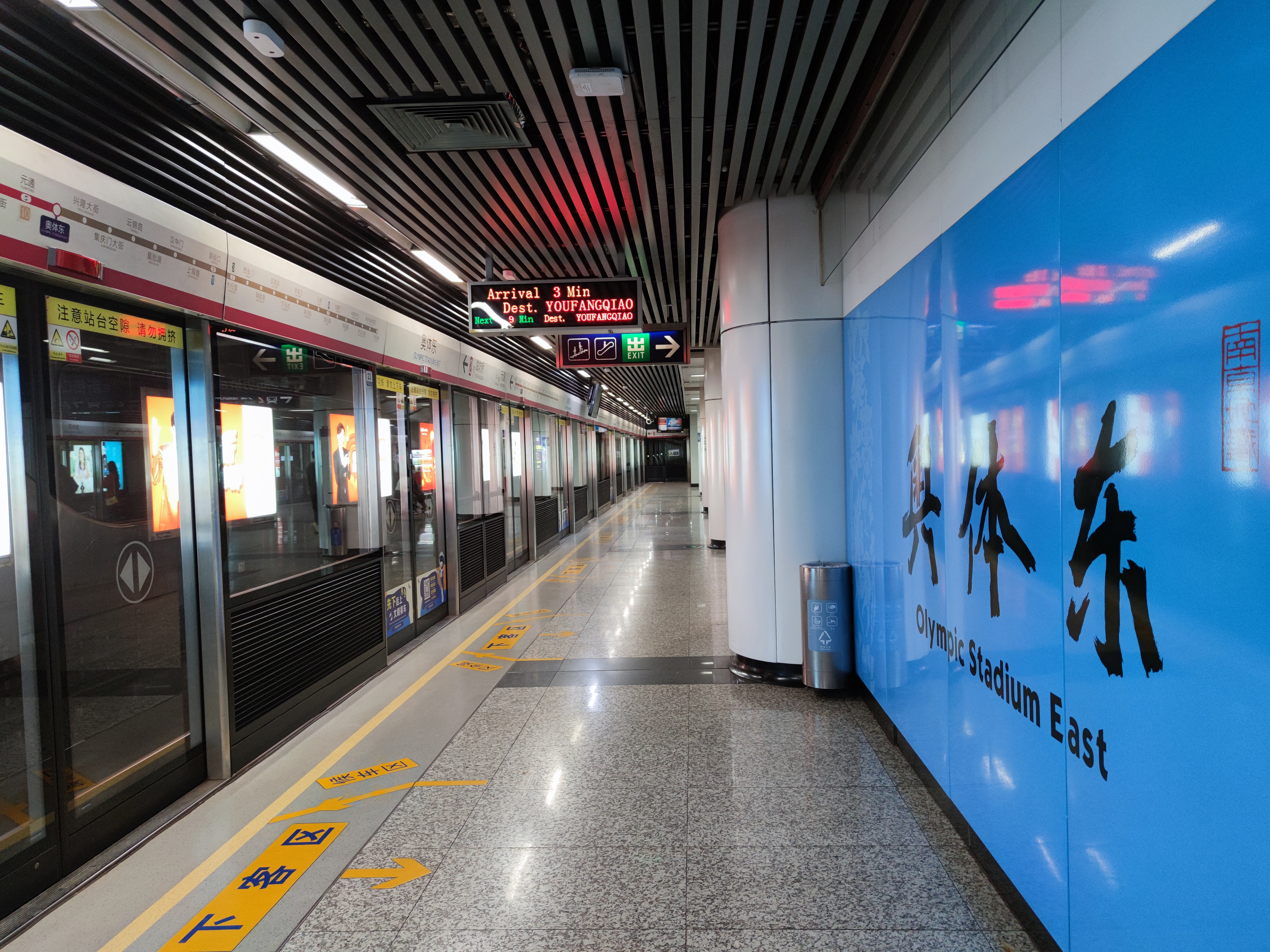
- The platform at Olympic Stadium East in March 2021

General information
- Location: Middle Jiangdong Road (江东中路); Jianye District, Nanjing, Jiangsu; China
- Operated by: Nanjing Metro Co. Ltd.
- Line(s): Line 2

Construction
- Structure type: Underground

Other information
- Station code: 208

History
- Opened: 28 May 2010

Services
Preceding station	Nanjing Metro	Following station
Yuantong towards Yuzui	Line 2	Xinglongdajie towards Jingtianlu

Olympic Stadium East station (simplified Chinese: 奥体东站; traditional Chinese: 奧體東站; pinyin: Àotǐ Dōng Zhàn), formerly Xiangxinglu station (向兴路站; 向興路站; Xiàngxīnglù Zhàn) during planning until 2007, is a station of Line 2 of the Nanjing Metro. It started operations on 28 May 2010 along with the rest of Line 2. On 30 September 2016 the station served a peak volume of 31,300 passengers.

== Around the station ==
- Jinling Library
