= Xiaguan, Nanjing =

Former district of Nanjing, China

Coordinates: 32.0925°N 118.707°E

Xiaguan 下关区
- District of the People's Republic of China
- 1955–2013
- History
  - Established: 1955
  - Disestablished: 2013
Succeeded by
Gulou District, Nanjing
- Today part of: Part of the Gulou District, Nanjing

Xiaguan District was an administrative district within the city of Nanjing, in Jiangsu province, China.

== See also ==
- Zhongshan Wharf
