= Jiqingmendajie station =

Nanjing Metro station

Coordinates: 32°01′44″N 118°44′22″E

Jiqingmendajie 集庆门大街
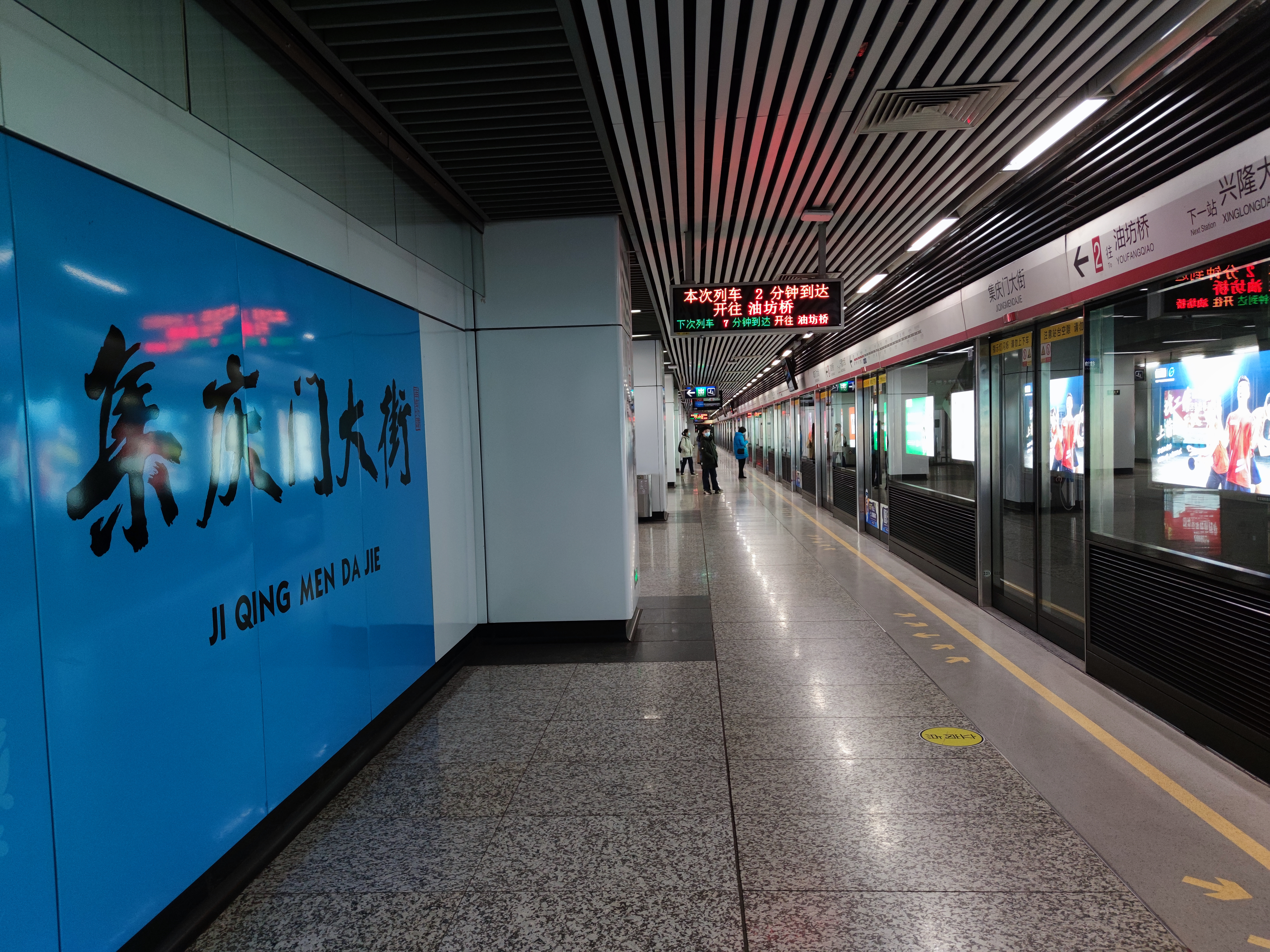

General information
- Location: Middle Jiangdong Road (江东中路) and Jiqingmen Street; Jianye District, Nanjing, Jiangsu; China
- Operated by: Nanjing Metro Co. Ltd.
- Line(s): Line 2
- Platforms: 4 (2 island platforms)

Construction
- Structure type: Underground

Other information
- Station code: 210

History
- Opened: 28 May 2010

Services
Preceding station	Nanjing Metro	Following station
Xinglongdajie towards Yuzui	Line 2	Yunjinlu towards Jingtianlu

Jiqingmendajie station (simplified Chinese: 集庆门大街站; traditional Chinese: 集慶門大街站; pinyin: Jíqìngméndàjiē Zhàn; lit. 'Jiqingmen Street station') is a station of Line 2 of the Nanjing Metro. It started operations on 28 May 2010 along with the rest of Line 2. The theme of this station's decoration is Mid-Autumn Festival.

== Station structure ==
The station was planned to be an interchange station between Line 2 and Line 6. Line 2 was designed to use the inner tracks and go beneath Yangtze River, while Line 6 was expected to use the outer tracks. But an accident happened under further construction, Line 6 was replanned and it no longer need to go through this station, and Line 2 used the track reserved to Line 6. In this way, the middle three tracks turned into stabling tracks.

Also, due to the configuration of the tracks, the platform opposite the direction of Yuzui station used a wall instead of a platform screen door, and the platform opposite the direction of Jintianlu station got a platform screen door a bit north than that in Jintianlu station. This platform was used in May 2021 due to the construction of West Extension of Line 2.

When approaching or leaving the northern part of the station, trains have to move slower due to lots of switches in the rail.

B1; Concourse	Exits, Customer service, Vending machines
B2; Platforms	Line 2 to Yuzui (Xinglongdajie)
B2; Platforms	Island platform
B2; Platforms	No regular service
B2; Platforms	No regular service
B2; Platforms	No regular service
B2; Platforms	Island platform
B2; Platforms	Line 2 to Jingtianlu (Yunjinlu)
