= Xinglongdajie station =

Nanjing Metro station

Coordinates: 32°00′55″N 118°44′09″E

Xinglongdajie 兴隆大街
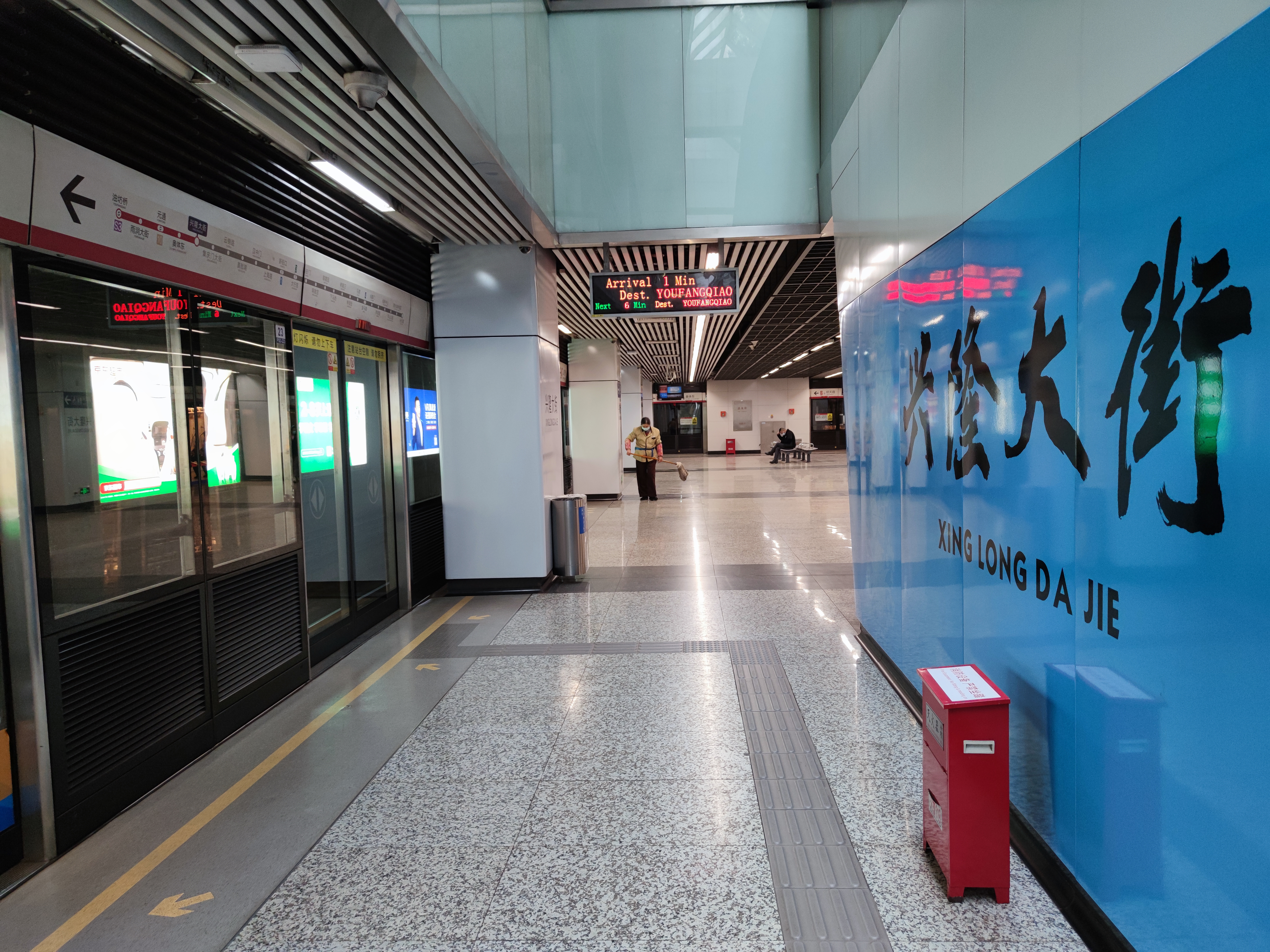

Chinese name
- Simplified Chinese: 兴隆大街站
- Traditional Chinese: 興隆大街站
- Literal meaning: Xinglong Street station
Transcriptions
Standard Mandarin
- Hanyu Pinyin: Xīnglóngdàjiē Zhàn

General information
- Location: Middle Jiangdong Road (江东中路) and Xinglong Street; Jianye District, Nanjing, Jiangsu; China
- Operated by: Nanjing Metro Co. Ltd.
- Line(s): Line 2

Construction
- Structure type: Underground

Other information
- Station code: 209

History
- Opened: 28 May 2010

Services
Preceding station	Nanjing Metro	Following station
Olympic Stadium East towards Yuzui	Line 2	Jiqingmendajie towards Jingtianlu

Xinglongdajie station (Chinese: 兴隆大街站), formerly known as Suojie station (Chinese: 所街站; pinyin: Suǒjiē Zhàn) during planning until 2007, is a station of Line 2 of the Nanjing Metro. It started operations on 28 May 2010 along with the rest of Line 2. The theme of this station's decorations is National Day.
