= Wang Hanzhou residence =

Coordinates: 32.02643°N 118.72164°E

The Wang Hanzhou residence (Chinese: 王汉洲故居; pinyin: Wáng Hànzhōu Gùjū), built in the late Qing dynasty, is located at 83, Hebei Avenue in the New River area. The wood building is in the traditional Chinese courtyard style (四合院; sìhéyuàn) and open on three sides. Built of brick with dimensions of 42 by 12 metres (138 by 39 ft), the structure has a courtyard, atrium, and dwelling rooms. Ornate, high relief wood carvings were made in the doors and beams of the house in the designs of birds, figures, and flowers. A half-moon shaped hall is situated on the top floor of the three stories. The residence has views of the pier and the New River. It is considered a masterpiece of residential architecture in Nanjing.

Despite the building's status as protected, as of 2014 its future remains uncertain.

== Wang Hangzhou ==
Wang Hanzhou (Chinese: 王汉洲; 1874–1967) was a major Chinese timber merchant during the Qing dynasty and also a shēnshì (绅士) or "enlightened gentleman", a social rank that carried part-time government responsibilities. During the Ming and Qing dynasties, the New River area (新河地区; Xīnhé dìqū) in the Jianye District of Nanjing, became an important centre for the timber trade with goods imported via the adjacent Yangtze River to feed the growing demand for the commodity in the nearby provinces of Jiangsu and Zhejiang. Wang was one of the merchants from Huizhou in Anhui Province who built their residences in the heart of the New River area to service this trade. Outside of the timber trade, Wang was also well known locally for his bold yet unaffected calligraphy.
