= Mochouhu station =

Nanjing Metro station

Coordinates: 32°02′14″N 118°45′32″E

Mochouhu 莫愁湖
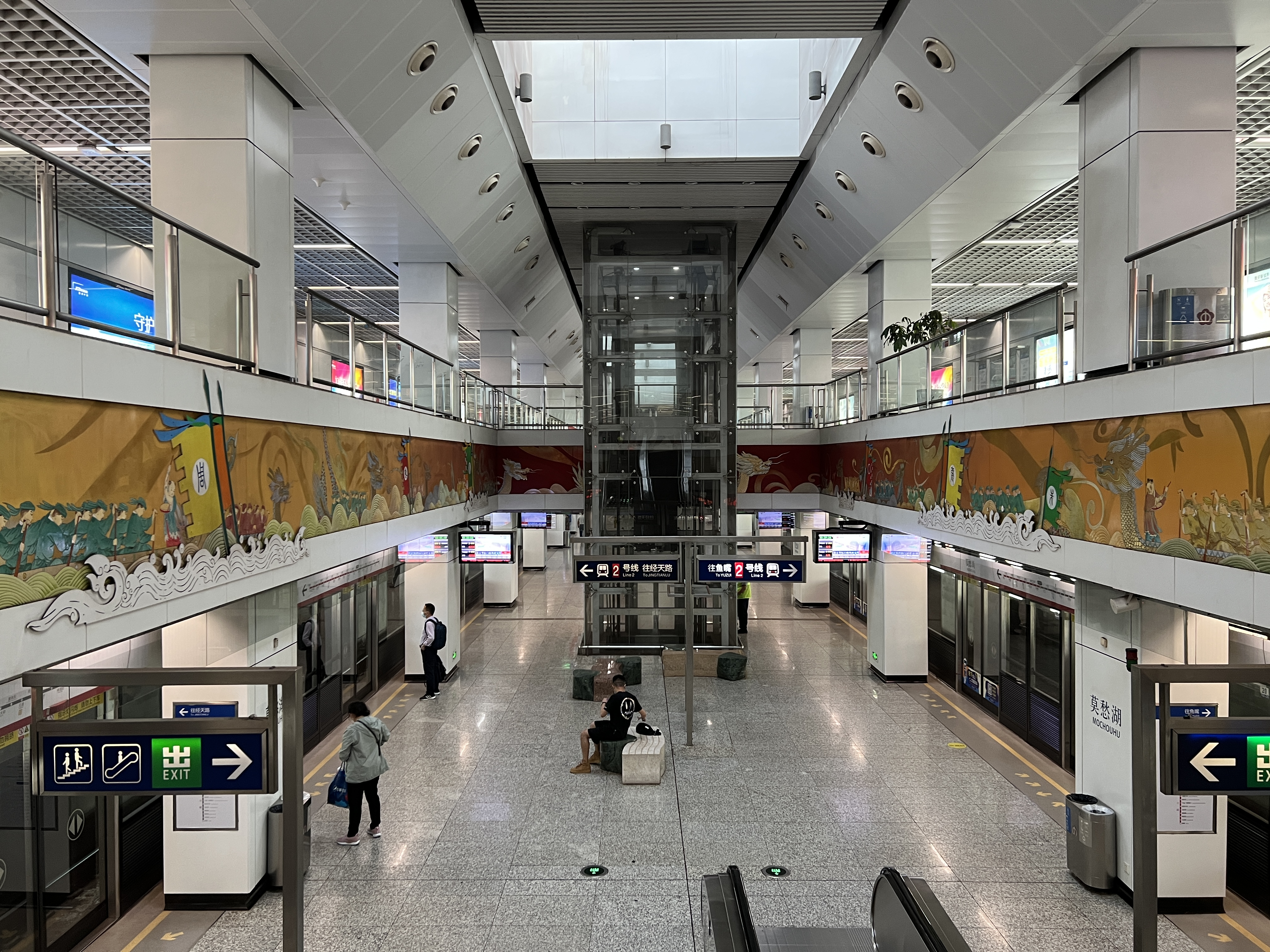
- Line 2 platform

General information
- Location: West Mochouhu Road (莫愁湖西路) and Hanzhongmen Street (汉中门大街); Jianye District, Nanjing, Jiangsu; China
- Operated by: Nanjing Metro Co. Ltd.
- Lines: Line 2 Line 7

Construction
- Structure type: Underground

Other information
- Station code: 212

History
- Opened: 28 May 2010 (Line 2); 28 December 2024 (Line 7)

Services
Preceding station	Nanjing Metro	Following station
Yunjinlu towards Yuzui	Line 2	Hanzhongmen towards Jingtianlu
Qingliangshan towards Xianxinlu	Line 7	Dashichating towards Xishanqiao
Location

Mochouhu station (Chinese: 莫愁湖站; pinyin: Mòchóuhú Zhàn) is a station of Line 2 and Line 7 of the Nanjing Metro. It started operations on 28 May 2010 for Line 2 and 28 December 2024 for Line 7. The theme of this station's decorations is Dragon Boat Festival.
