= Memorial Hall of the Victims in Nanjing Massacre by Japanese Invaders =

Memorial in Nanjing, China

Coordinates: 32°2′7.90″N 118°44′36.67″E

- 侵华日军南京大屠杀遇难同胞纪念馆
- Established: 15 August 1985
- Location: Jianye District, Nanjing, Jiangsu, China
- Type: History museum, war memorial
- Founder: Nanjing Municipal Government
- Architect: Qi Kang
- Website: www.19371213.com.cn/en/

Chinese name
- Simplified Chinese: 侵华日军南京大屠杀遇难同胞纪念馆
- Traditional Chinese: 侵華日軍南京大屠殺遇難同胞紀念館
Transcriptions
Standard Mandarin
- Hanyu Pinyin: Qīnhuá Rìjūn Nánjīng Dàtúshā Yùnàn Tóngbāo Jìniànguǎn

Map

The Memorial Hall of the Victims in Nanjing Massacre by Japanese Invaders is a museum to memorialize those that were killed in the Nanjing Massacre by the Imperial Japanese Army in and around the then-capital of China, Nanjing, after it fell on 13 December 1937. It is located in the southwestern corner of downtown Nanjing known as Jiangdongmen (江东门), near a site where thousands of bodies were buried, called the "pit of ten thousand people" (simplified Chinese: 万人坑; traditional Chinese: 萬人坑; pinyin: wàn rén kēng).

== Nanjing Massacre ==
On 13 December 1937, the Imperial Japanese Army occupied Nanjing (formerly Nanking), then the capital city of the Republic of China. During the first six to eight weeks of their occupation, the Japanese Army committed numerous atrocities and war crimes, including rape, arson, looting, torture, and mass executions of both soldiers and civilians. China estimates that approximately three hundred thousand civilians and unarmed soldiers were brutally slaughtered. This estimate was made from burial records and eyewitness accounts by the Nanjing War Crimes Tribunal and included in the verdict for Hisao Tani. Corpses littered the streets and were seen afloat in the Qinhuai River and Yangtze River for weeks. Countless shops, stores, and residences were looted and sacked, and many structures in the city were burned down..

Japanese soldiers were also reported to have conducted killing competitions and bayonet practice using Chinese prisoners. Approximately twenty thousand cases of rape occurred within the city during the first month of the occupation, according to the "Judgement of the International Military Tribunal". Even children, the elderly, and nuns are reported to have suffered at the hands of the Japanese Army.

== Memorial Hall ==
The Nanjing Memorial Hall was built in 1985 by the Nanjing Municipal Government in memory of the three hundred thousand victims of the massacre. In 1995, it was enlarged and renovated. The memorial exhibits historical records and objects, and uses architecture, sculptures, and videos to illustrate what happened during the Nanjing Massacre. Many historical items were donated by Japanese members of a Japanese–Chinese friendship group, which also donated a garden located on the museum grounds.

It occupies a total area of approximately twenty-eight thousand square meters, including about three thousand square meters of building floor space.

The memorial consists of three major parts: outdoor exhibits, sheltered skeletal remains of victims, and an exhibition hall of historical documents.

Admission is free but require prior registration. Visitors should prepare themselves for large crowds of people at all times of day.

=== Outdoor exhibits ===
The outdoor exhibit include statues, sculptures, relief carvings, tablets, and a large wall listing the names of victims, as well as an atonement tablet and memorial walkway. The memorial walkway displays footprints of survivors, some of which were impressed as recently as 2002.

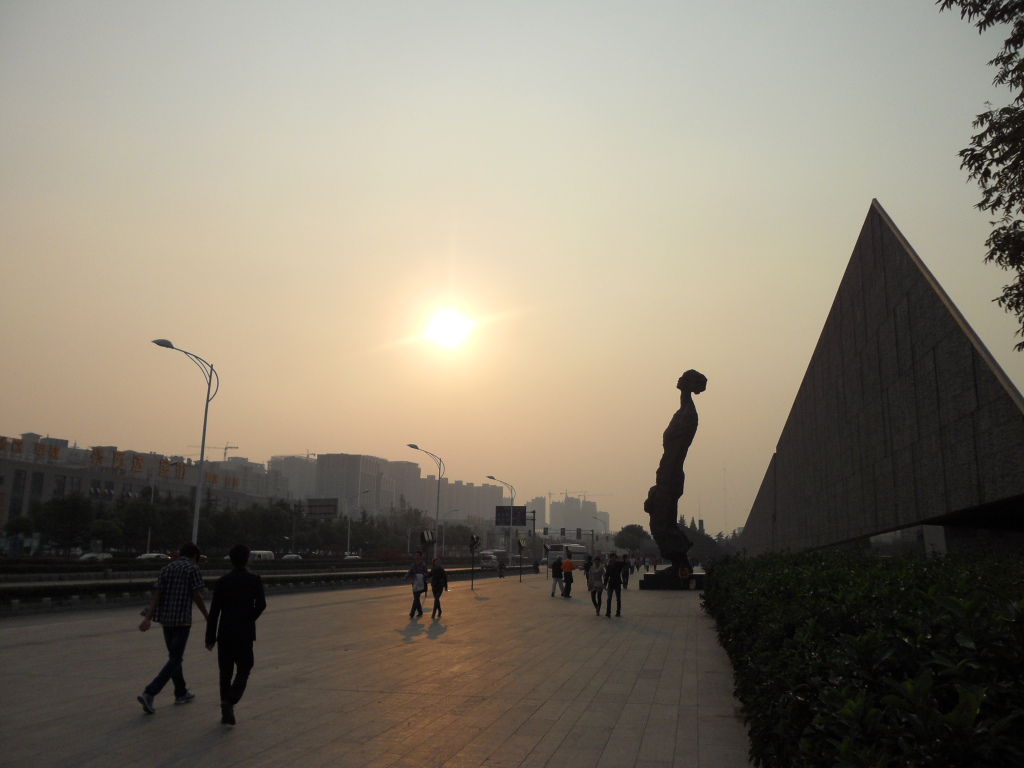
Street view of the Memorial Hall

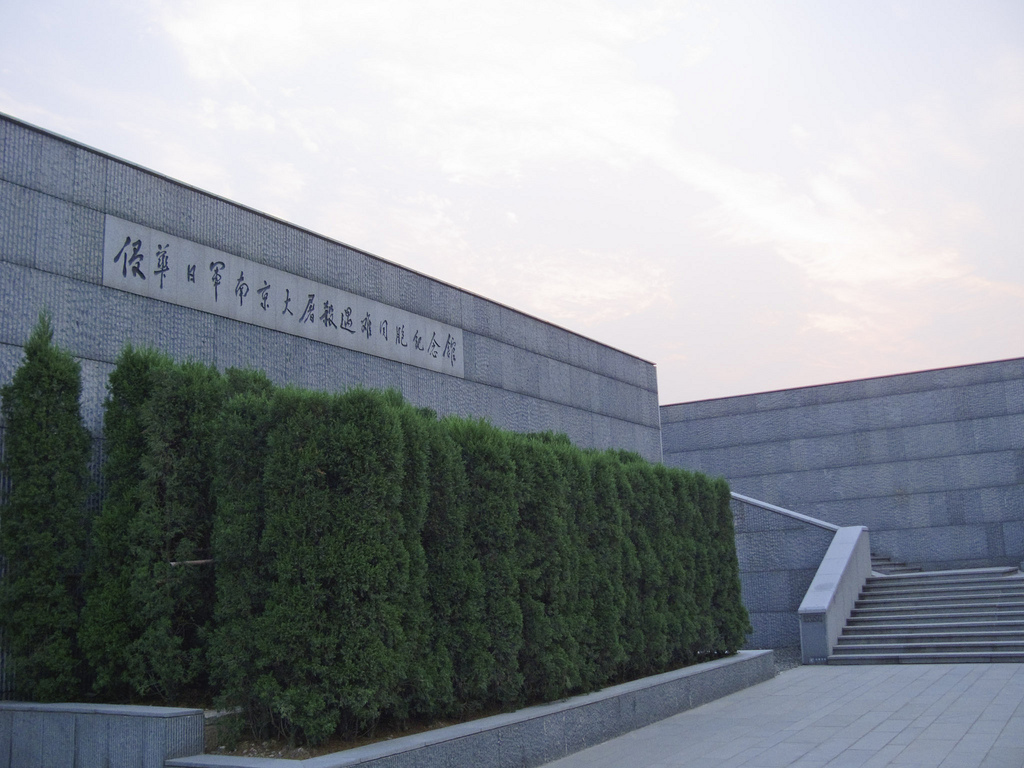
Entrance of the Memorial Hall, with the official name of the hall written in Traditional Chinese calligraphy by Deng Xiaoping.

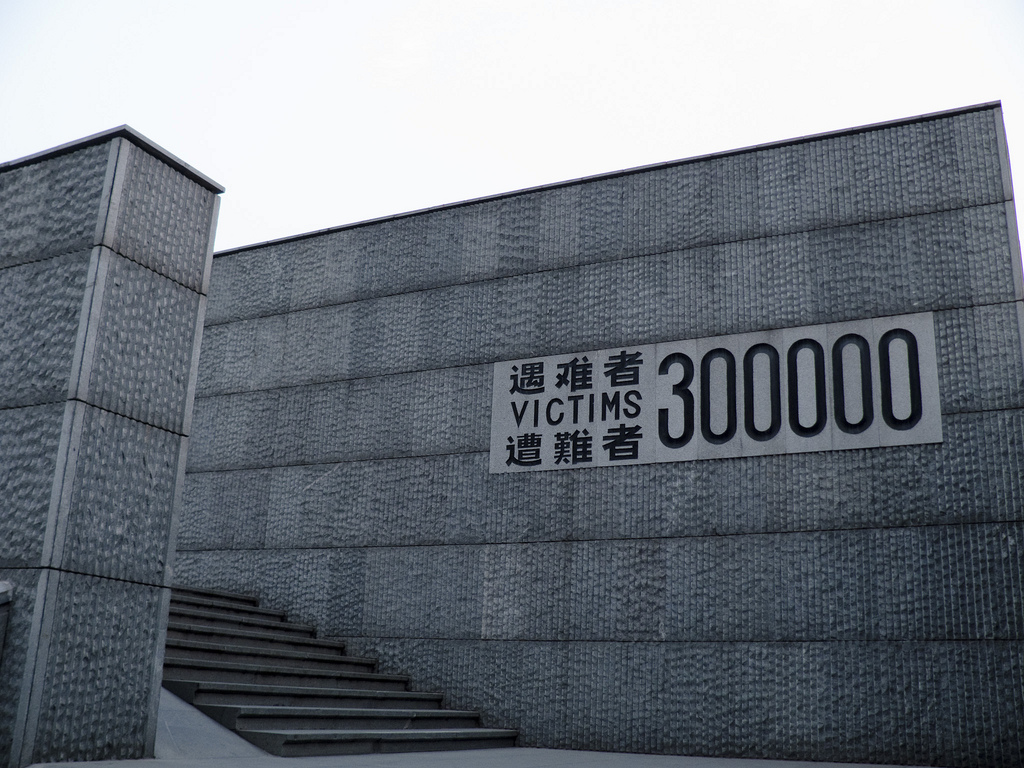
A wall at the entrance of the Memorial Hall, with the words "Victims 300,000" carved in stone

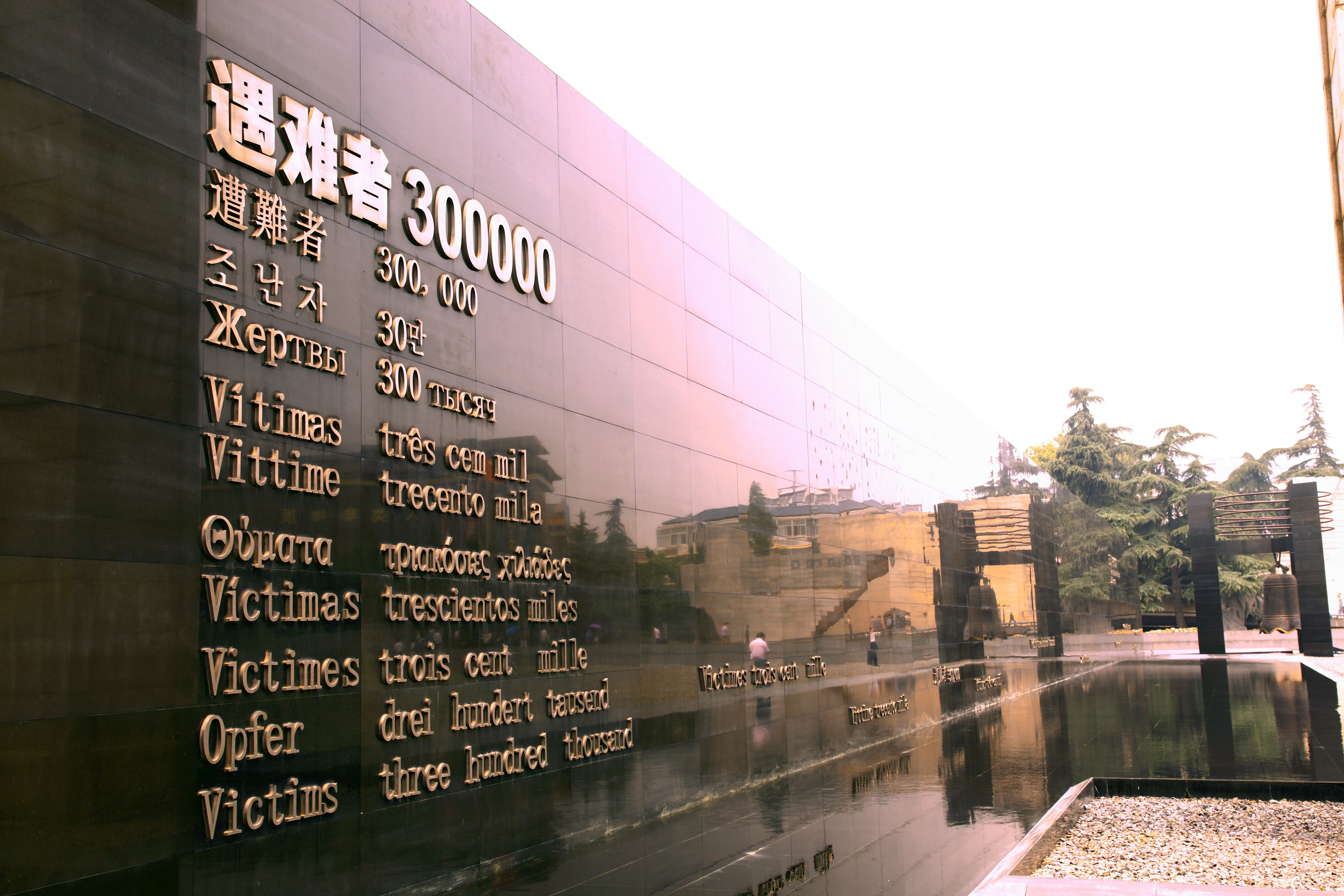
A memorial wall dedicated to 300,000 victims of the Nanjing Massacre

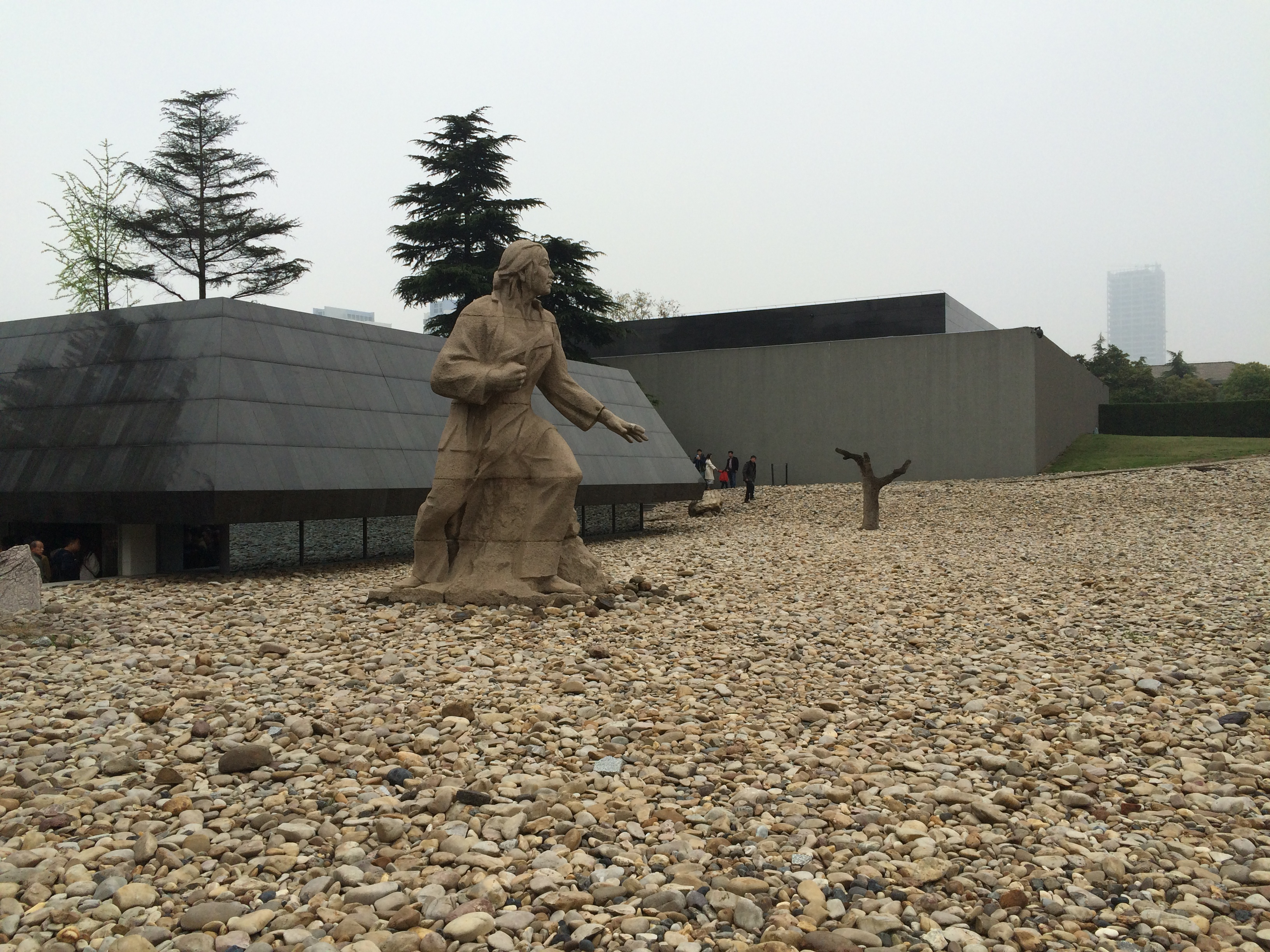

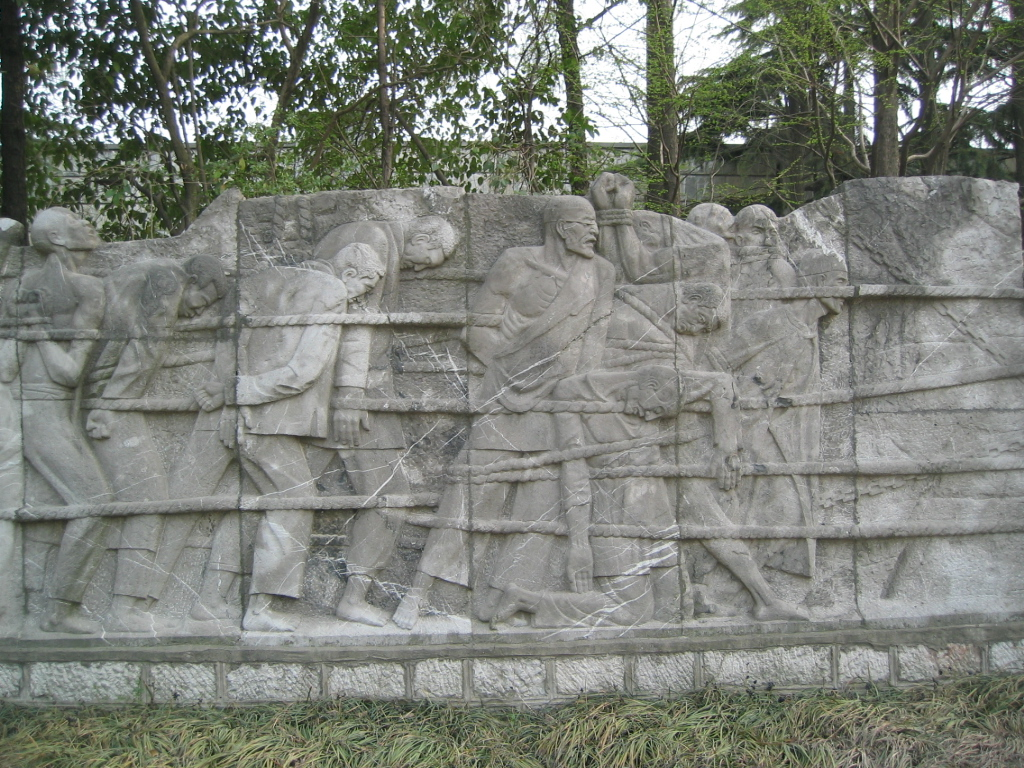
A stone relief at the Memorial Hall

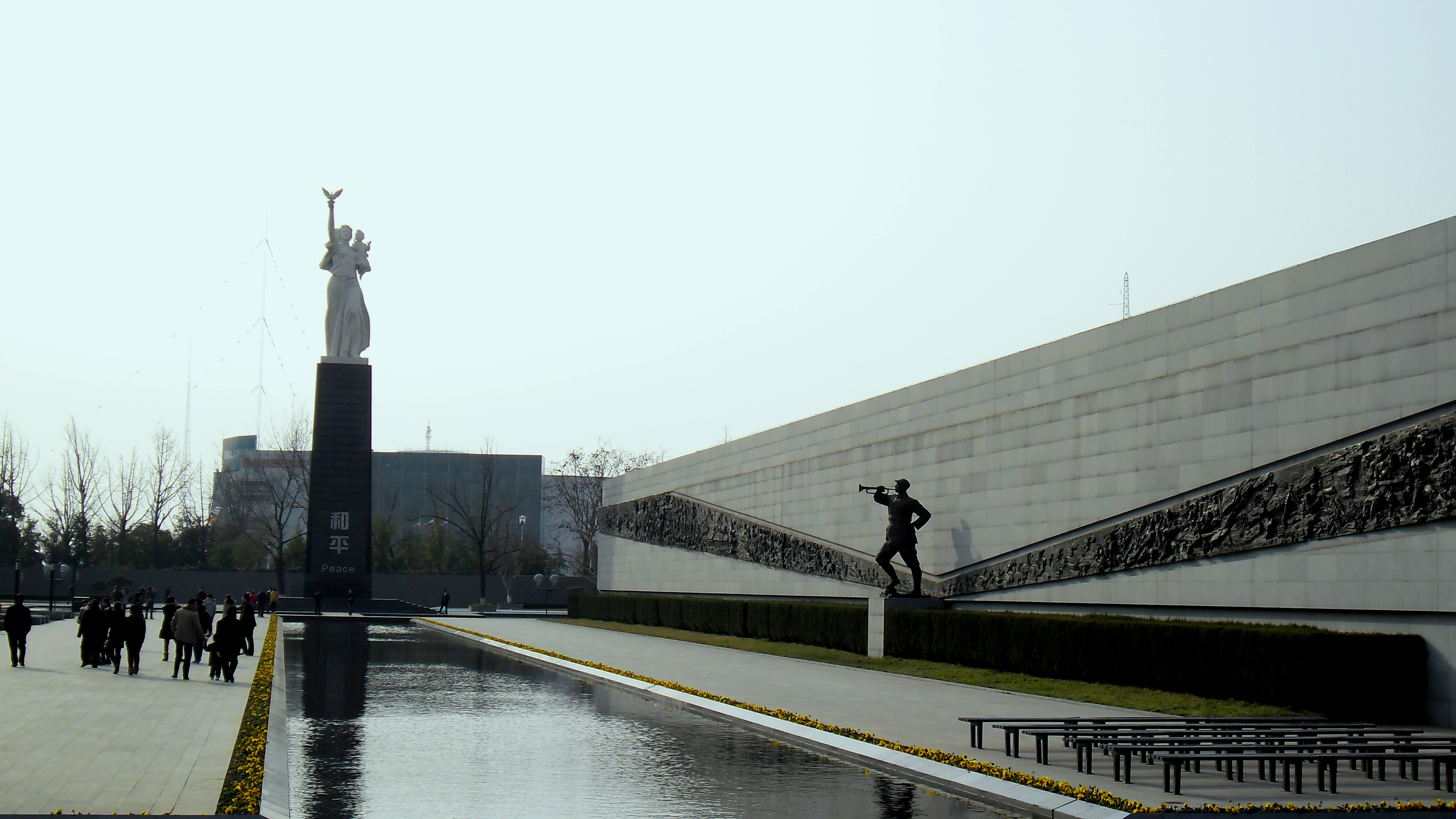
The main plaza of the Memorial Hall

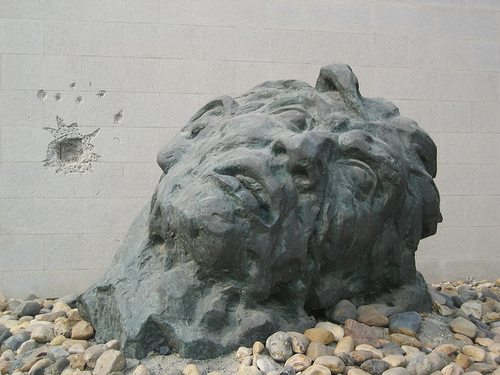
Statue of a victim being buried alive

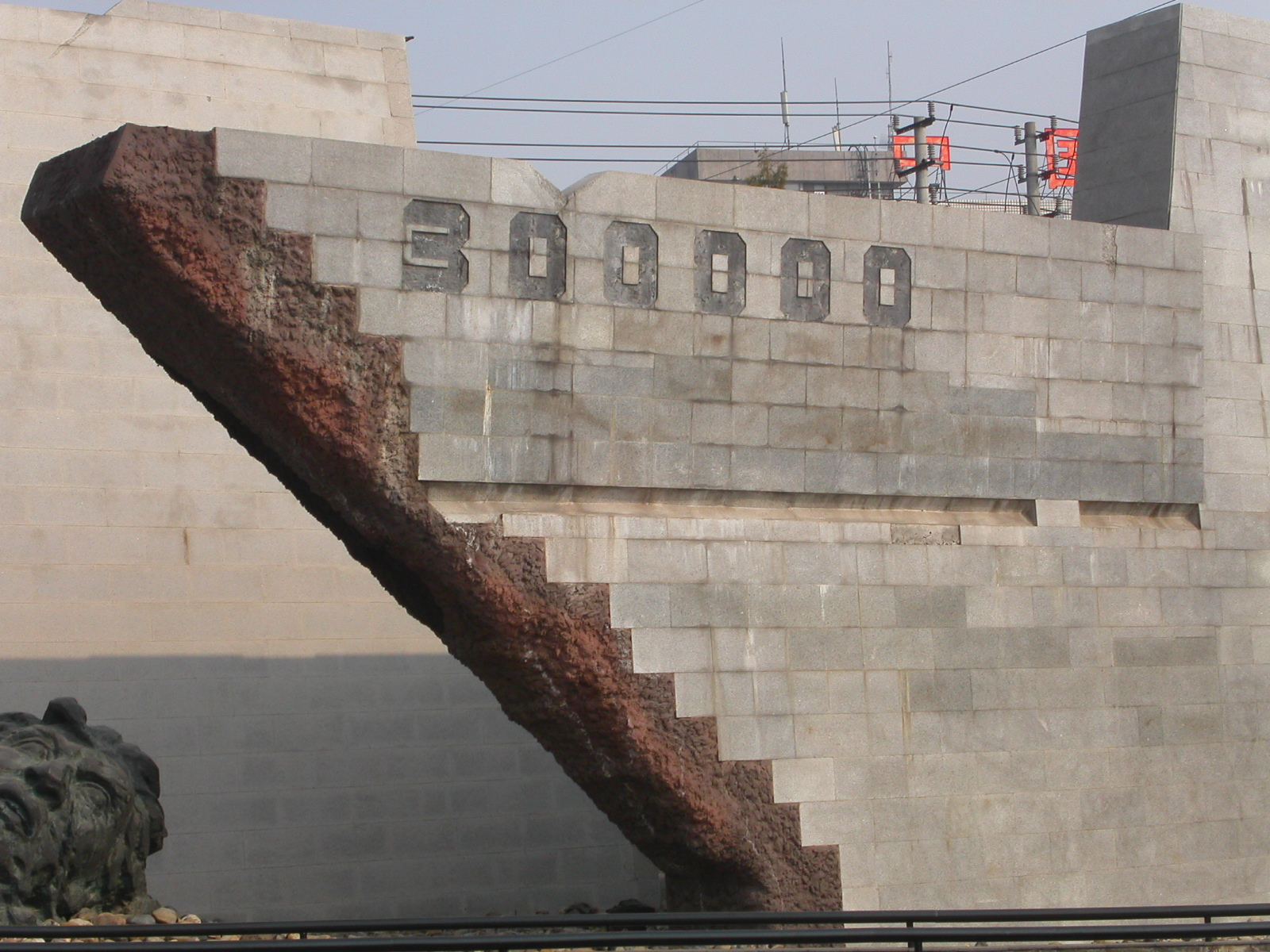

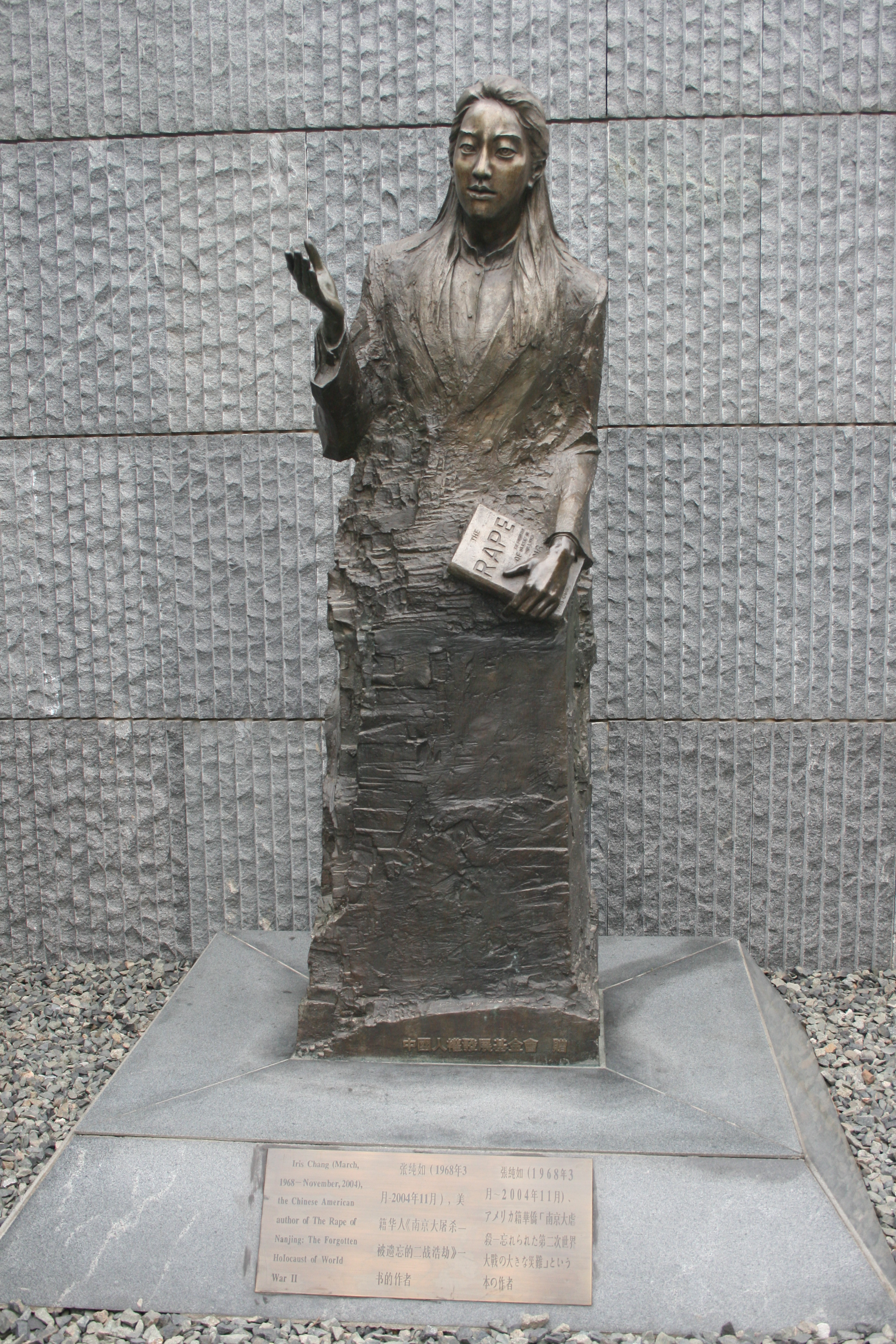
Statue of Iris Chang, author of The Rape of Nanjing The Forgotten Holocaust of World War II

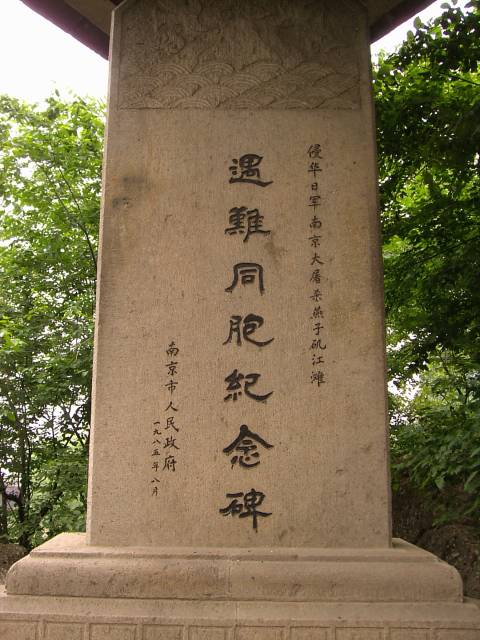
Yanziji Nanjing Massacre Memorial in 2004

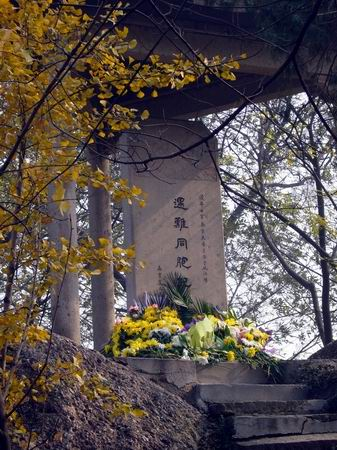

=== Skeletal remains ===
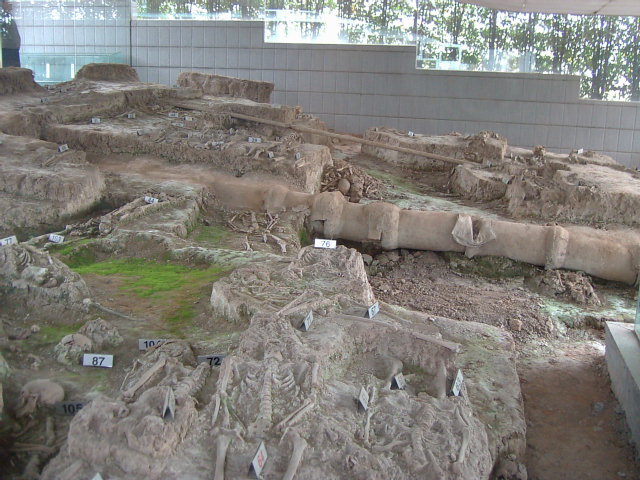
Skeletal remains

The skeletal remains of massacre victims, now exhibited in a coffin-shaped display hall, were excavated from Jiangdongmen in 1985; 208 more were uncovered in 1998.

=== Exhibition hall ===
The tomb-like exhibition hall, half underground, contains more than 1000 items related to the massacre, including an immense collection of pictures, objects, charts, and photographs. Paintings, sculptures, illuminated display cabinets, multimedia screens and documentary films serve to demonstrate to visitors the crimes committed by the Japanese military. The hall also houses statues of several foreign nationals who helped establish the Nanking Safety Zone, including the chief organizer German businessman John Rabe, and American missionaries Minnie Vautrin and John Magee.

== Nanjing Massacre History and International Peace Research Institute ==
This research institute was established at the memorial hall by the Jiangsu Provincial Government on 1 March 2016. The superintendent is Xian Wen Zhang, professor of the School of History, Nanjing University. The executive president is Jian Jun Zhang, curator of the memorial hall. It consists of Nanjing Massacre History Research Center, Anti-Japanese War History Research Center, Comfort Women Research Center, Contemporary Japanese Politics Research Center, Peace Studies Research Center, International Peace School and other institutions.

== Transportation ==
The memorial hall is accessible within walking distance west of Yunjinlu Station on Line 2 of the Nanjing Metro. The entrance to the Memorial Hall is across the street from Exit 2 of the station.

== See also ==
- Nanjing Massacre Memorial Day
