= Zhongshan Wharf =

Coordinates: 32.08773°N 118.73361°E

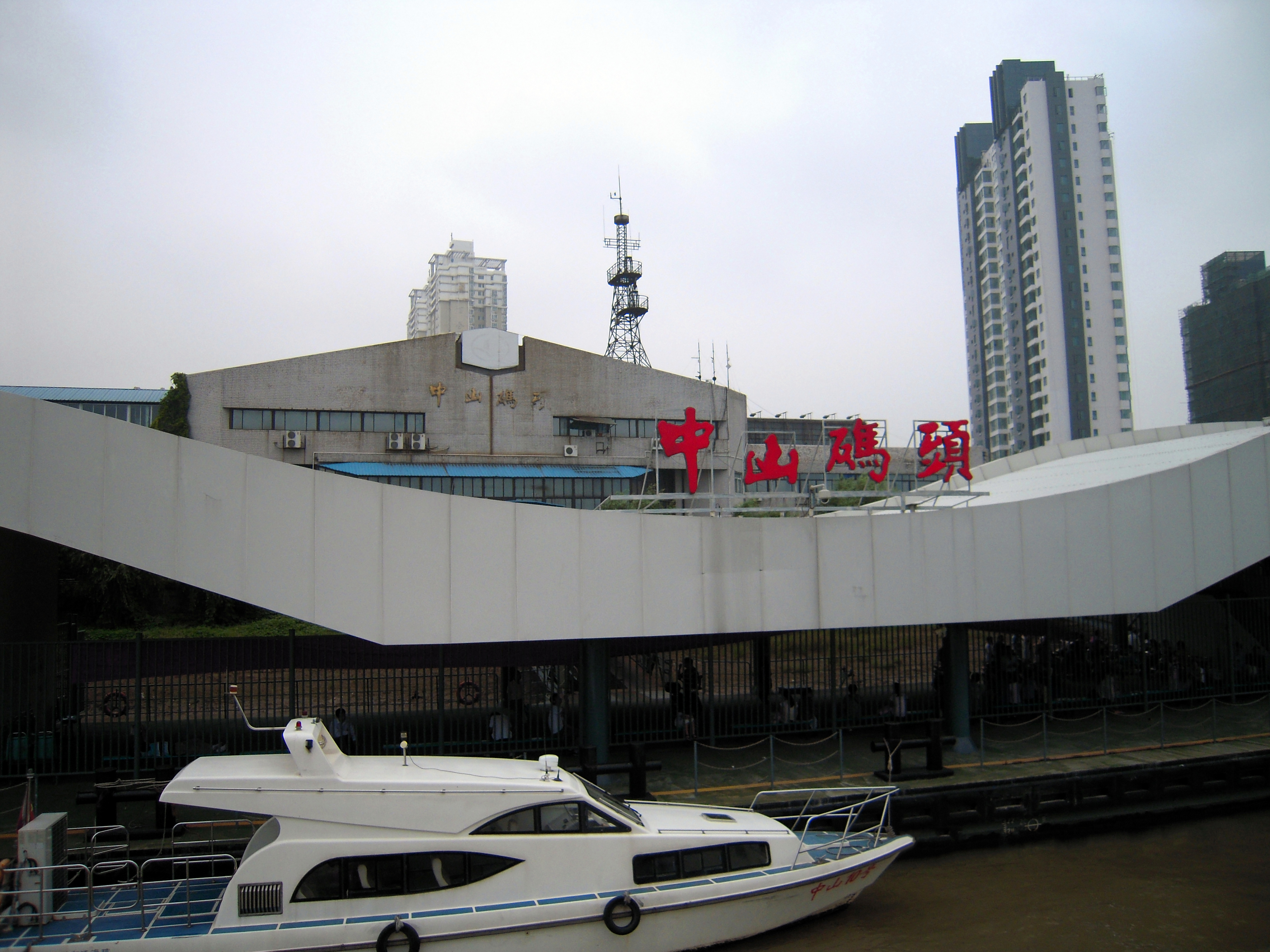
The view of Zhongshan Wharf from ferry

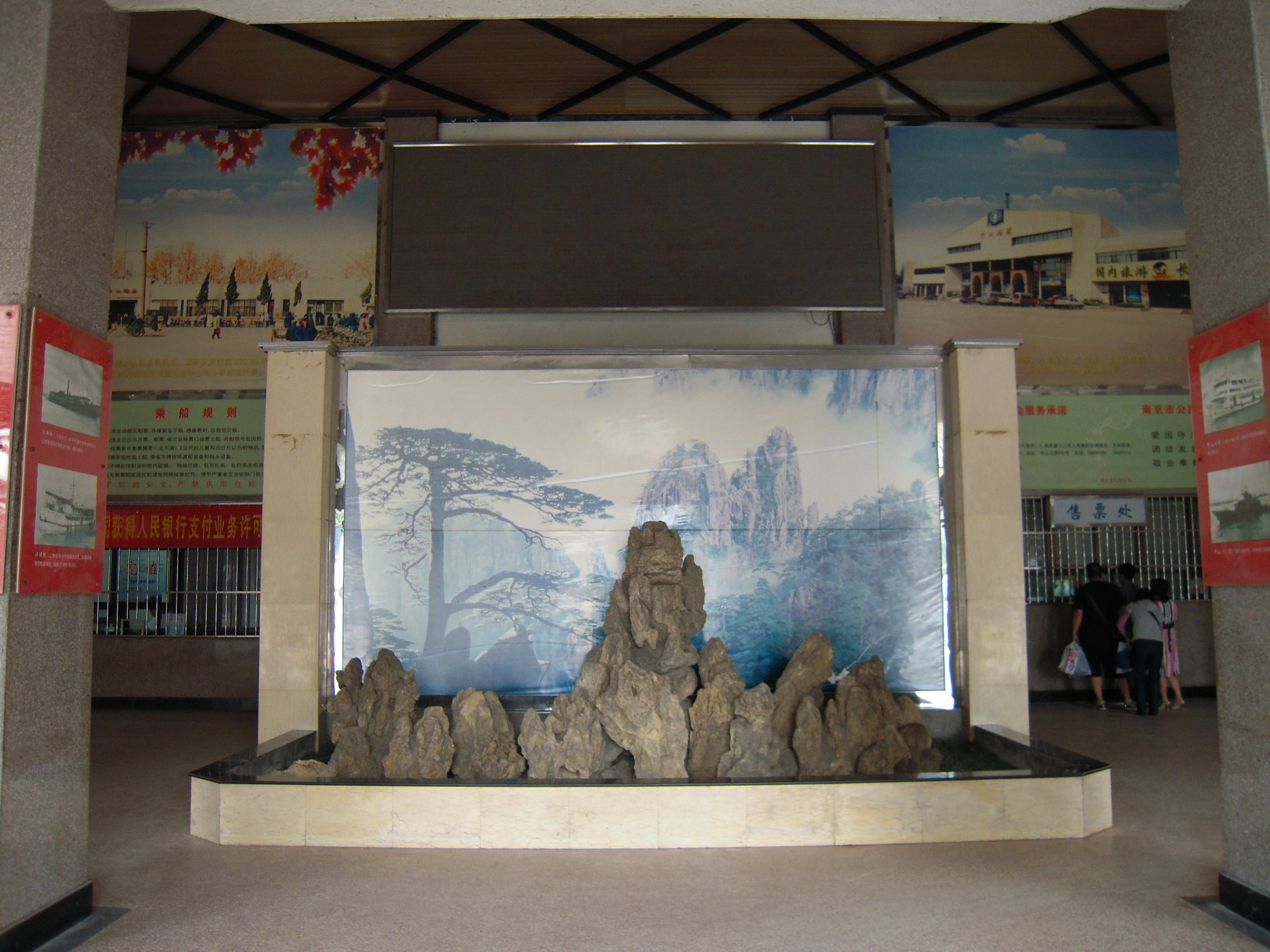
The hall of Zhongshan Wharf

Zhongshan Wharf (Chinese: 中山码头), located along Yangtze River, is a wharf in Xiaguan. It is near wharf No.7 of Port of Nanjing.

== Background ==
In 1899, Nanjing became a treaty port. Foreign ship companies began to build wharfs in Xiaguan, including British company Jardine Matheson (1900), Japanese Swire (1901), Japanese Osaka (1902).

In 1908, Jinpu Railway was under construction. In 1910, Jinpu began to construct wharfs along the Pukou river, completing 10 wharfs for passenger and freight transport by 1914. Many wharfs were built along Xiaguan River, including one for passenger ferry and one for train ferry.

Zhongshan Wharf changed from passenger transport called Dasheng Wharf (大生码头), which was located near Jinling Guan (金陵关). In October 1914, the Jinpu port authorities rented West Fort Battery (西炮台) from Xiaguan commercial port authorities. The wharf was moved to Nanjing and named after Feihong Ferry (飞鸿号). In 1921, Feihong sank and was replaced by Chengping Ferry (澄平号). In 1928, Jinpu began to build a new wharf at the beginning of Zhongshan Road. On 28 March 1935, the project was accomplished. In 1936, it came to use, and was renamed Zhongshan Wharf.

== Development ==
After the People's Republic of China was founded, the waiting hall of Zhongshan Wharf was expanded, from 370.59 square meters to 775.2 square meters. In 1990, it was rebuilt again, reaching an area of 3,040 square metres (32,700 sq ft).
