= Smart grid in China =

China is the world's largest consumer of electricity, and its demand is expected to reach nearly 13,000 TWh by 2030. In 2010, 70 percent of the country's electricity generation came from coal-fired power plants, but the Chinese government is investing heavily in renewable energy technologies. As of 2024, renewable energy capacity officially surpassed coal-fired capacity, making up over 50% of China's installed total power capacity. This represents only 9 percent of overall primary energy consumption in the country. China's latest goal is to increase renewable energy to 9.5 percent of overall primary energy use by 2015. To implement China's new clean energy capacity into the national power grid, and to improve the reliability of the country's existing infrastructure, requires significant upgrades and ultimately, a smart grid. According to the U.S. Energy Information Administration, despite China’s rapid growth in renewable energy, fossil fuels such as coal still account for the majority of electricity generation as of 2025.

Electricity production in China till 2005

A smart grid differs from a conventional power grid in that it includes a system of information and communication technologies to bidirectionally transmit and distribute electricity more efficiently and reliably. Additionally, this technology allows consumers to manage their power usage and make choices for economically efficient products and services. China's national utility, the State Grid Corporation of China (SGCC), is responsible for the oversight of these upgrades.

== History ==
China's national utility, the State Grid Corporation of China (SGCC), has announced plans to invest $250 billion in electric power infrastructure upgrades over the next five years, of which $45 billion is earmarked for smart grid technologies. Another $240 billion between 2016 and 2020 will be added to complete the smart grid project.

=== 5-year plan ===
==== 2009–2010 –Phase 1 – Planning and Pilot Projects Phase ====
• Set technical and management standards

• Develop technology and equipment

• Set development plans and initiate pilot projects

• Specifically, in 2010, China has planned

to start construction on the "Two Vertical, Two Horizontal" plan and reach interregional transmission capability of 12.9 GW by the end of the year.

==== 2011–2015– Phase 2 – Comprehensive Construction Phase ====
• Construct UHV grid and urban-rural distribution grid

• Construct smart grid operation/control and interactive service system

• Key technological breakthroughs and their applications

• By 2015, UHV and other intra-regional transmission capacity will be 240 GW. Distribution and power provision will reach a reliability rate of 99.915% or higher in the cities and 99.73% or higher in rural areas. Smart meters will be in widespread use and EV charging stations will have been deployed in numbers that will satisfy demand

==== 2016–2020– Phase 3 – Leadership Phase ====
• Complete a strong, smart grid

• Establish the country as a global leader in management systems, technological development and the provision of modern equipment

• By 2020, UHV and other intra-regional transmission capacity will reach 400 GW, enough to connect all planned coal, hydro, nuclear and wind power to areas with high demand

== Technology ==
=== Smart meters ===
During 2011 SGCC took bids for 44 million smart meter units. In total, 65 companies received bids for smart meters from SGCC. The total smart meter market in China is estimated to be 330 million smart meter units worth approximately US$7.7 billion. By 2011, SGCC had deployed 45 million smart meter units. All SGCC users are expected to be equipped with smart meters by 2014.

==== Top 10 smart meter bid winners in the first four biddings of SGCC, 2011 ====
1. Jiangsu Linyang Electronics Co., Ltd 6.48%
2. Waision Group Holdings Limited 6.07%
3. Shenzhen Clou Electronics Co., Ltd. 5.95%
4. Nigbo Sanxing Electric Co., Ltd. 5.54%
5. Holley Metering Limited 4.14%
6. Ningxia LGG Instrument Co., Ltd. 3.89%
7. Hangzhou Hexing Electrical Co., Ltd. 3.85%
8. Shenzhen Haoningda Meters Co., Ltd. 3.70%
9. Shenzhen Kaifa Technology Co., Ltd. 3.63%
10. Shenzhen Techrise Electronics Co., Ltd. 3.12%

=== Battery energy storage station ===
In December 2011 construction on battery energy storage station residing in Zhangbei, Hebei Province was completed by BYD and SGCC. The storage station is capable of storing 36 MWh of energy in a series of lithium iron-phosphate batteries approximately the size of a football field. Designed to be implemented in conjunction with a 140 MW expansion of renewable energy (solar and wind), this project is worth over US$500 million.

=== Digital substations ===
The first digital substation was built in China in 2006. By 2009 China had implemented more than 70 digital substations. The implementation of digital substations is critical to the smart grid because of it allows for processing of energy generated from conventional and renewable sources, protects the grid from attack, and communicates with the rest of the grid.

=== Flexible power transmission ===
For flexible power transmission in the grid, substantial infrastructure upgrades must be made to the existing power grid. This is primarily being done by upgrading the existing power grid to a system capable of transmitting ultra high voltage AC and ultra high voltage DC power. Over half of China's investment in flexible power transmission is in the form of static VAR compensators or SVCs. In 2009, SGCC announced its plan to invest approximately 88 billion dollars in ultra high voltage equipment.

=== Electric vehicle charging equipment ===
In August 2009 SGCC established its first commercially available electric vehicle charging station, the Caoxi Electrical Vehicle Charging Station. As of 2010,

76 electric vehicle charging stations have been built in 41 Chinese cities. Continued investment in electric car infrastructure reflects the country's goal of having 500,000 electric, hybrid and fuel-cell vehicles on the road by 2015 and 5 million by 2020,.

Charging Stations by City as of 2010
City	Charging Stations	City	Charging Stations
Shanghai	6	Changchung	1
Beijing	5	Hangzhou	1
Tianjin	5	Suzhou	1
Jinan	5	Wuxi	1
Nanjing	5	Xiamen	1
Dalian	4	Changsha	1
Hefei	4	Zhengzhou	1
Xi'an	4	Guangzhou	1
Harbin	3	Chongqing	1
Chengdu	3	Kunming	1
Nanchang	2	Lanzhou	1
Wuhan	2	Taiyuan	1
Shenzhen	2	Yinchuan	1

== Deployments ==
In September 2011, SGCC announced plans to invest $250 billion in electric power infrastructure upgrades over the next five years, of which $45 billion is earmarked for smart grid technologies. Another $240 billion between 2016 and 2020 will be added to complete the smart grid project.

=== Pilot Programs ===
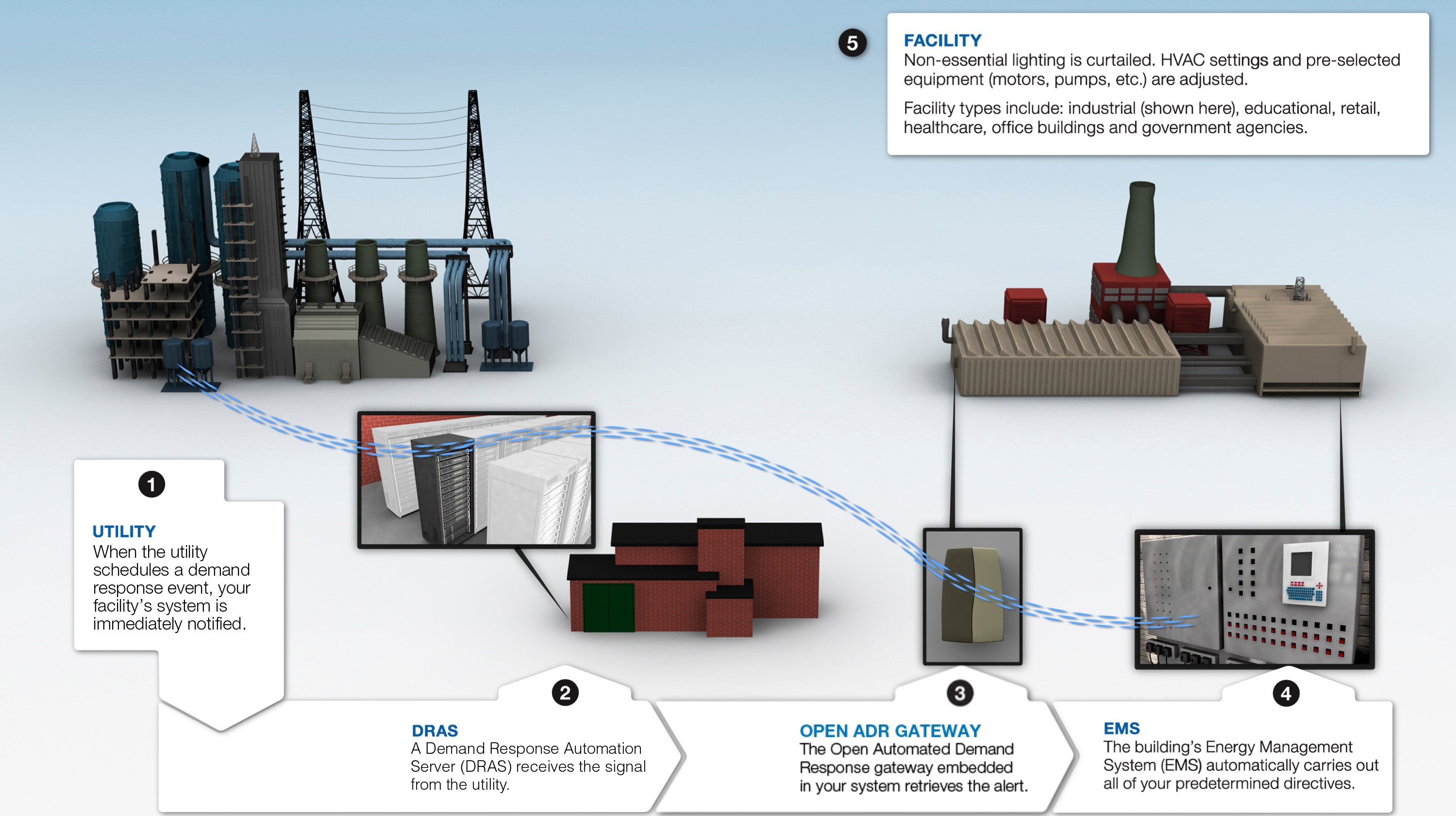
Automated Demand Response (ADR) Diagram

In 2012, China's Tianjin Economic-Technological Development Area (TEDA) signed an agreement with the U.S. Trade and Development Agency (USTDA) to deploy its first demand response pilot project. Honeywell was selected in 2011 to develop the smart grid project and implement its automated demand response (ADR) technology to temporarily decrease energy use in commercial and industrial facilities. The reduction is triggered when citywide consumption peaks and threatens to outpace the ability to produce power, which creates instability, and the potential for brownouts and blackouts. The project is part of a grant agreement between the State Grid Electric Power Research Institute (SGEPRI), a subsidiary of State Grid Corporation of China, and the USTDA.

Auto DR looks at energy use as a dynamic variable in balancing supply and demand. Implementation of the Honeywell pilot project gave SGCC the latest technologies and perspective on how to realize the benefits of demand response. China is the World's largest Transmission and Distribution market with capital expenditures on power lines growing at an annual rate of 15 to 20 percent until 2018. With this level of investment, US companies can test and commercialize the technology in China at a faster and larger scale than in other parts of the World, including developed countries.

The agencies involved in the ADR pilot deemed it a success and the technology is now being implemented in other parts of China, including Shanghai. The results of the program showed that "the industrial site’s load reduction varied with the production schedule. The site saw a reduction of 7.7 percent during full production periods. When not operating at full production, the site’s demand response shed capacity increased more than 30 percent. The two commercial buildings provided a more stable and consistent load shed response, shedding between 15 and 20 percent."

=== Other Deployments ===
In the lead-up to 2015, Chinese regulatory agencies projected the domestic smart grid market to reach $20 billion annually. Under these estimates, ultra-high voltage (UHV) transmission systems were expected to constitute over 60% of the market sector, with smart meters and wind power integration projected at $2 billion and $800 million annually, respectively.

SGCC has implemented these smart grid technologies in areas such as Liangjiang, with the project there passing inspection in Q3 of 2014. It currently comprises one 220 kV substation and seven 110 kV substations. SGCC also launched the first UHV power grid in Tianjin in November 2014. The project calls for 290 transmission towers to be built, with 22 of those already constructed. Tianjin currently imports 20 percent of its electricity, and this project will increase that total to 30 percent with an estimated additional capacity of 5 million KW. Tianjin's maximum voltage will also double, from 500 kV to 1000 kV, all while reducing coal consumption by 9 million tons, as well as reducing carbon dioxide, sulfur dioxide, and nitrous oxide emissions.

In March 2014, the National Grid Corporation of the Philippines (NGCP) approached SGCC for a technical partnership and expertise to help the Philippines in their smart grid pilot project in Antipolo.
