= Jianye, Nanjing =

Jianye 建邺区
- District
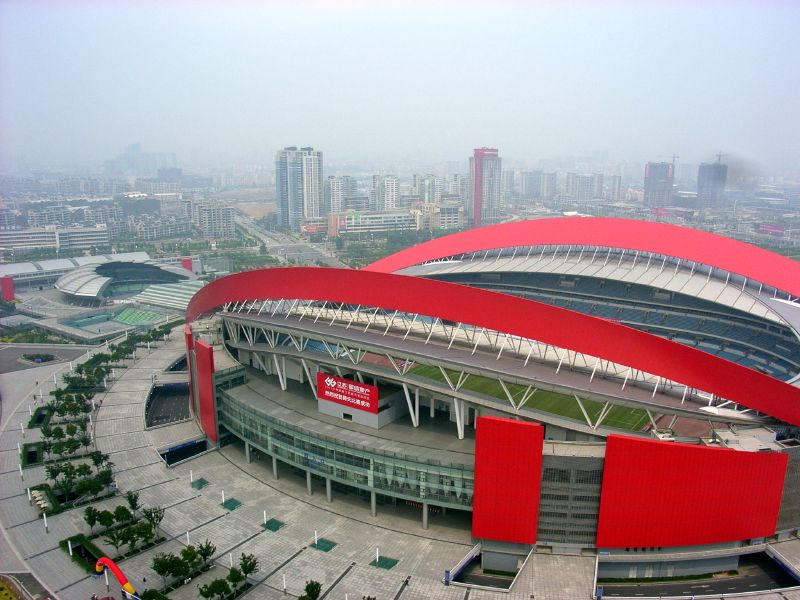
- Nanjing Olympic Sports Centre

- Location in Jiangsu
- Coordinates: 32°01′28″N 118°42′39″E
- Country: China
- Province: Jiangsu
- Sub-provincial city: Nanjing

Area
  - Total: 82 km^{2} (32 sq mi)

Population (2020 census)
  - Total: 534,257
  - Density: 6,500/km^{2} (17,000/sq mi)
- Time zone: UTC+8 (China Standard)
- Postal code: 210019
- Area code: 025
Nanjing district map
Subdivisions of Nanjing, Jiangsu
City Proper
1	Xuanwu
2	Qinhuai
3	Jianye
4	Gulou
5	Yuhuatai
6	Qixia
Suburban
7	Jiangning
8	Pukou
9	Luhe
Rural
10	Lishui
11	Gaochun
- Website: njjy.gov.cn

Jianye District (simplified Chinese: 建邺区; traditional Chinese: 建鄴區; pinyin: Jiànyè Qū) is one of 11 districts of Nanjing, the capital of Jiangsu province, China.

== History ==
Nanjing, once called Jianye, was the capital city of six dynasties beginning in 3 AD, in large part because of its position on the Yangtze River.

== Administrative subdivisions ==
Jianye has administrative jurisdiction over the following 6 subdistricts:

Name	Chinese (S)	Hanyu Pinyin	Population (2010)	Area (km^{2})
Mochouhu Subdistrict	莫愁湖街道	Mòchóuhú Jiēdào	125,765	4.3
Shazhou Subdistrict	沙洲街道	Shāzhōu Jiēdào	56,474	11.7
Shuangzha Subdistrict	双闸街道	Shuāngzhá Jiēdào	19,560	17
Jiangxinzhou Subdistrict	江心洲街道	Jiāngxīnzhōu Jiēdào	20,865	14.3
Xinglong Subdistrict	兴隆街道	Xīnglóng Jiēdào	67,274	8.21
Nanyuan Subdistrict	南苑街道	Nányuàn Jiēdào	110,596	3.2

- Defunct - Binhu Subdistrict (滨湖街道) & Nanhu Subdistrict (南湖街道) both subdistricts merged with Mochu Subdistrict that formerly part of Gulou District to form Mochouhu Subdistrict under Jianye.

The Jianye district is responsible for the administration of the following urban areas:

Direction	Place	Image	Comments
North	Mochouhu Subdistrict / Binhu Subdistrict (莫愁湖街道) / (滨湖街道)		Northeast area, near and including Mochou Lake
North	Nanyuan Subdistrict (南苑街道)		South of the Mochou Lake area.
North	Shazhou Subdistrict (沙洲街道)		West of the Mochou Lake area. Including the Nanjing Massacre Memorial Wall.
Center	Hexi (河西中央商务区)		Includes the Nanjing International Expo Center
Center	Conference and Tourism Center (江东商业文化旅游中心区)		West of the Nanjing Olympic Sports Center and including the Jinling Riverside Conference Hotel
Center	Xinglong Subdistrict (兴隆街道)		Also known as Booming Subdistrict. In the area of the Nanjing Olympic Sports Center. The arena has the capacity for 60,000 people
West	Jiangxin Island (江心洲街道)		Also known as Jiangxinzhou and the New Nanjing Eco-Technology Island
East	Jianye Metro Technology Park (建邺区新城科技园)		East and southeast of the Nanjing Olympic Sports Center.
South	Shuangzha Subdistrict (双闸街道)		In the southern area of the district.

== Transportation ==
Rail service is available at the Yuantong Station between Line 1 and Line 2. Line 1 service at Olympic Stadium Station, and Line 2 service at Olympic Stadium East Station, Mochouhu Station, Jiqingmendajie Station, Xinglongdajie Station, Yurundajie Station, and Youfangqiao Station of the Nanjing Metro.

Jiangxin Island may be reached via the Yingtian Street Elevated Bridge, which is a 760-metre (2,490 ft) bridge that connects the island, and its YOG Forest Park, to the mainland at the Nanjing International Expo Center, one of the sites for the 2014 Summer Youth Olympics. It is the first pedestrian bridge to cross the Yangtze.

== Economy ==
Everbright International has its Nanjing office in Lianqiang International Mansion (联强国际大厦) in Jianye District.

== See also ==
Education

- Nanjing Audit University
