= Xuanwu =

Xuanwu or Xuan Wu may refer to:

== Mythology ==
- Black Tortoise or Turtle, one of the Four Symbols of Chinese astronomy
- Xuanwu (god) ("Dark Warrior"), a god in Chinese religion

== People ==
- Emperor Xuanwu of Northern Wei

== Geography ==
- Xuanwu District, Beijing, China
- Xuanwu District, Nanjing, Jiangsu, China
- Xuanwu Lake in Nanjing, China
- Xuanwu, Luyi County, a town in Luyi County, Henan, in China
