= Qingliang Temple (Nanjing) =

Buddhist temple in Nanjing, China

- 清涼寺
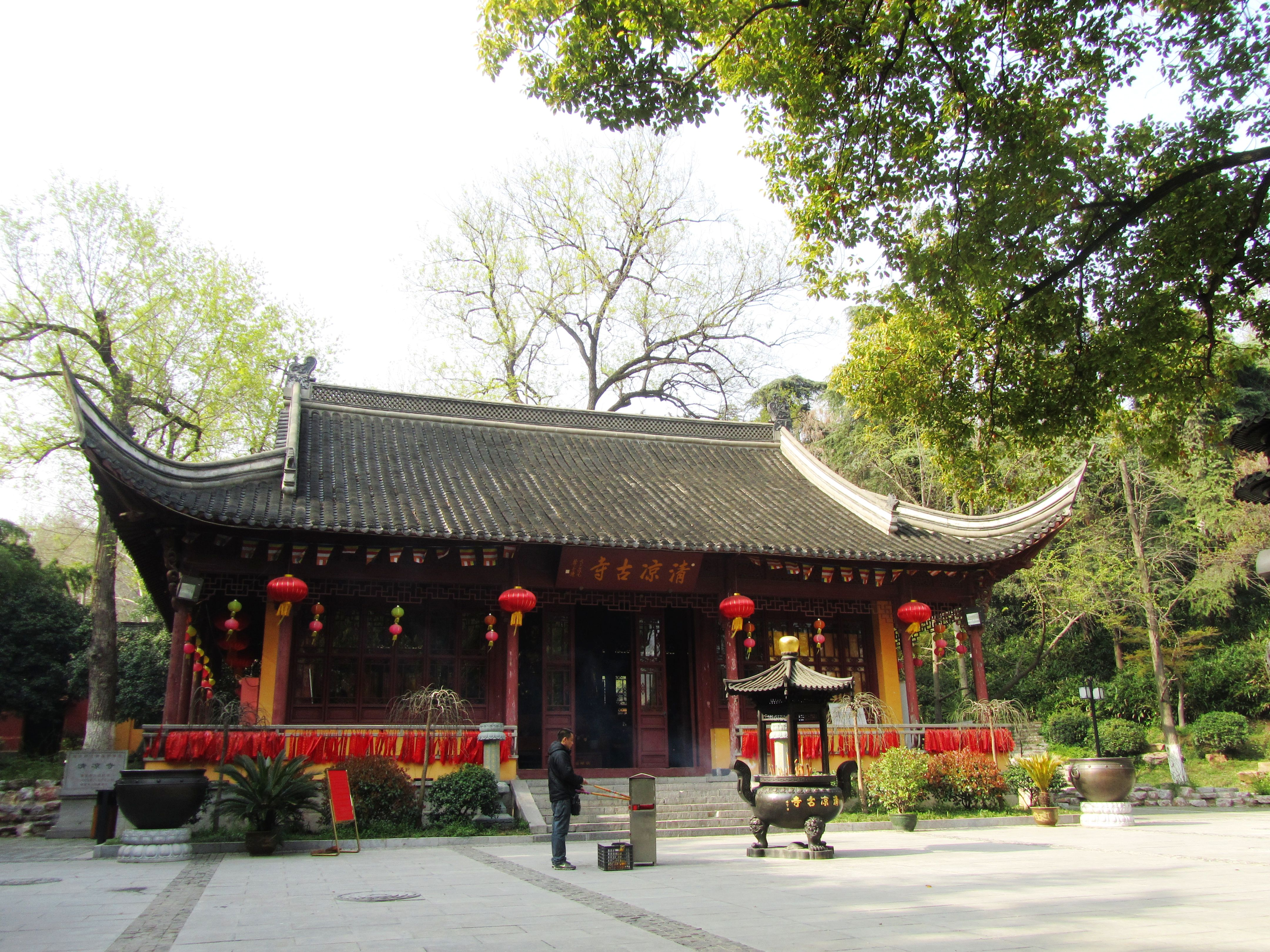
- Qingliang Temple in Nanjing

Religion
- Affiliation: Buddhism

Location
- Country: China

Qingliang Temple (Chinese: 清涼寺; pinyin: Qīngliáng Sì), also known as Stone Cooling Bodhimaṇḍa (traditional Chinese: 石頭清涼大道場), literally means "cooling temple". The temple is located in Qingliangshan Park in the west of Nanjing City, Jiangsu, China.

== History ==
The temple was formerly known as the Xingjiao Temple (traditional Chinese: 興教寺場; ; pinyin: Xìng Jiào Sì) and was built by Xu Wen during the Yang Wu of the Five Dynasties and Ten Kingdoms period. In the first year of the Southern Tang dynasty (937), Li Jing (the second ruler of Southern Tang) spent the summer at this place and modified the name of the temple to "Stone Cooling Bodhimaṇḍa (traditional Chinese: 石頭清涼大道場)".

Later, Li Yu (the third and last ruler of Southern Tang) left an inscription of "Deqing Hall" (德慶堂). Monk Wenyi resided in this temple and built the Fayan school (Chinese: 法眼宗; pinyin: Fǎyǎn Zōng).

The temple was rebuilt in 980 during the Northern Song dynasty. In 1402, it was rebuilt by the Yongle Emperor of the Ming dynasty and was renamed "Qingliang Temple." After the Taiping Heavenly Kingdom, Second Sino-Japanese War, Cultural Revolution and other catastrophic damages. The temple was renovated in 2003 and opened in 2009.

== See also ==
- Qingliangshan Park
- Stone City, adjacent to Qingliangshan Park

== Notes ==
1. The Fayan school was one of the Five Houses of Chán, the major schools of Chinese Chán during the later Tang dynasty.
