= China Gate Castle Park =

Park in Nanjing, Jiangsu province, China

Coordinates: 32°0′52.87″N 118°46′35.35″E

China Gate Castle Park (Chinese: 中华门城堡公园)
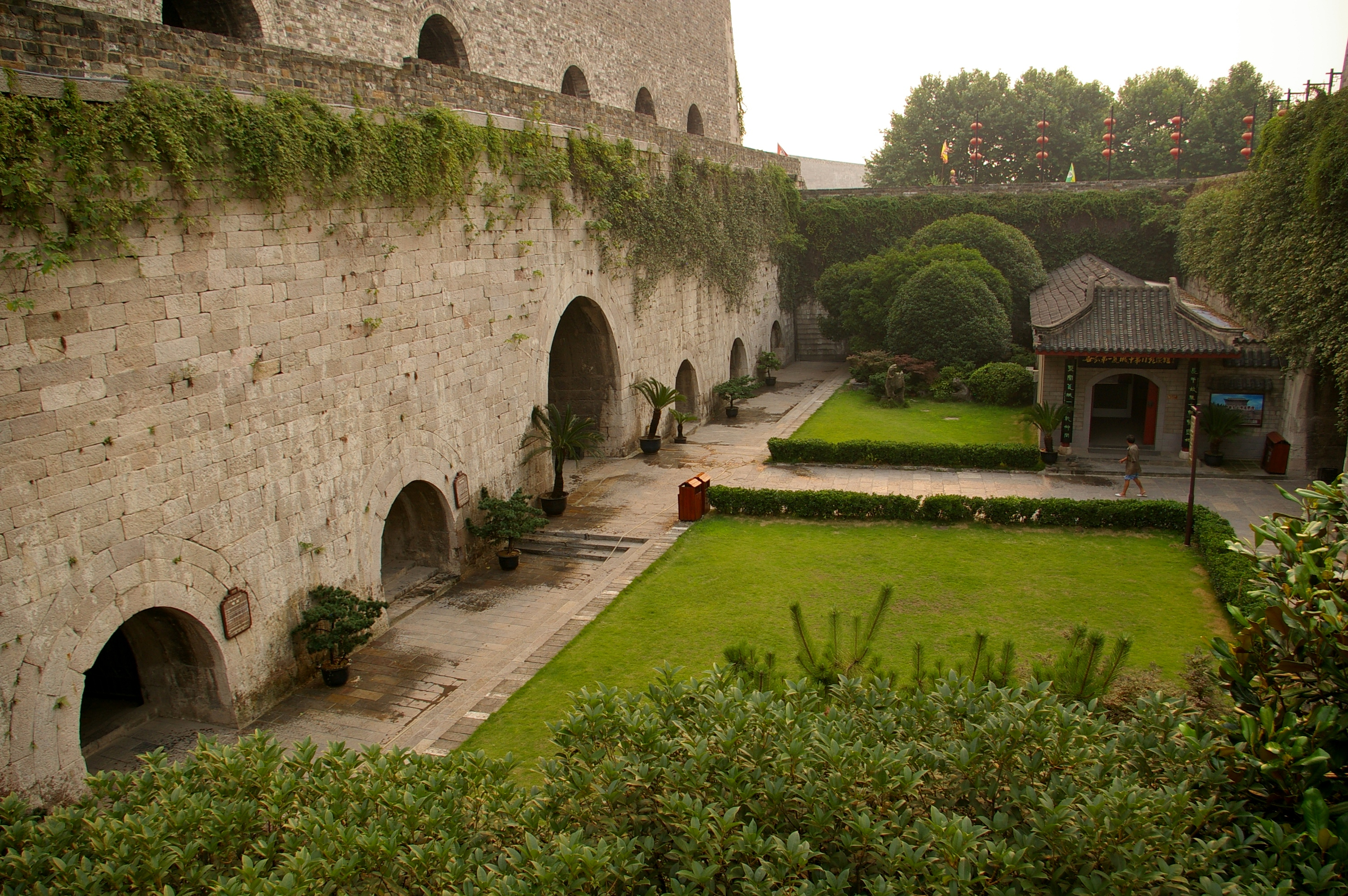
- Interactive map of China Gate Castle Park (Chinese: 中华门城堡公园)
- Location: Nanjing, China

China Gate Castle Park (Chinese: 中华门城堡公园) is a park in Nanjing, Jiangsu province, China. It is located north of the Qinhai River, south of the Nanjing City Wall and near the Changgan Bridge. Entrance to the treelined riverside park is gained through the China Gate.

The City of Nanjing has identified it as one of the top five parks in the city. Others are Mochou Lake Park, Qingliangshan Park, Wuchaomen Park and Xuanwu Lake.
