= Defence Park (Nanjing) =

Defense education park in Jiangsu, China

Defence Park (Chinese: 南京国防园)
- Nanjing National Defense Park
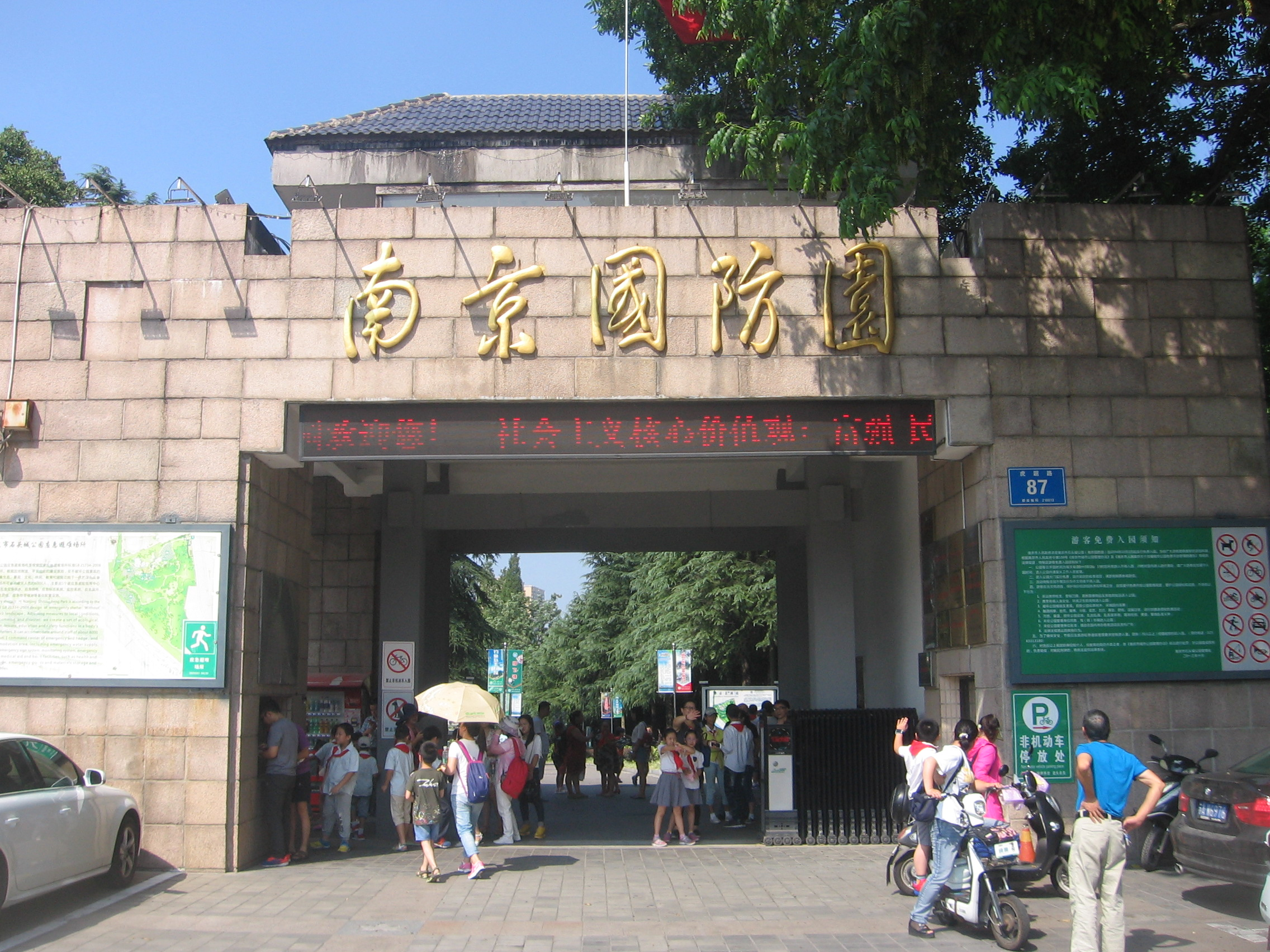
- Interactive map of Defence Park (Chinese: 南京国防园)
- Location: Nanjing, Jiangsu, China

Defence Park or Nanjing National Defense Park is a national defense education park located in Nanjing, Jiangsu, China. In April 2014, for instance, it held an exhibit of models of the Chinese naval fleet.

The National Defense Education Hall is one of the 39 sites on the 2014 Nanjing Parks Annual Pass, added with other cultural sites in 2014. The electronic pass is sold to residents and non-residents of Nanjing.

== See also ==
- Stone City, the defense park is within Stone City
- Qingliangshan Park, adjacent to Stone City
