= Wuchaomen Park =

Park in Nanjing, China

Wuchaomen Park (Chinese: 午朝门公园)
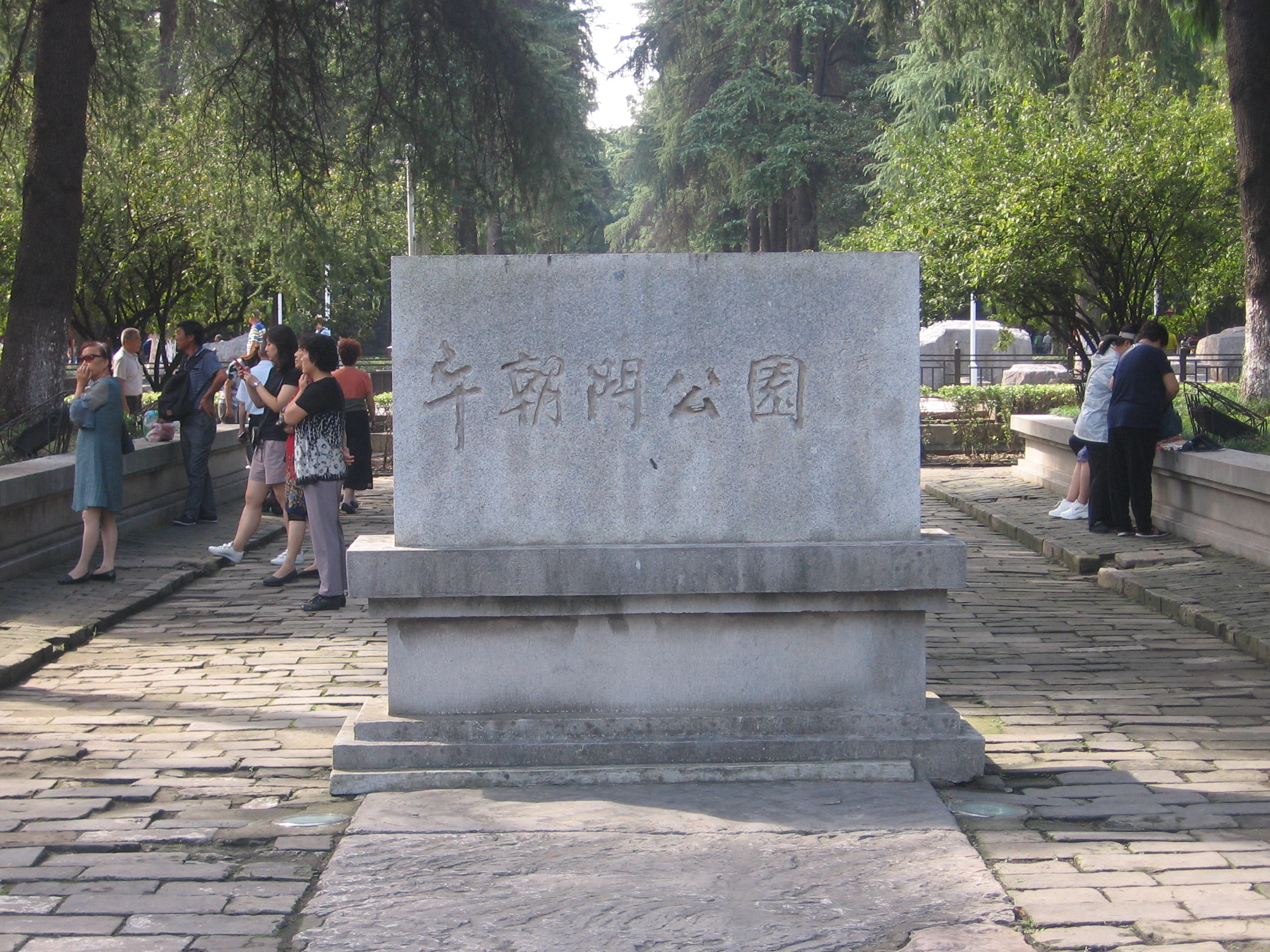
- Location: 28 Yudao Road, Baixia District, Nanjing, China (鼓楼区广州路83号)
- Nanjing district map
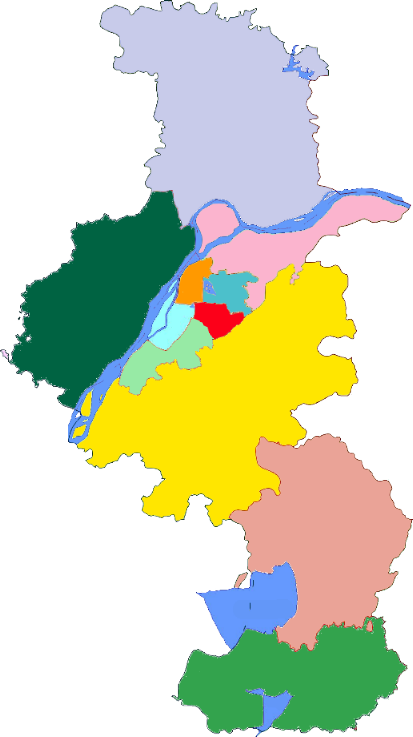
City Proper
1	Xuanwu
2	Qinhuai
3	Jianye
4	Gulou
5	Yuhuatai
6	Qixia
Suburban
7	Jiangning
8	Pukou
9	Luhe
Rural
10	Lishui
11	Gaochun

Wuchaomen Park (Chinese: 午朝门公园) is a park located in Baixia District, Nanjing, China. The site once the forbidden grounds of a Ming Palace and has a palace gate dated from 1367, one of the few such gates that still exists in the city. Wuchaomen Park has a view over tree-lined Yudao road from the top of a grey-bricked structure. It has a reputation for saxophone playing and opera singing by local residents. Some visitors also practice tai chi or walk backwards in circles.

The City of Nanjing has identified it as one of the top five parks in the city. Others are Mochou Lake Park, Xuanwu Lake, Qingliangshan Park and China Gate Castle Park.
