= Qingliang Shan =

Qingliang Shan may refer to:

- Mount Wutai in Shanxi Province, China
- Qingliangshan Park in Nanjing, China
