= Xuanwu Lake =

Lake in Nanjing, Jiangsu, China

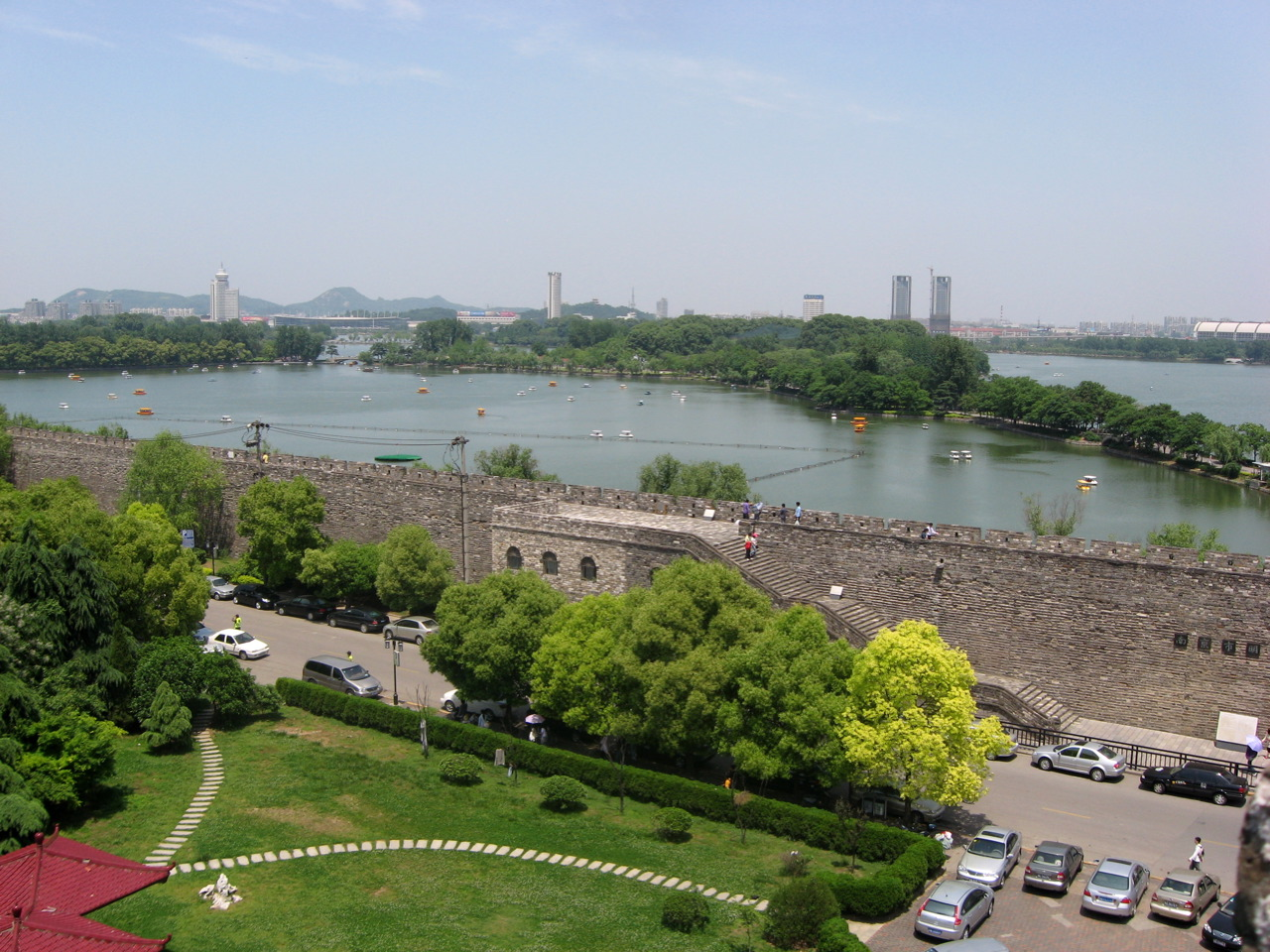
- Xuanwu Lake, with the Nanjing City Wall in the foreground, its islands in the center of the lake, and Nanjing's skyline and mountains in the distance. This is seen from Taicheng, the part of the City Wall that lines the west side of the lake.

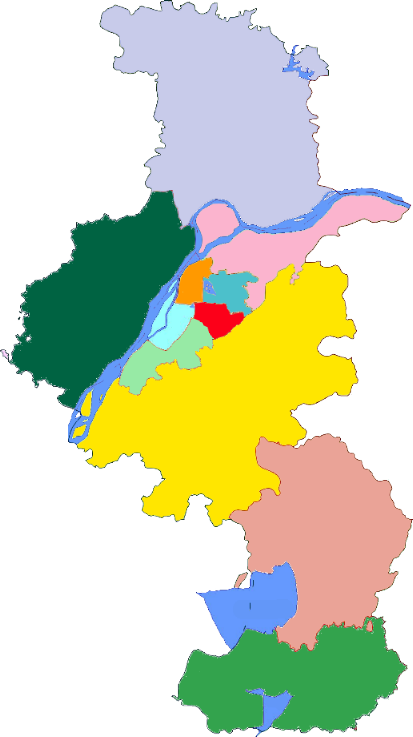
- Location of Xuanwu Lake Xuanwu Lake (Jiangsu)
- Location: Xuanwu District, Nanjing, Jiangsu
- Coordinates: 32°04′23″N 118°47′54″E
- Basin countries: China
- Surface area: 444 hectares (1,100 acres)
- Islands: 5

Xuanwu Lake (Chinese: 玄武湖; pinyin: Xuánwǔ Hú) is located in Xuanwu District in the central-northeast part of Nanjing, Jiangsu. It is near the Nanjing Railway Station and Jiming Temple. Five islands within the lake are interconnected by arched bridges. Within the park are temples, pagodas, pavilions, gardens, teahouses, restaurants, entertainment venues, a small zoo, and other attractions. Its main entrance is the Xuanwu Gate.

== History ==
The lake was formed, according to geologists, when tectonic plates shifted and created Mount Yanshan. A legend is that Emperor Sun Quan (182–252) settled in the Nanjing area and he had the lake created and filled with water. The lake was named for a black dragon, believed to be a water god by Chinese Taoists, from a Southern dynasty (420–859) legend. The dragon, seen in the lake, looked like a tortoise and a snake and was named Xuanwu, meaning Black Turtle-Snake.

During the Six Dynasties period (222–859) a garden on a basaltic site was created, which is now considered one of the most scenic places in the park. The area was used for hunting and training by the emperor's family members.

Also called "Military Rehearsal Lake", the lake was used for naval battle exercises during the Song dynasty (960–1279). The "Yellow Book Storage", or the "Yellow Register Archives", was built there in the beginning of the Ming dynasty (1368–1644), and it was thus made an imperial garden and "forbidden land".

The lake and surrounding area was made into a park in 1911 after the end of the Qing dynasty. It was renamed from Yuanwu Lake Park to "Continental Park" in 1928 and officially made Xuanwu Lake Park in 1935. A plan was made for the 2005 creation of the Li Yu Cultural Park, Garden Park, Qingyinge pavilion and an immortality garden.

== Description ==
The main entrance to the Xuanwu Lake Park is through Xuanwu Gate, which is part of the Nanjing City Wall that borders the south and east portions of the park and Ji Ming Temple is in its southwestern area. The Zifeng Tower overlooks the lake. The 444 hectares (1,100 acres) lake is 15 kilometres (9.3 mi) in circumference. Xuanwu Lake has a surface area of 3.78 square kilometres (1.46 sq mi). In recent years, the amount of water diverted from the upper reaches of Xuanwu Lake has increased, and the water quality has improved, supporting many creatures.

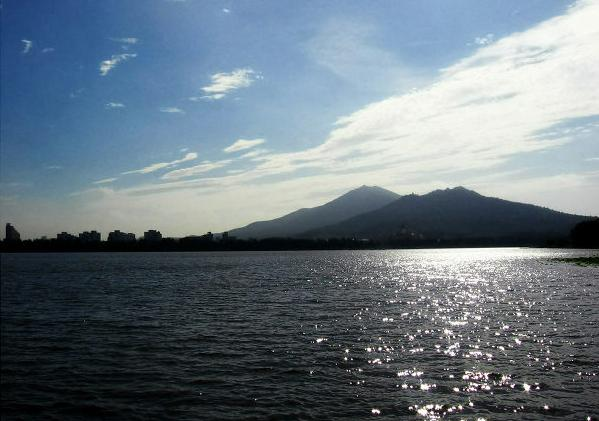
Xuanwu Lake with Purple Mountain in the distance

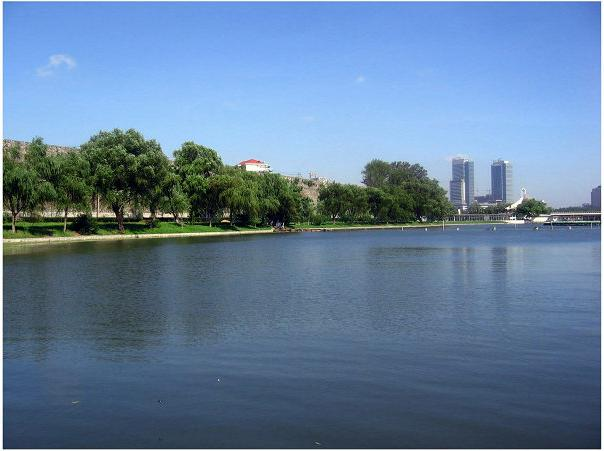
Xuanwu Lake, with the city skyline and Nanjing's City Wall in the distance

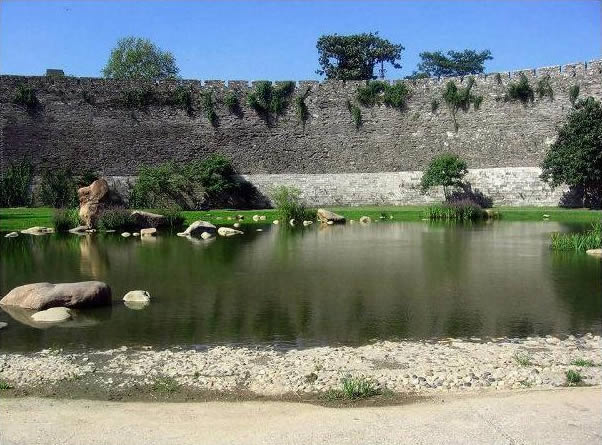
Pool and Nanjing City Wall

== Ecology ==
Spanning approximately 444 hectares with a 15 km shoreline, Xuanwu Lake encompasses five islets interconnected by arch bridges. Eutrophication became a major issue in the 1980s–2000s.A study of Xuanwu Lake found that water temperature was the primary factor affecting Microcystis abundance, while phosphorus loading was a major factor governing its growth. Large-scale sediment dredging, algal bloom control, and vegetation planting efforts in 2009 and 2014 have notably improved water quality. Recent surveys indicate further improvement, though nutrient management remains crucial.

== Park ==
Xuanwu Lake Park (玄武湖公园), once an imperial lake garden, is now a city park. In the spring, the pink cherry blossom trees are in bloom. Summer visitors experience emerald lotus leaves, flowers, and "a peaceful haven of weeping willows" followed by red maples and golden ginkgos in the fall. Arch bridges connect five islands. The "Autumn Chrysanthemum of Liang Islet" has the Lake God Temple, Wenji Pavilion, the Peony Garden, Bonsai Museum, and a fish pond. The "Flowers Sea of Ying Islet" is sanctuary to more than 200 rare species of birds. An entertainment venue, including a bandstand, is located on "Green Islet." Clouds and Mists of Ling Islet" has a playground for children. The fifth island is the "Willows and Smokes of Huanzhou Islet".

Within the scenic park are pagodas, pavilions, tea houses, and restaurants. Entertainment options include boating, zoo, and an outdoor theatre. Key attractions include the Nuo'na tower, Lama Temple, cenotaph of Guo Pu, and the Rose Garden. On the lake are boats and ferries. It is also considered the "Pearl of the Stone City". If desired, a visitor could stroll through the park for up to five hours.

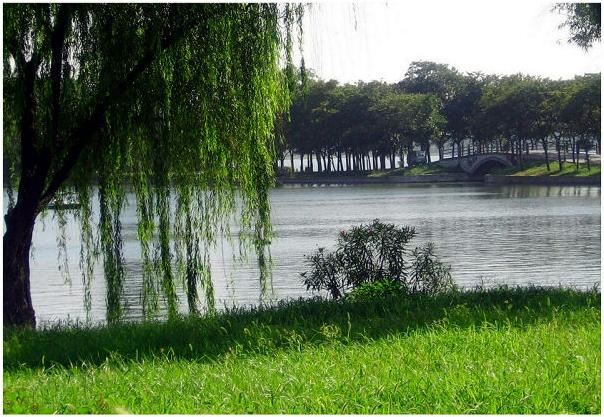
Willows

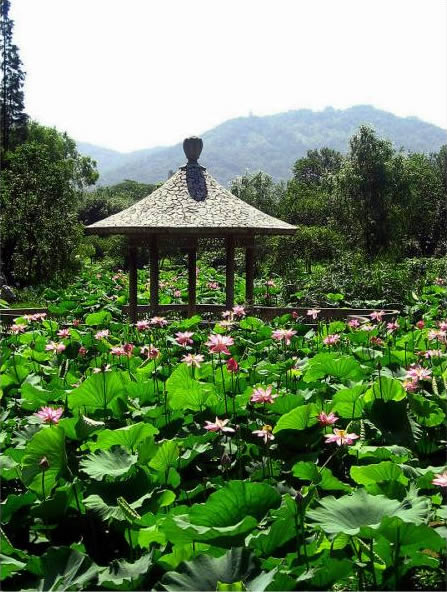
Lotus flowers

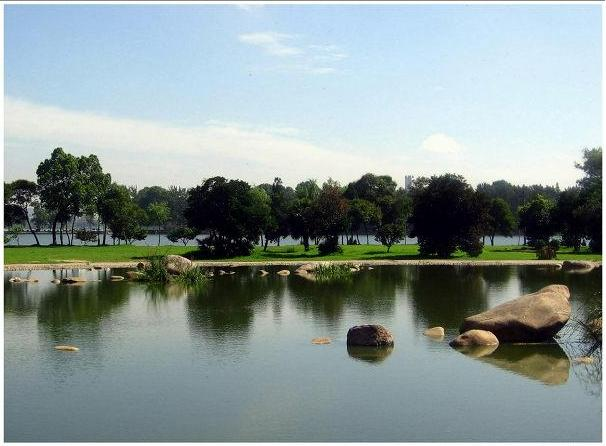
Lake view

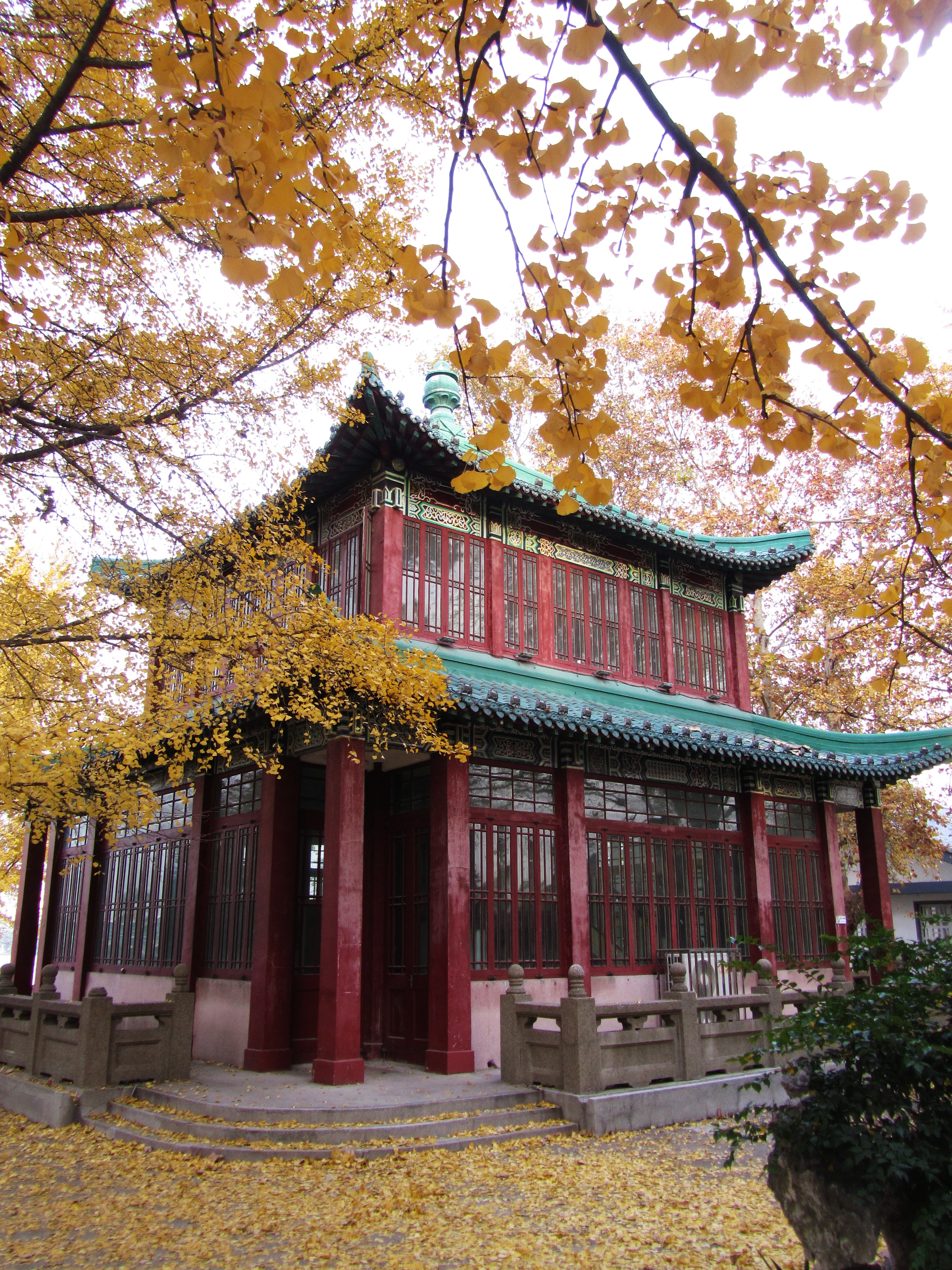
Lansheng Tower

It is designated a National Grade AAAA Attraction. The City of Nanjing has identified it as one of the top five parks in the city. Others are Mochou Lake Park, Qingliangshan Park, Wuchaomen Park and China Gate Castle Park.

Nanjing's Couple Park, or Qinglüyuan Xuanwu (南京情侣园), is adjacent to the western edge of Xuanwu Lake and behind the Nanjing International Exhibition Center.

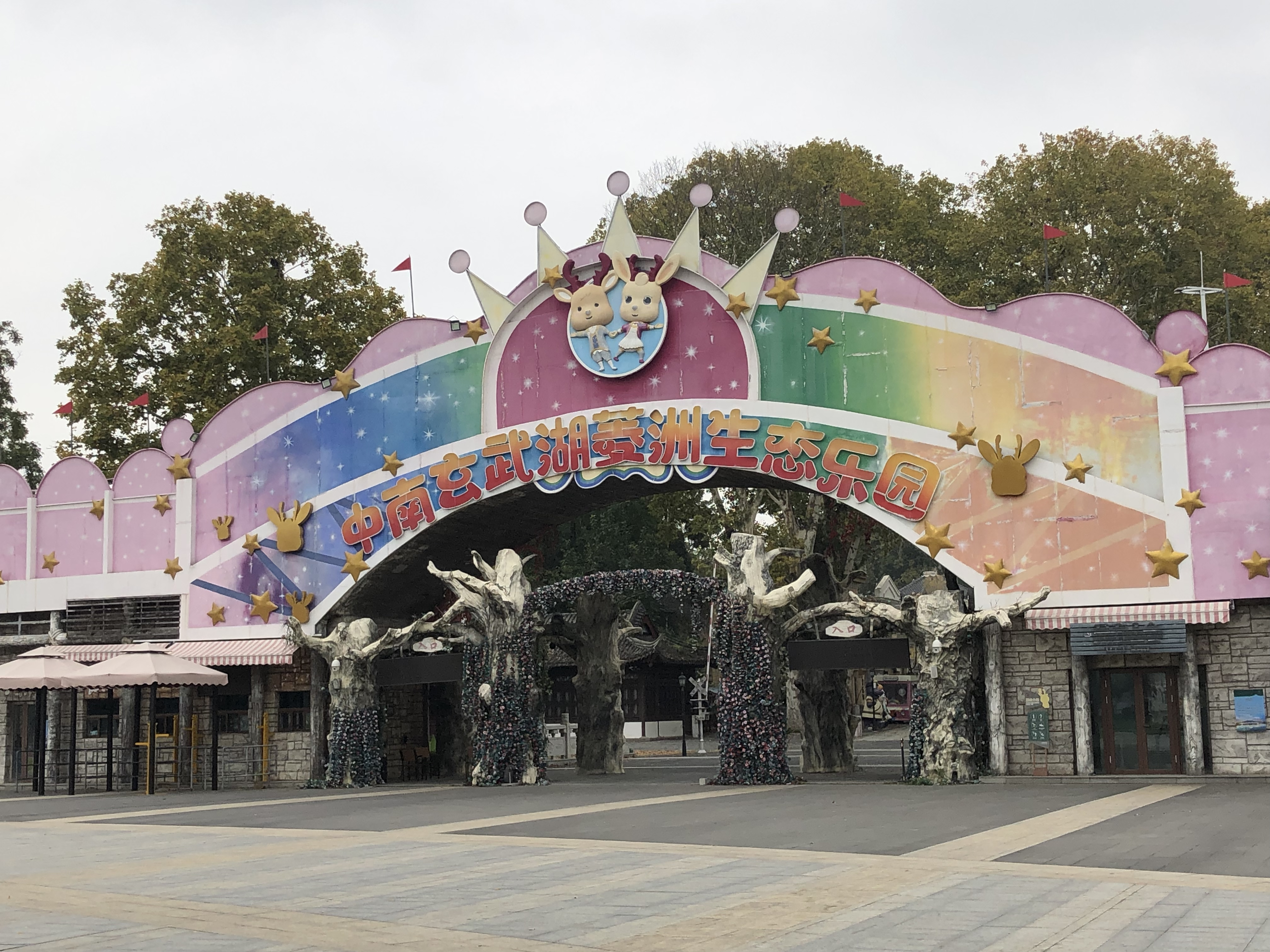
The original site of Xuanwu Lake Zoo, now part of the scenic park

== Landmarks ==
Several notable historic structures occupy the five islets within Xuanwu Lake Park:

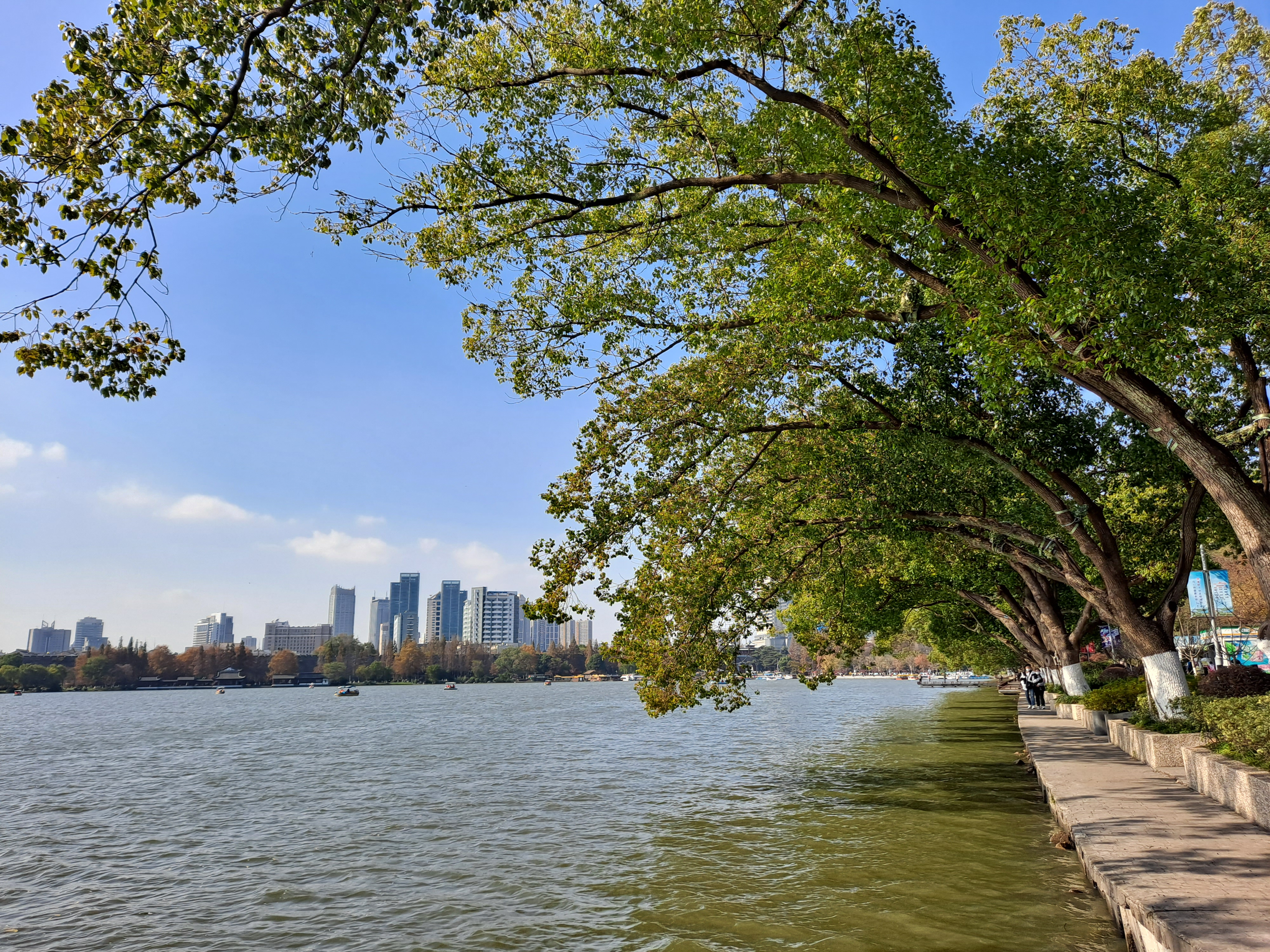
Five islets of Xuanwu Lake connected by traditional arched bridges

=== Guopu Mound ===
Guopu Mound (郭璞墩), located on Huan Isle, is a tomb mound topped by a commemorative pavilion and stone tablet honoring Jin‑dynasty scholar Guo Pu. The pavilion was rebuilt and inscribed in 1934.

=== Lansheng Tower ===
Lansheng Tower (览胜楼), originally built during the Six Dynasties and rebuilt in 1909, is a two‑storey pavilion with green glazed tiles that offers panoramic views of the lake and Purple Mountain.

== Flora and wildlife ==
Xuanwu Lake Park is renowned for spring cherry blossoms on Ying Isle and Jiming Temple Road.In addition to pink and white varieties, rare green cherry blossoms are also present. Ying Isle serves as a bird sanctuary hosting over 200 species of rare birds.

== Seasonal highlights ==
- Spring: Cherry blossoms bloom on Yingzhou (Ying Isle) and along Jiming Temple Road in March, attracting large numbers of visitors. During the peak bloom period, Jiming Temple receives an average of approximately 25,000 visitors per day.
- Summer: Extensive lotus blooms cover the lake surface from June to August, especially near Liang and Ling Isles.
- Autumn: Chrysanthemum exhibitions on Liang Isle and canopy foliage along Huanhu Road offer picturesque vistas.
- Winter: Scenic mist and reflective waters set the scene for New Year strolls, with fewer crowds and serene atmosphere noted in January recommendations.

== Cultural events ==
The first Intangible Cultural Heritage Life Festivalwas held at Xuanwu Lake's Ying Isle in October 2024, featuring over 100 intangible heritage artisans, exhibits, live performances, and interactive craft workshops.

On February 14, 2025, the Spring Tour Nanjing · Flower Journey tourism event was launched at Xuanwu Lake, spotlighting flower appreciation, cycling routes, coffee festivals, and educational experiences for families.

Additionally, the 2025 Nanjing Cultural & Tourism Festival opened at Lotus Square on June 12, 2025, featuring over 100 events including cultural exhibitions, sports activities, and parent-child educational programs.

== Conservation and environmental education ==
In September 2024, the Xuanwu District Environmental Protection Bureau organized an "ecological civilization education base open day" at Xuanwu Lake, inviting local students to explore biodiversity, conduct water-sample testing, and learn about rare aquatic plants and urban lake conservation.

The Xuanwu Lake Scenic Area Protection Regulations, enacted in May 2010, govern land use, heritage conservation, and construction control within the park boundaries and its buffer zones.

== Access and activities ==
The park is served by Metro Line 1 at Xuanwumen station and multiple bus routes (e.g. 1, 3, 8, 22). Visitors enjoy boating, jogging along the 10-mile Huanhu Road, seasonal flower exhibitions, outdoor theater shows, and teahouses.

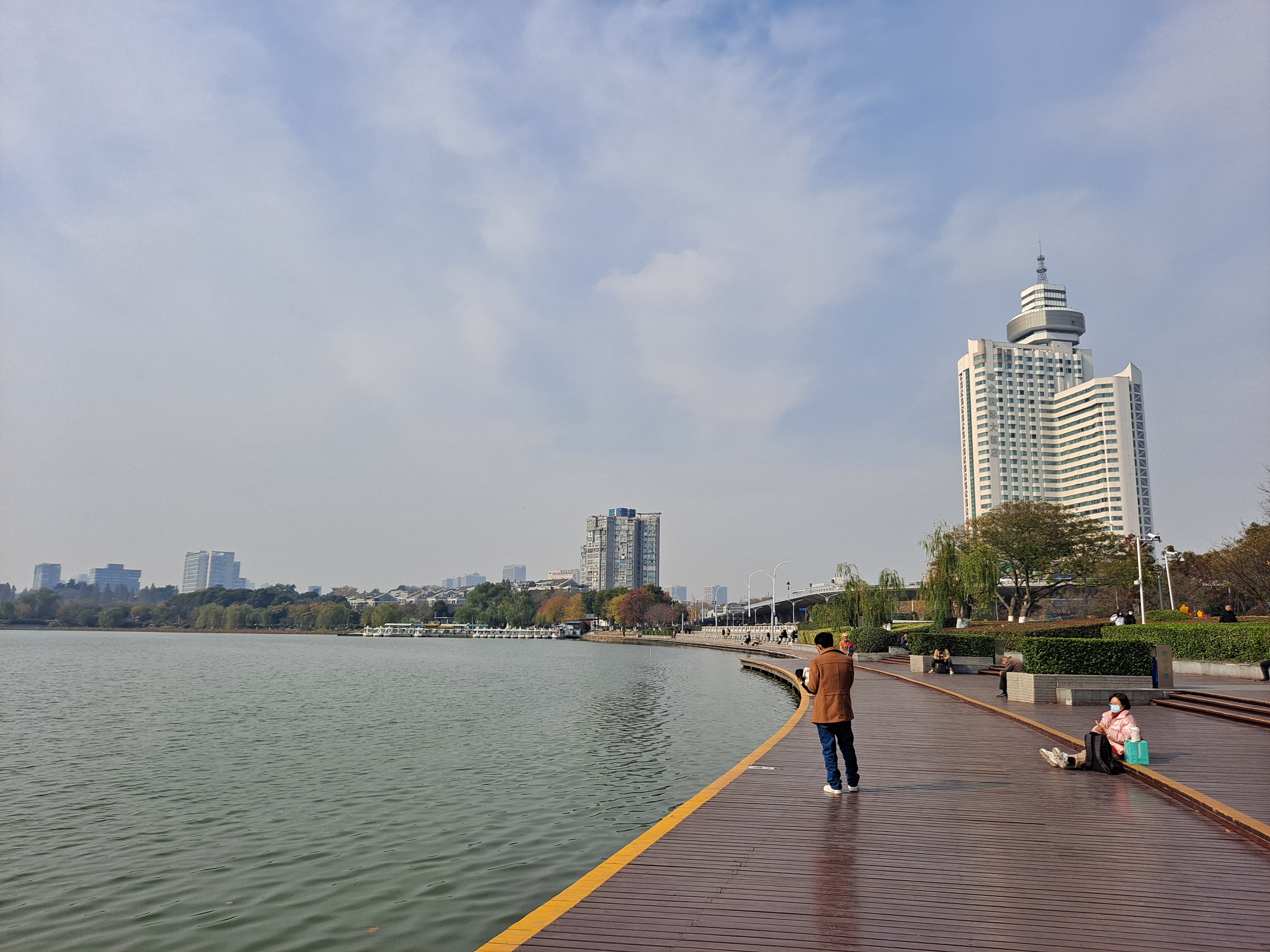
View of Xuanwu Lake promenade in front of Nanjing Railway Station

The park is open daily from 07:00 to 21:00 with no entrance fee.
