= Jiming Temple =

Buddhist temple in Nanjing, China

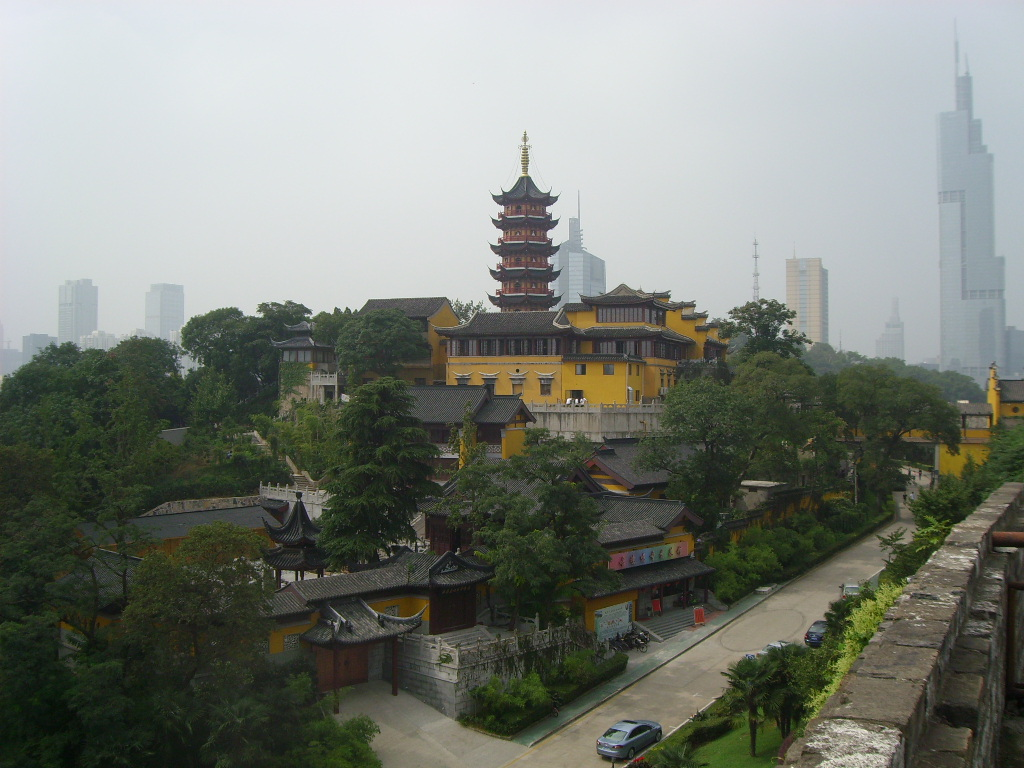
- Jiming Temple

- Location in Jiangsu

Religion
- Affiliation: Buddhism

Location
- Country: China
- Coordinates: 32°03′47″N 118°47′24″E

Architecture
- Completed: 527; 1499 years ago

Map

The Jiming Temple (simplified Chinese: 鸡鸣寺; traditional Chinese: 雞鳴寺; pinyin: Jīmíng Sì) is a renowned Buddhist temple in Nanjing, Jiangsu, China. One of the oldest temples in Nanjing, it is located in the Xuanwu District near Xuanwu Lake.

== History ==
The temple, which literally means "rooster crowing" was first constructed in 527 during the Liang dynasty and has been destroyed and reconstructed many times. The existing temple was initially constructed during the Ming dynasty during the reign of the Hongwu Emperor in 1387. It was destroyed during the Taiping Rebellion but was rebuilt later.

By 1931 most temple buildings had been appropriated as barracks by police and army of the Nationalist government of Republican China. The main hall had been emptied completely apart from the large Buddha statue. Only one hall, near the city wall was still being used for worship. The temple remained popular primarily because of its tea house which was also situated in that hall.

== Description ==
Within the temple are Guanyin Hall (观音殿), Huomeng Building (豁蒙楼), and the Medicine Buddha Pagoda (Chinese: 药师佛塔). The Rouge Well (胭脂井), got its name from a legend that the emperor of the Southern Tang Dynasty and his concubine hid themselves in the well to escape enemy pursuit. The stains of rouge were left on the well: hence the name of Rouge Well.

The seven-story pagoda overlooks Xuanwu Lake. There is an entrance to the Nanjing City Wall from the rear of the temple. Behind the temple there remains a section of palace wall called Taicheng.

It is the busiest temple in Nanjing, particularly during the Lunar New Year. The newly opened Line 3 metro line has a stop for the temple called Jimingsi.

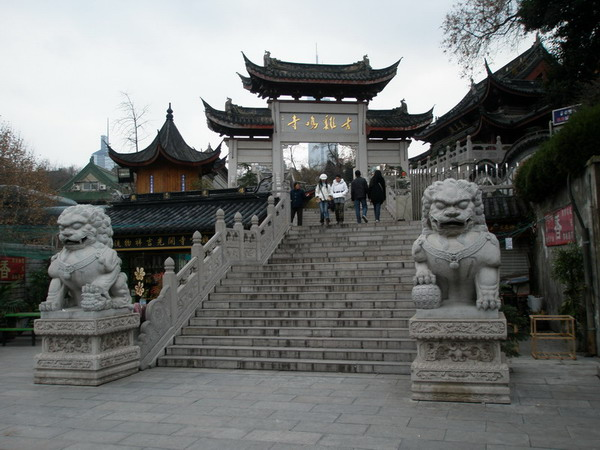
Jiming Temple entrance

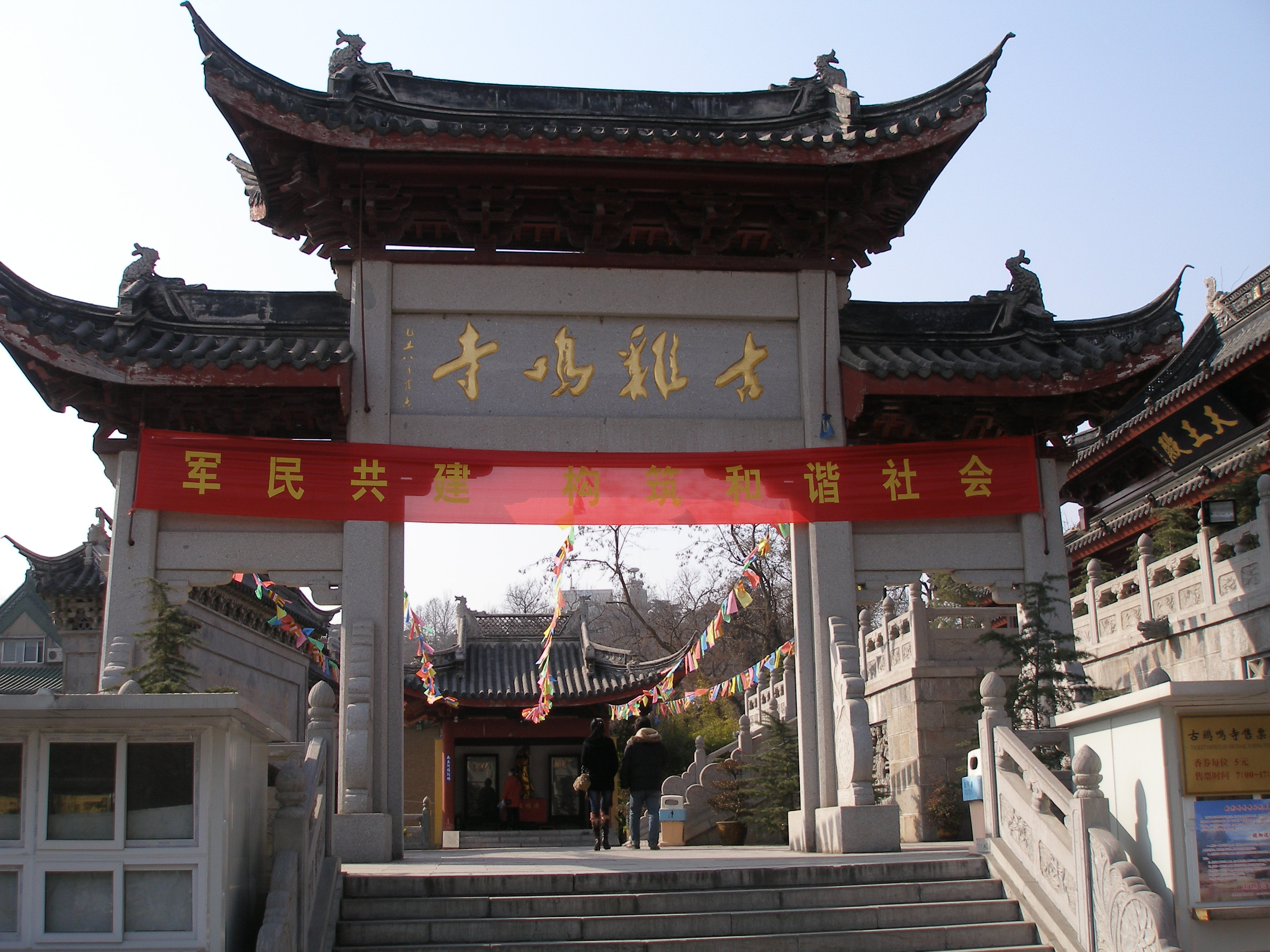
Jiming Temple entrance

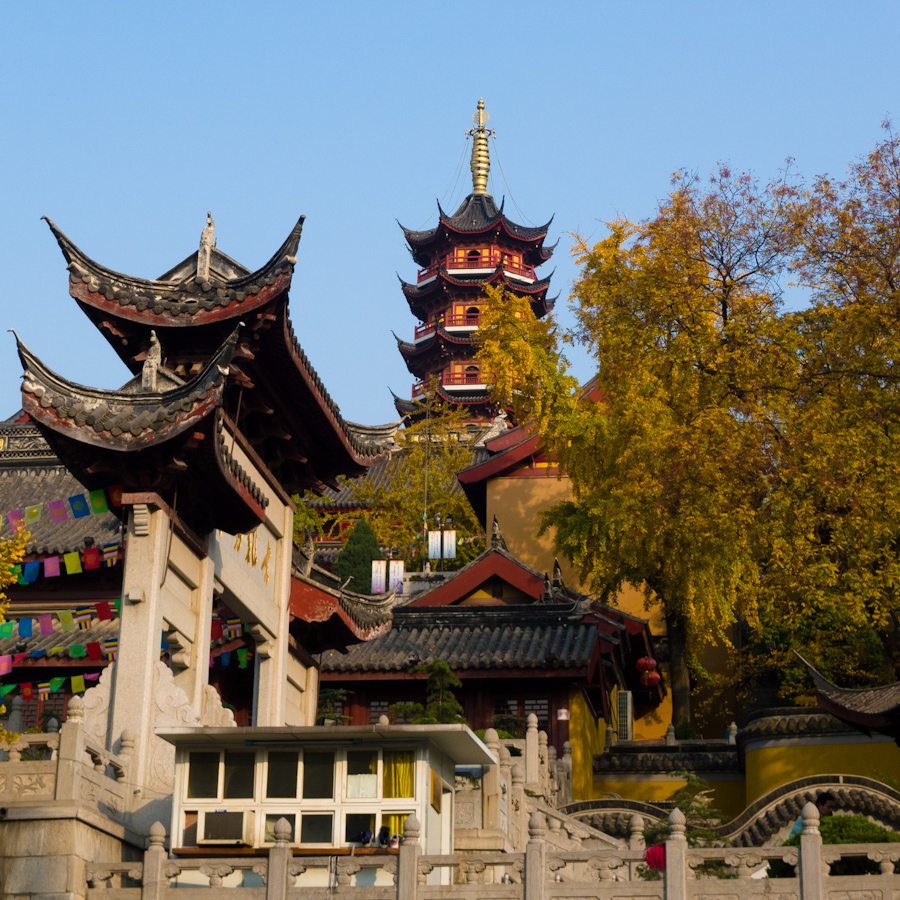
Jiming Temple

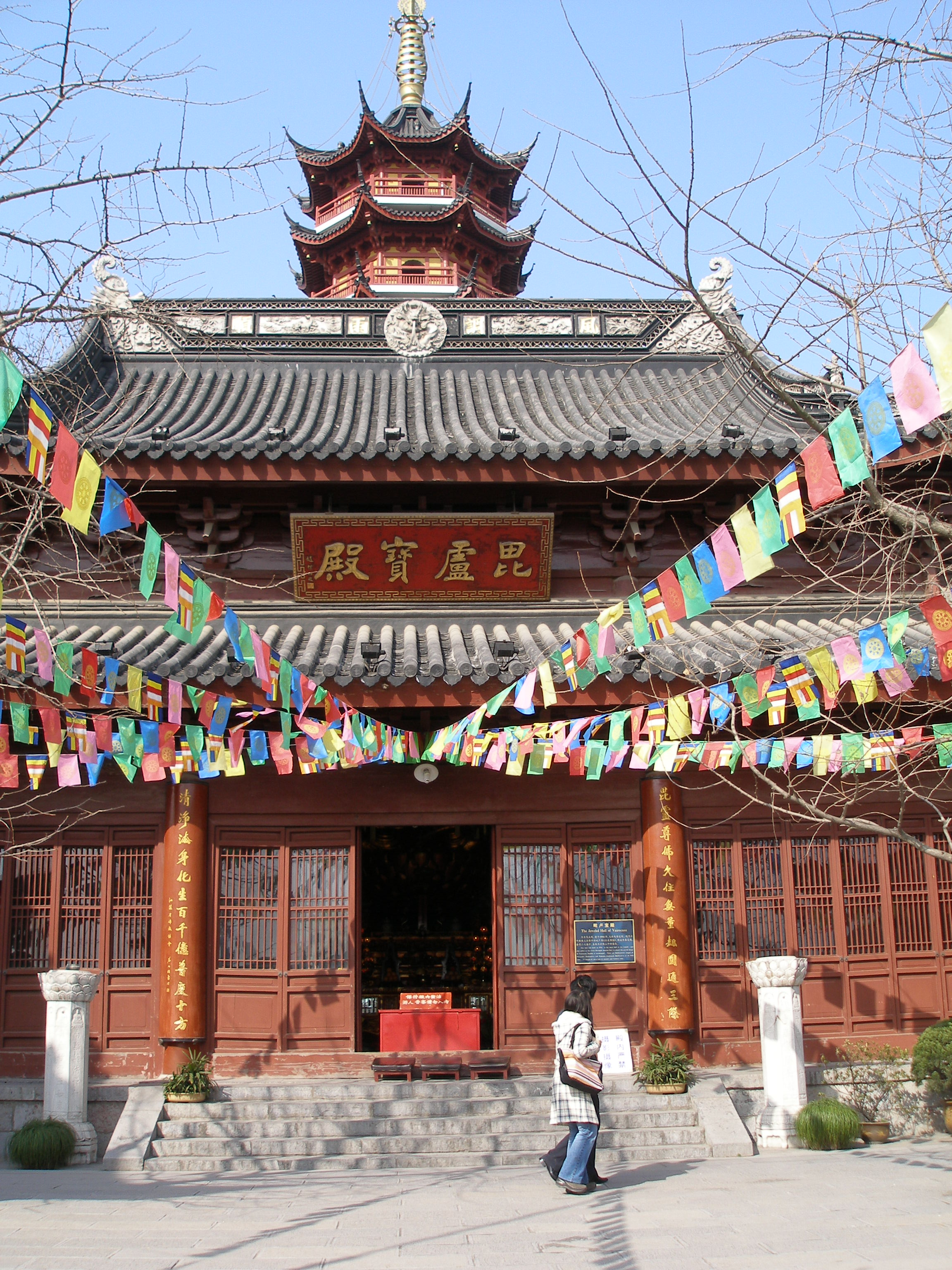
Pagoda

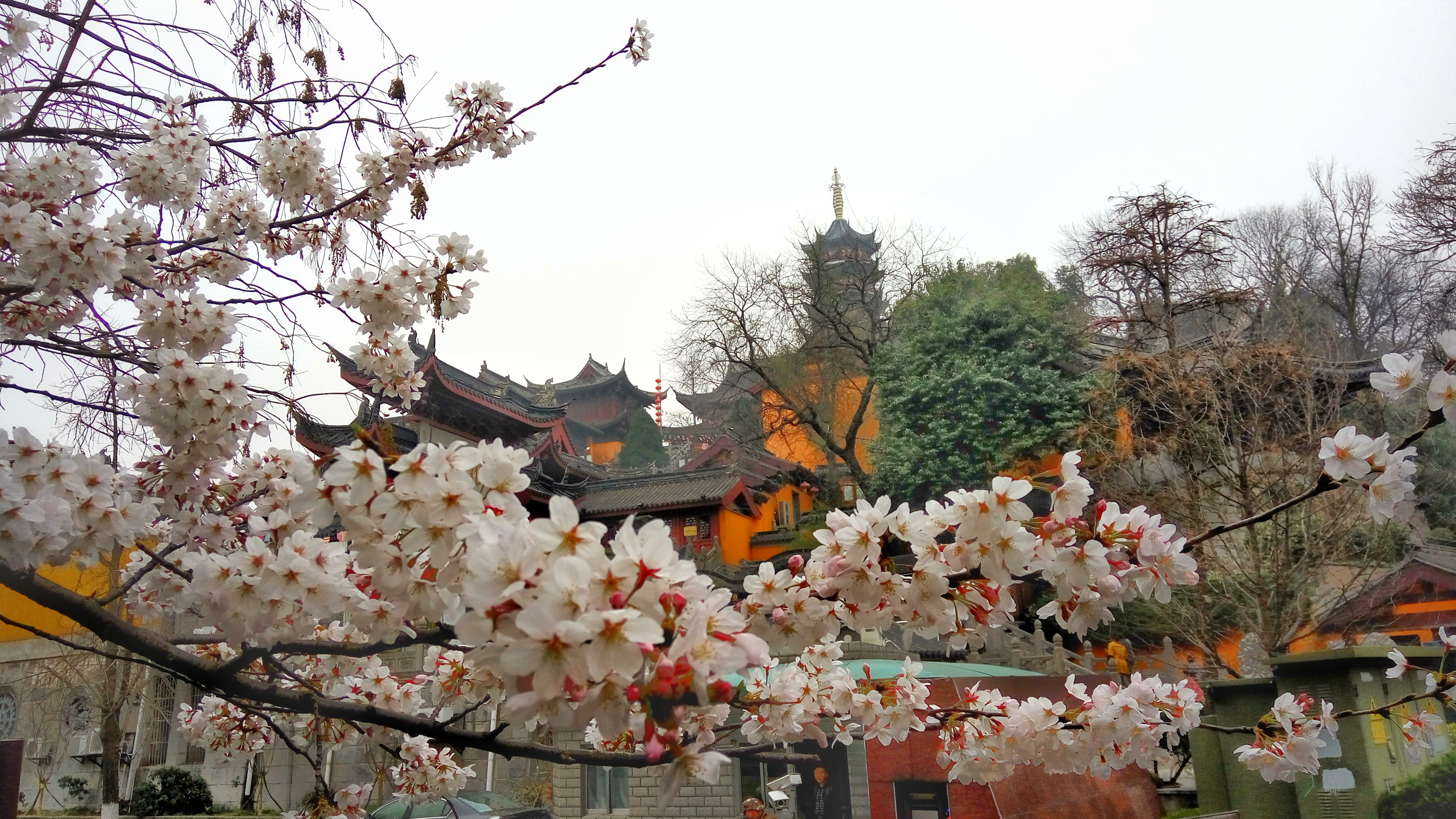
The area around Jiming Temple blooms with cherry blossoms in late February

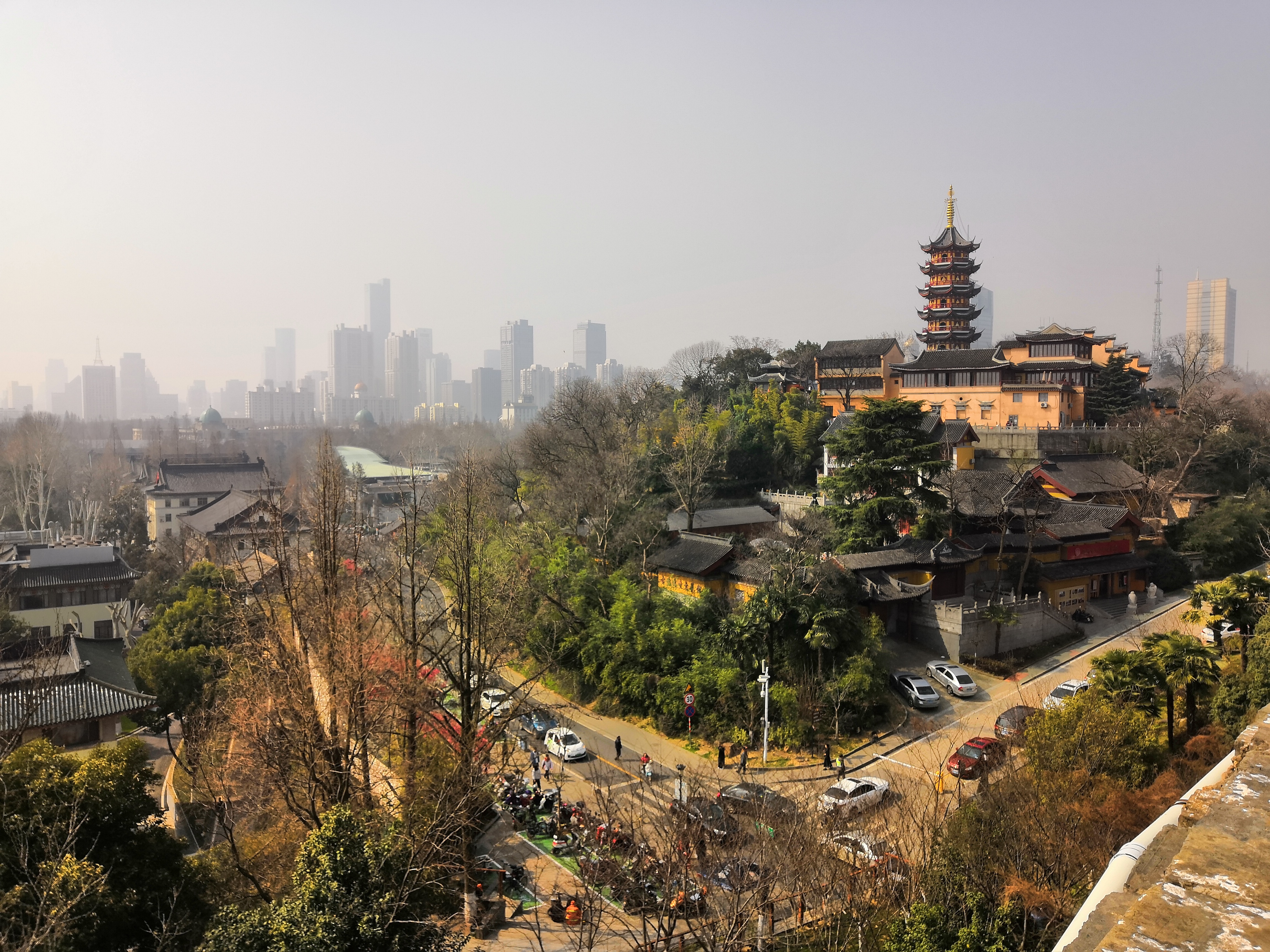
Jiming Temple, seen from the ancient city wall

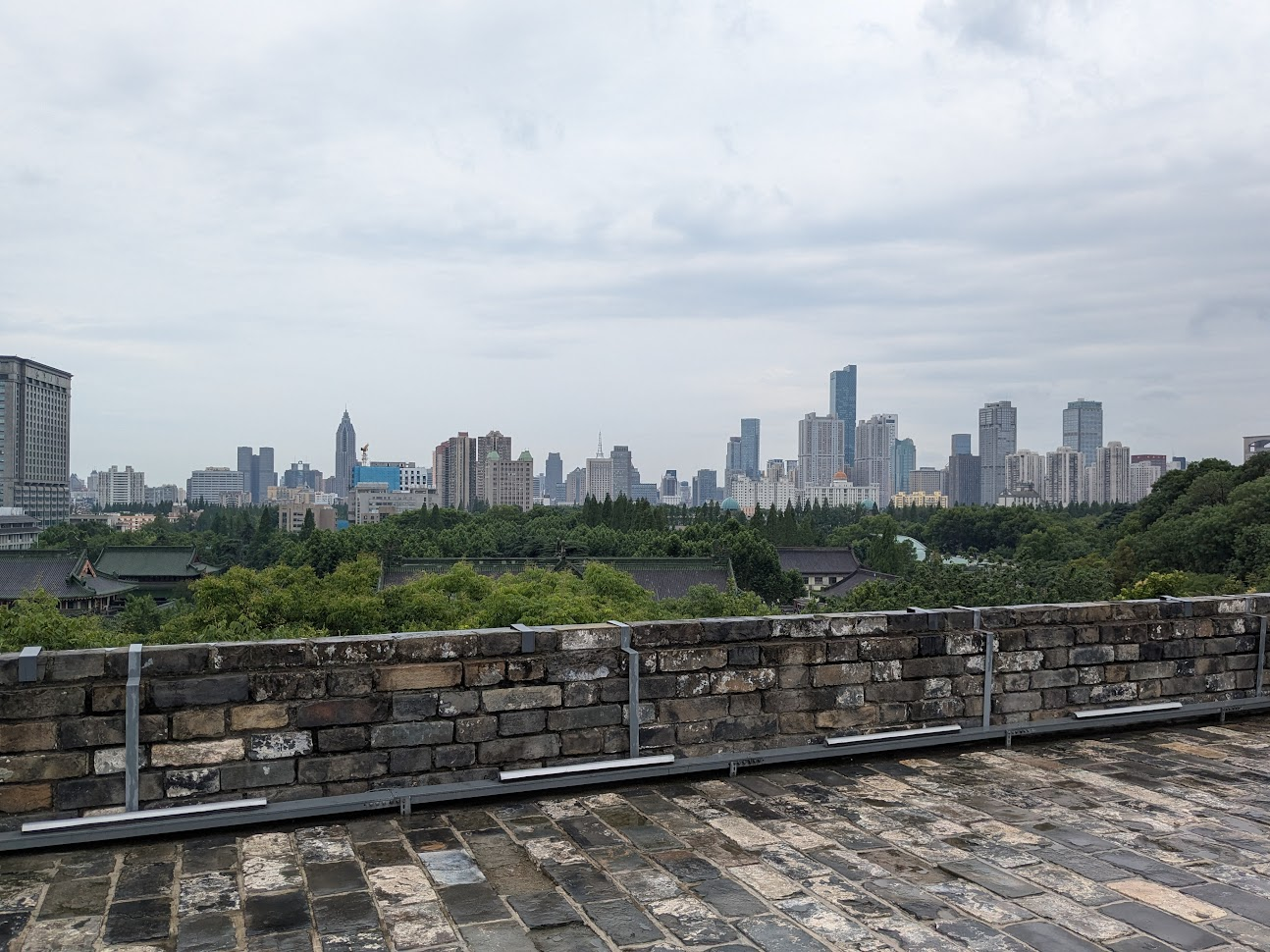
The city skyline, seen from the Nanjing City Wall
