= Qingliangshan Park =

Park in Nanjing, China

Coordinates: 32°03′07″N 118°45′24″E

Qingliangshan Park (Chinese: 清凉山公园)
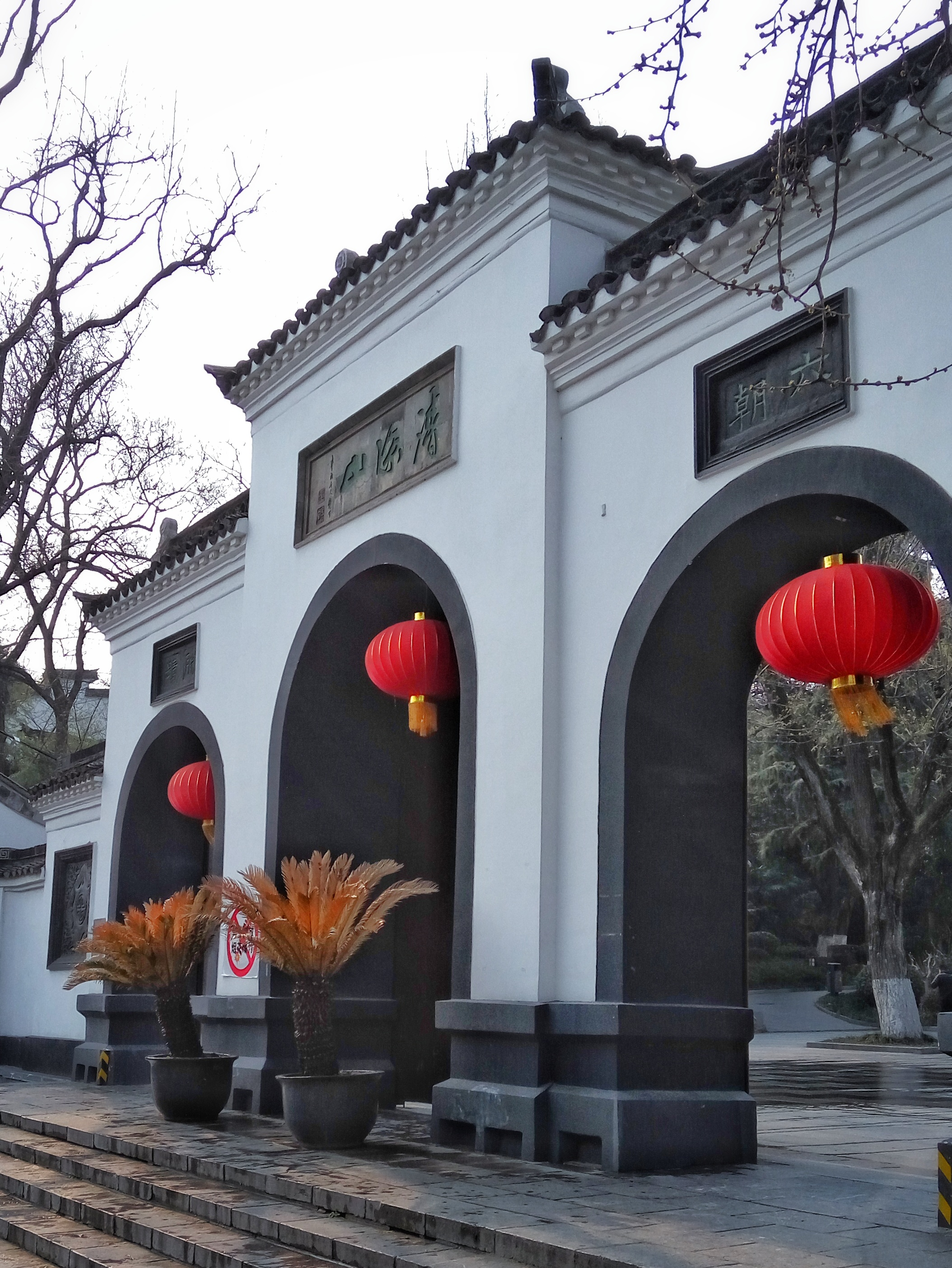
- Interactive map of Qingliangshan Park (Chinese: 清凉山公园)
- Location: 83 Guangzhou Road, Gulou District, Nanjing, China (鼓楼区广州路83号)
- Nanjing district map
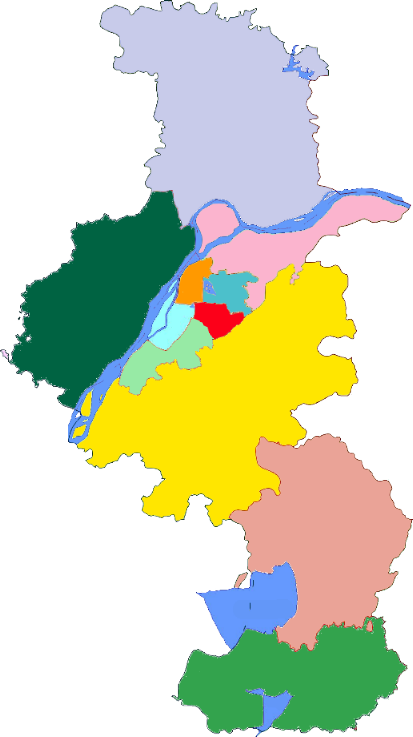
City Proper
1	Xuanwu
2	Qinhuai
3	Jianye
4	Gulou
5	Yuhuatai
6	Qixia
Suburban
7	Jiangning
8	Pukou
9	Luhe
Rural
10	Lishui
11	Gaochun

Qingliangshan Park (Chinese: (清凉山公园; lit. 'cooling hill'), is a 73 hectares (180 acres) park located in the Gulou District, Nanjing, China. It sits on Qingliang Hill, which is more than 100 metres (330 ft) high and 4 kilometres (2.5 miles) in radius.

== History ==
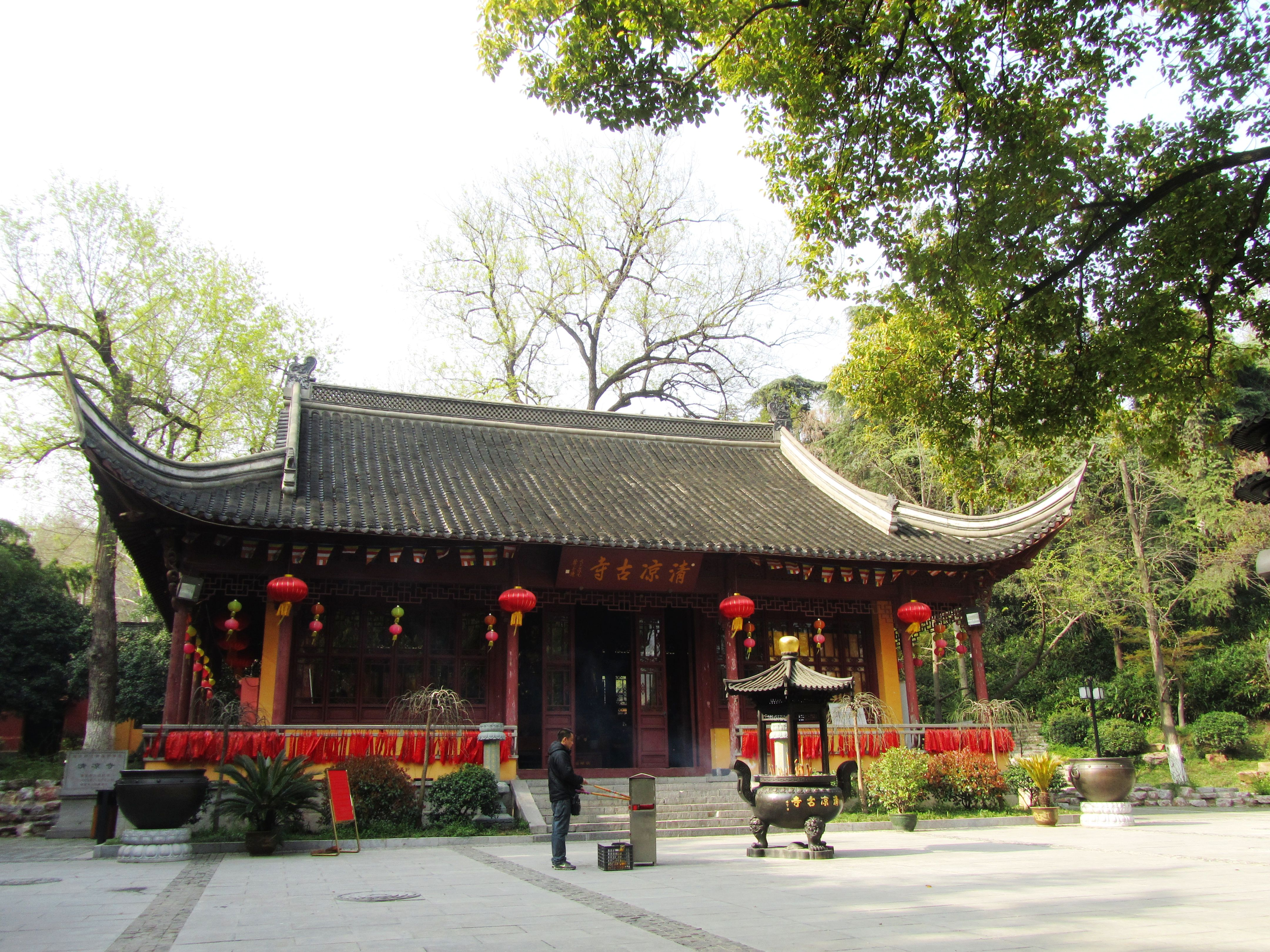
Qingliang Temple

Chinese Zen Master Fayan Wenyi (885–958), and founder of the Fayan school, taught at the Qingliang Temple. Juefan Huihong, also known as Qingliang (died 1128 AD), a great and well-known Zen Buddhist teacher in China, came to live at the Qingliang Temple. Tiantong Rujing (1163–1228), a noted Zen master, was an abbot at the temple.

During the Southern Tang dynasty, the area was an imperial summer resort. About 1500 AD, it was the Chongzheng Shuyuan academy. About that time, the temple was built for a Buddhist monastery name Qingliang Si was established for which the park is best known.

== Description ==
With many trees, it is sometimes called an "urban forest". The entrance of the park has three arch gates; The words “Qingliangshan” on the middle gate were written by Gong Xian. The main attractions are Qing Liang Temple, Chong Zheng College, and the Cui Wei Park.

The City of Nanjing has identified it as one of the top five parks in the city. Others are Mochou Lake Park, Xuanwu Lake, Wuchaomen Park and China Gate Castle Park, respectively.

== Transportation ==
The park is accessible within walking distance northwest of Hanzhongmen Station of Nanjing Metro.

== See also ==
- Stone City, adjacent to Qingliangshan Park
