= Stone City (Nanjing) =

Ancient city in Nanjing, China

Coordinates: 32°03′09″N 118°44′59″E

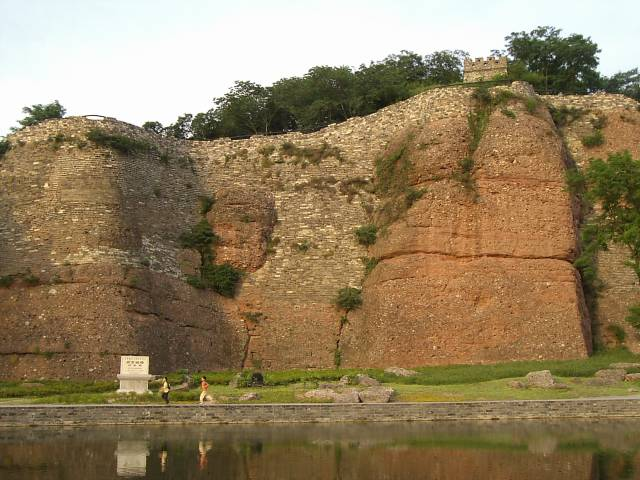
"Ghost-faced Wall" (Guiliancheng), part of the remnant Stone City wall.

The Stone City (Chinese: 石头城; pinyin: Shítóu Chéng) is the site of an ancient fortified city within Nanjing, Jiangsu province, China. Almost all of the original city is gone; all that remains are portions of the massive city wall.

== History ==
The original town was built during the Warring States period (475-221 BC) by people from the Chu kingdom. The city was expanded during the Later Han Dynasty and a wall, about 9,000 metres (5.6 mi) in circumference, was built around the Chu-era city.

Sun Quan (182–252), ruler of the Wu Kingdom, had what is now called Stone City built on a hill overlooking the Yangtze. It was used for naval training by General Zhou Yu (175–210). On a political visit to the area, the prime minister of the Shu Kingdom, Zhuge Liang (181–234) described the Qingliangshan Hill and Stone City area as "Zhongshan curling like a dragon and the Stone City crouching like a tiger".

The stone wall is all the remains from the ancient city. The ancient city is strongly enough associated with Nanjing that Nanjing itself is sometimes referred to as "Stone City".

== Park ==
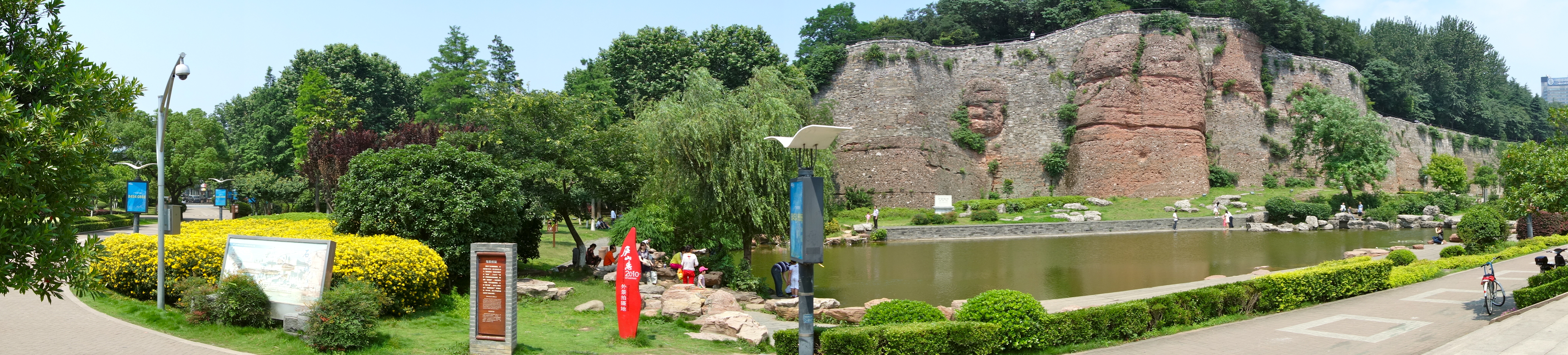
Nanjing city park

One of the most famous of its landmarks is the "Ghost-Faced Wall". The ancient city wall from Caochang Gate (Chinese: 草场门) to Qingliang Gate (Chinese: 清凉门) has been strengthened to prevent it from collapsing.

== Transportation ==
The area is accessible within walking distance north west of Hanzhongmen Station of Nanjing Metro.

== See also ==
- Defence Park (Nanjing), within Stone City
- Qingliangshan Park, adjacent to Stone City
