= Mochou Lake =

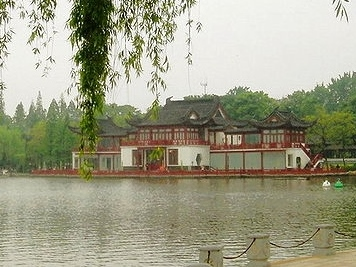

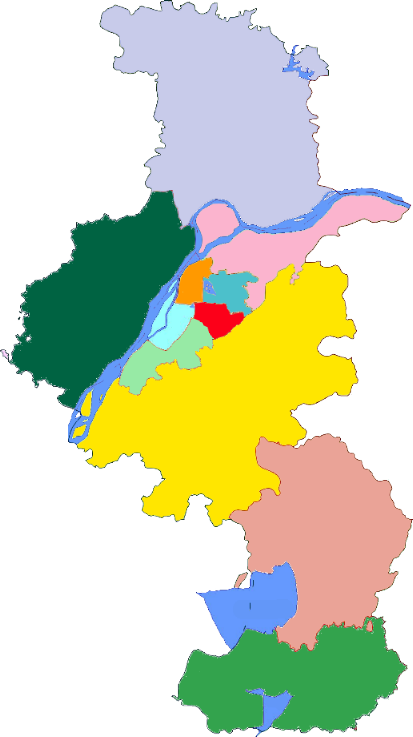
- Location within Nanjing Location within Jiangsu
- Location: Jianye District, Nanjing, Jiangsu
- Coordinates: 32.034512°N 118.757949°E
- Type: Lake
- Basin countries: China

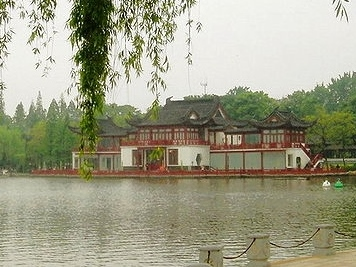
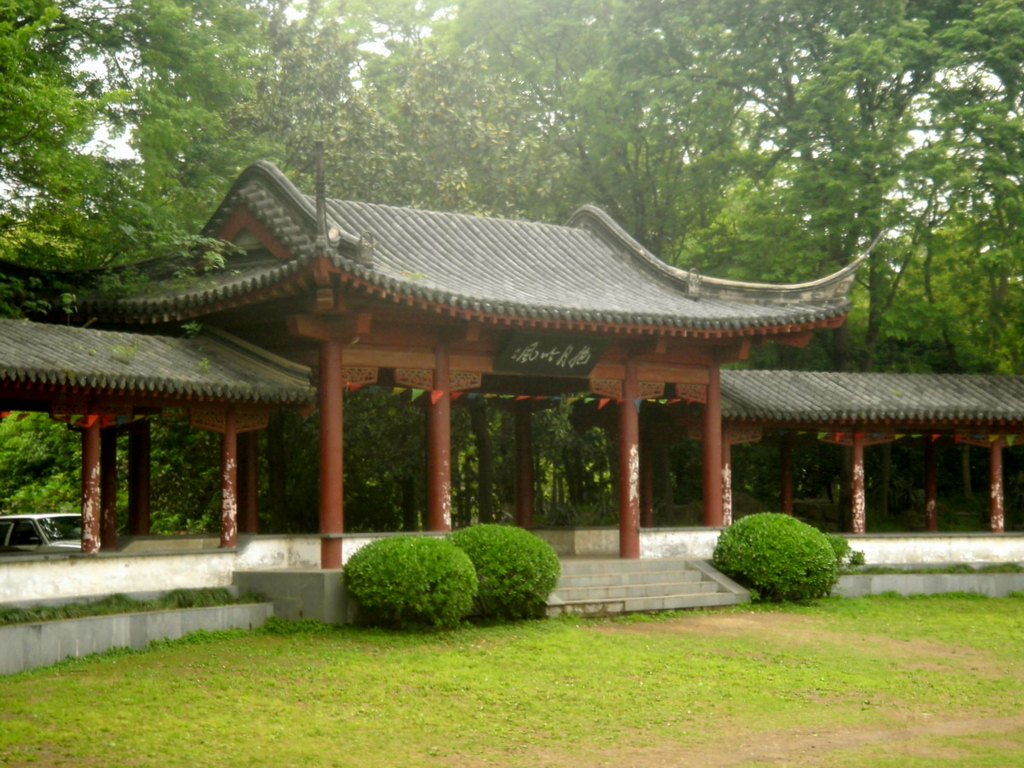
Mochou Lake and one of its pavilions

Mochou Lake (Chinese: 莫愁湖; pinyin: Mòchóu Hú; lit. 'No Worry Lake or No Unhappiness Lake') is located west of the Qinhuai River and Hanzhongmen Gate in Nanjing, inside Mochou Lake Park. The lake is named after Mochou, a legendary woman known for her beauty, versatility, virtue and loyalty. It was named Hengtang in ancient times, and also known as Stone City Lake. The lake park was owned by Zhu Yuanzhang, the first emperor of Ming dynasty, and bestowed to his general Xu Da. Since then, it has become a famous garden best known for its two-storied Shenggi Pavilion. Within the park are other pavilions, gardens, pools and a stunning rock display. It is noted for its architecture, collection of carved antique rosewood furniture and calligraphies. Visitors can take boats allow through the lotus blossomed lake.

== Tales of Mochou ==
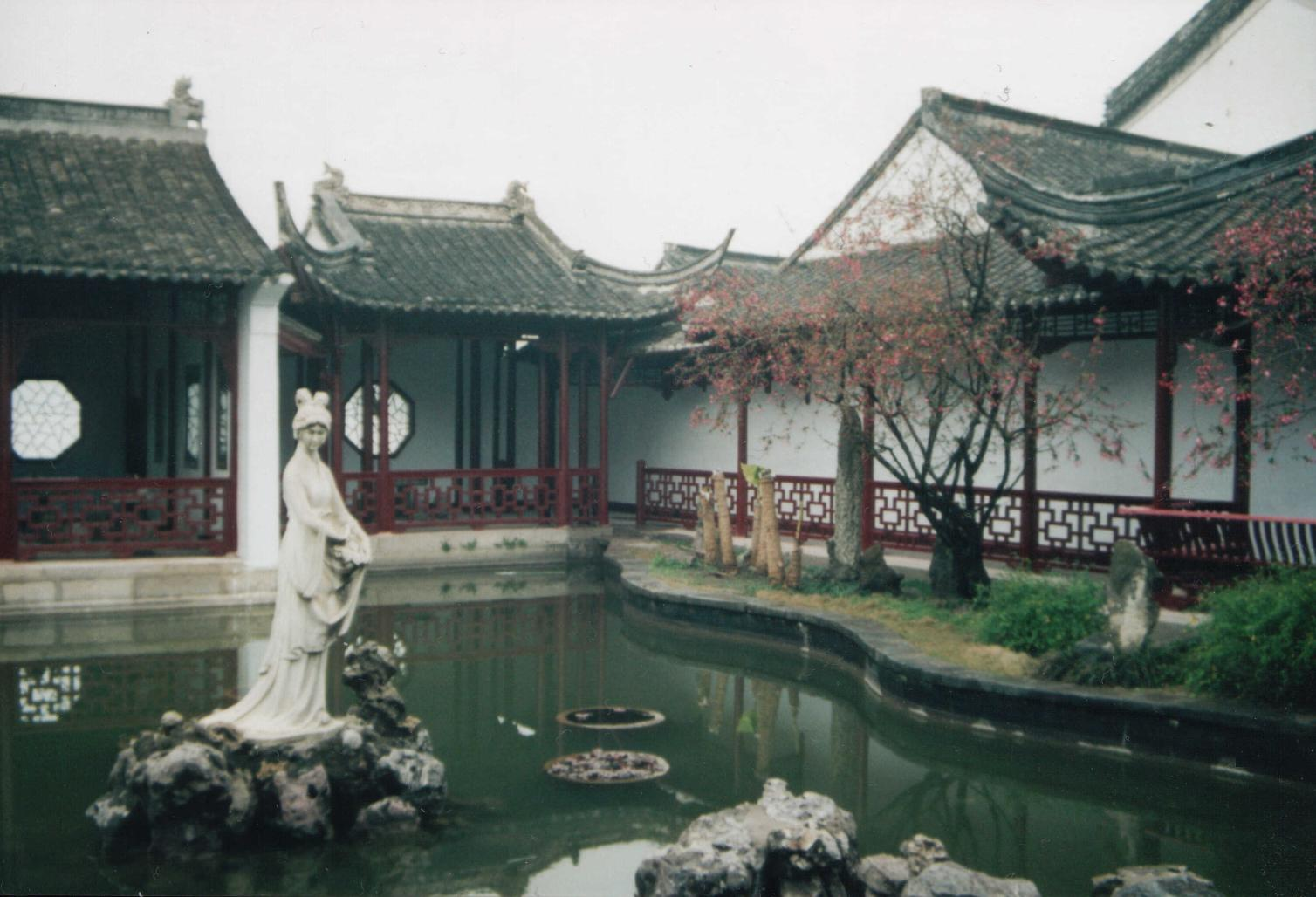
The statue of Mochou.

The name of Mochou Lake originated from a beautiful woman called Mochou, which means "do not worry" in Chinese, from the Liang dynasty who committed suicide to prevent herself from being married to an undesirable man.

Another tale has it that Mochou was a beautiful and virtuous woman who lived during the Northern and Southern Dynasties (386-589). She was married and had a child. Her happy life was disrupted when her husband was conscripted into the army. No news of her husband came even after months of his leaving for the front. Mochou grew sadder with each passing day. Finally, unable to shake off the grief of separating from her husband, she turned into a lake, with the hope of flowing to her husband. The lake was named after this woman, as a tribute to her unflagging love and devotion to her husband.

== History ==
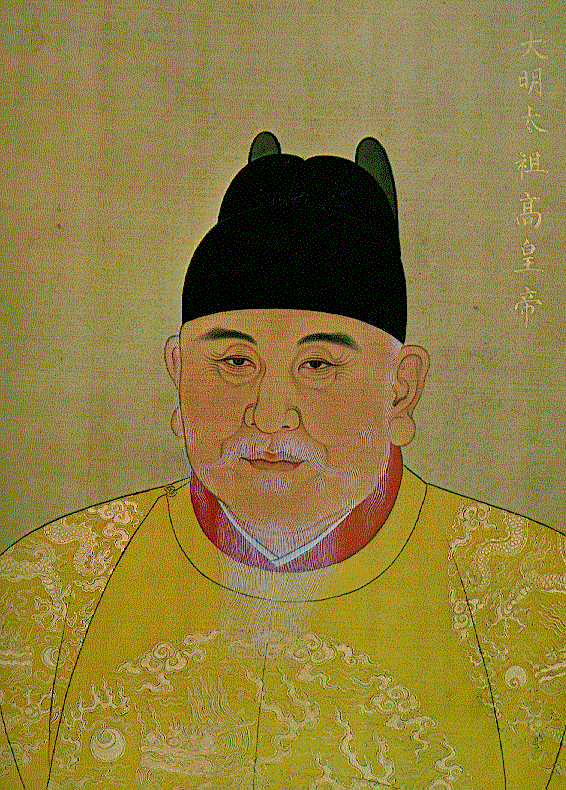
Emperor Zhu Yuanzhang

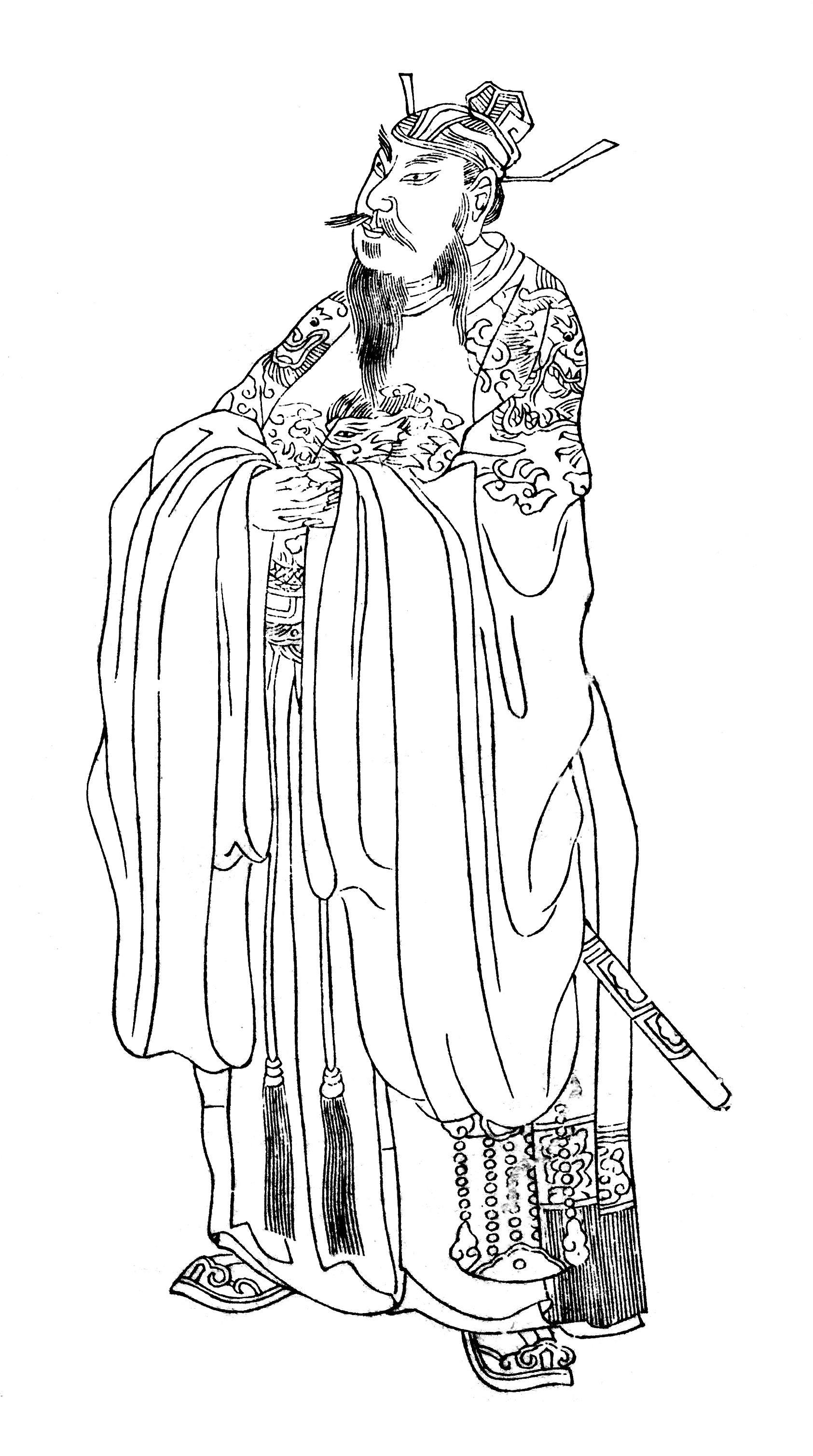
Xu Da

Since the early Ming Dynasty, Mochou Lake was gradually developed into a famous garden, which was bestowed to Xu Da by the Zhu Yuanzhang, the first emperor of Ming Dynasty, because he won his majesty while playing chess. Chinese folklore tells that the emperor and the general played the game regularly, and although the general was a great player, he always lost intentionally so as not to offend the emperor. Before long Emperor Taizu discovered the general's habit and ordered him to play normally. Needless to say, the general won. But while playing the general skillfully displayed the character 'wan sui,' meaning 'long life'. This feat pleased the emperor so much that he instantly gave Shengqi ('winning the game') Pavilion along with the Mochou Lake to his general During the following dynasty, this garden was extended several times and many other pavilions were added.

Since 1929 Mochou Lake has been known as Mochou Lake Park. In 1953, Mochou Lake Park underwent major restorations, and the waterside pavilion and ready for ferry pavilion were built. The statue of Mochou was remodeled as well.

== Park ==
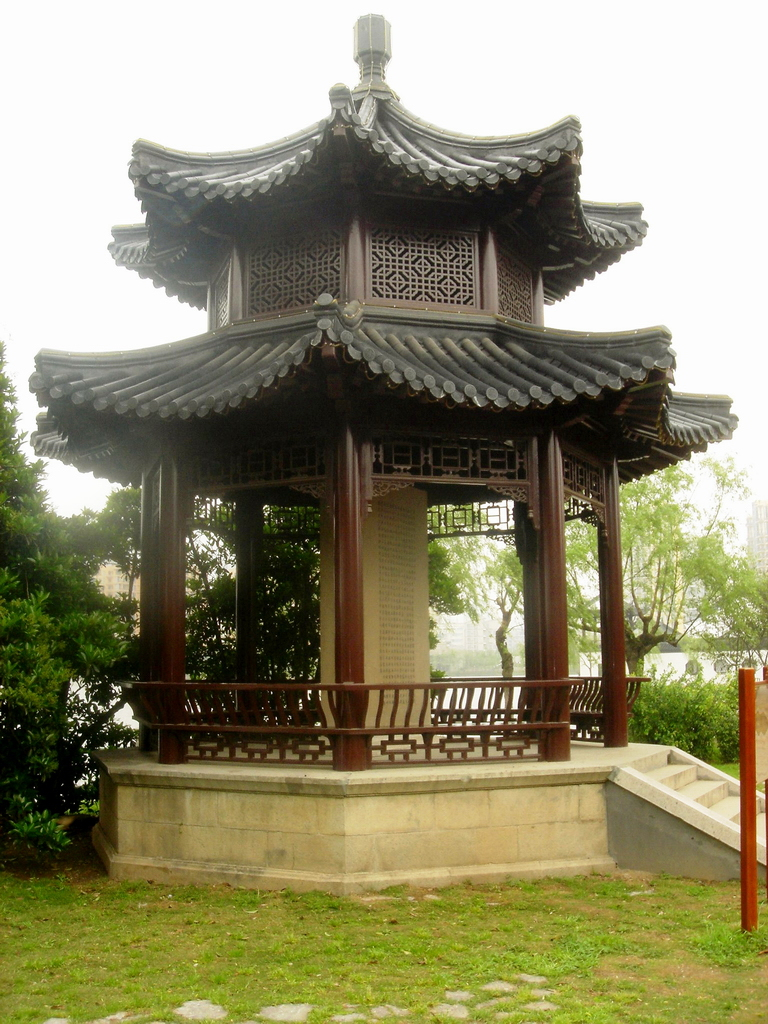
A pavilion on the lake's shore.

It lies outside Shuixi Gate of Nanjing City, with a total area of 47 hectares and a circumference of 5 km. In Qing Dynasty, it was a beautiful garden that was also famed as the first attraction of Nanjing. Mochou Lake was once part of Yangtze River. Later the channels of Yangtze River and Qin Huai River changed their carrying capacity and direction, so Mochou Lake gradually became a lake.

The park is a collection of pools, gardens, and pavilions, and a stunning rock display. Perhaps the most well-known feature of the park is the Shengqi Pavilion. It is a two-storied structure redolent of the austere architecture of ancient China. The first floor of the pavilion houses paintings and calligraphies created by famous artists. On the second floor the most conspicuous sight is of a picture depicting the emperor and Xu Da engrossed in a game of Weiqi that led to the emperor bestowing Shengqi ('winning the game') Pavilion along with the Mochou Lake to his general.

North of the Shengqi Pavilion lies Mochou's former house. It is called Yujin Hall, after yujin, which means white cardamom. The hall is partitioned by a pond in which grow lilies. The pond is adorned by a 2-metre (6.6 ft) marble statue of Mochou, which stands in the middle of the pond. The statue's sorrowful expression is a reminder of that woman's tragic life. The pond is surrounded by cloistered pavilions.

A large collection of ornately carved antique rosewood Chinese furniture is exhibited in one of the courtyards.

The lake is situated behind the pavilion. Lotuses cover the lake, and when they are in bloom, they present a wonderful sight. There is an island in the lake's middle that can be reached by boat.

== Events ==
Mochou Lake Park celebrates Duanwu Festival each year with a dragon boat race.

== See also ==
- List of Chinese gardens
