= Li Leishi =

Chinese scientist

- 黎磊石
- Born: 26 October 1926; Changsha County, Hunan, China
- Died: 16 March 2010 (aged 83); Nanjing, Jiangsu, China
- Education: Nanchang Medical College
- Scientific career
- Fields: Renal disease
- Workplaces: Nanjing University Medical School

Li Leishi (Chinese: 黎磊石; pinyin: Lí Lěishí; 26 October 1926 – 16 March 2010) was a Chinese renal specialist, and an academician of the Chinese Academy of Engineering.

He was a member of the 8th National Committee of the Chinese People's Political Consultative Conference.

== Biography ==
Li was born in Changsha County, Hunan, on 26 October 1926, to Li Putang (黎溥棠), a teacher, and Zhou Xia (周霞), a housewife. He was the youngest of five children. Both his elder brothers Li Ao and Li Jieshou were also academicians of the Chinese Academy of Engineering. Because of his father's job transfer, he successively studied in Shanghai, Nanjing and Hangzhou. After his father died in 1937, Li studied at Guangyi Middle School (广益中学) in his home-city Changsha. At the end of the year, due to the impact of the Second Sino-Japanese War, Li's family moved several times in Hunan, passing through Changsha, Anhua County, Loudi, Changning and other places. In April 1941, he returned to Guangyi Middle School with his elder brother Li Jieshou. In 1943, he was admitted to National Zhongzheng Medical College (renamed Nanchang Medical College in 1949), where he majored in clinical medicine. After graduating in 1949, he became a resident surgeon of Nanjing Central Hospital.

In April 1963, Li rose to become vice president of Nanjing University Medical School, and held that office until April 1986. He concurrently served as director of the PLA Nephrology Institute from April 1964 to April 1986. He joined the Chinese Communist Party (CCP) in April 1981. In May 1986, he was chosen as vice president of the Clinical College of Nanjing University Medical School, a position he held until March 2010.

On the morning of 16 March 2010, Li jumped from his home on the 14th Floor of Beijing West Road in Nanjing, at the age of 83.

== Honours and awards ==
- 1985 State Science and Technology Progress Award (Third Class) for the study on diagnosis and treatment of glomerulonephritis
- 1988 State Science and Technology Progress Award (Second Class) for the immunopathological study and clinical application of glomerular diseases
- 1991 State Science and Technology Progress Award (Second Class) for the study on immunopathogenesis of IgA nephritis
- 1991 State Science and Technology Progress Award (Second Class) for the study on the treatment of lupus nephritis
- 1993 State Science and Technology Progress Award (Second Class) for the mechanism and effect of rhubarb on delaying chronic renal failure
- 1994 Member of the Chinese Academy of Engineering (CAE)
- 2002 Science and Technology Progress Award of the Ho Leung Ho Lee Foundation
