= Li Jieshou =

Chinese surgeon (1924–2023)

- 黎介寿
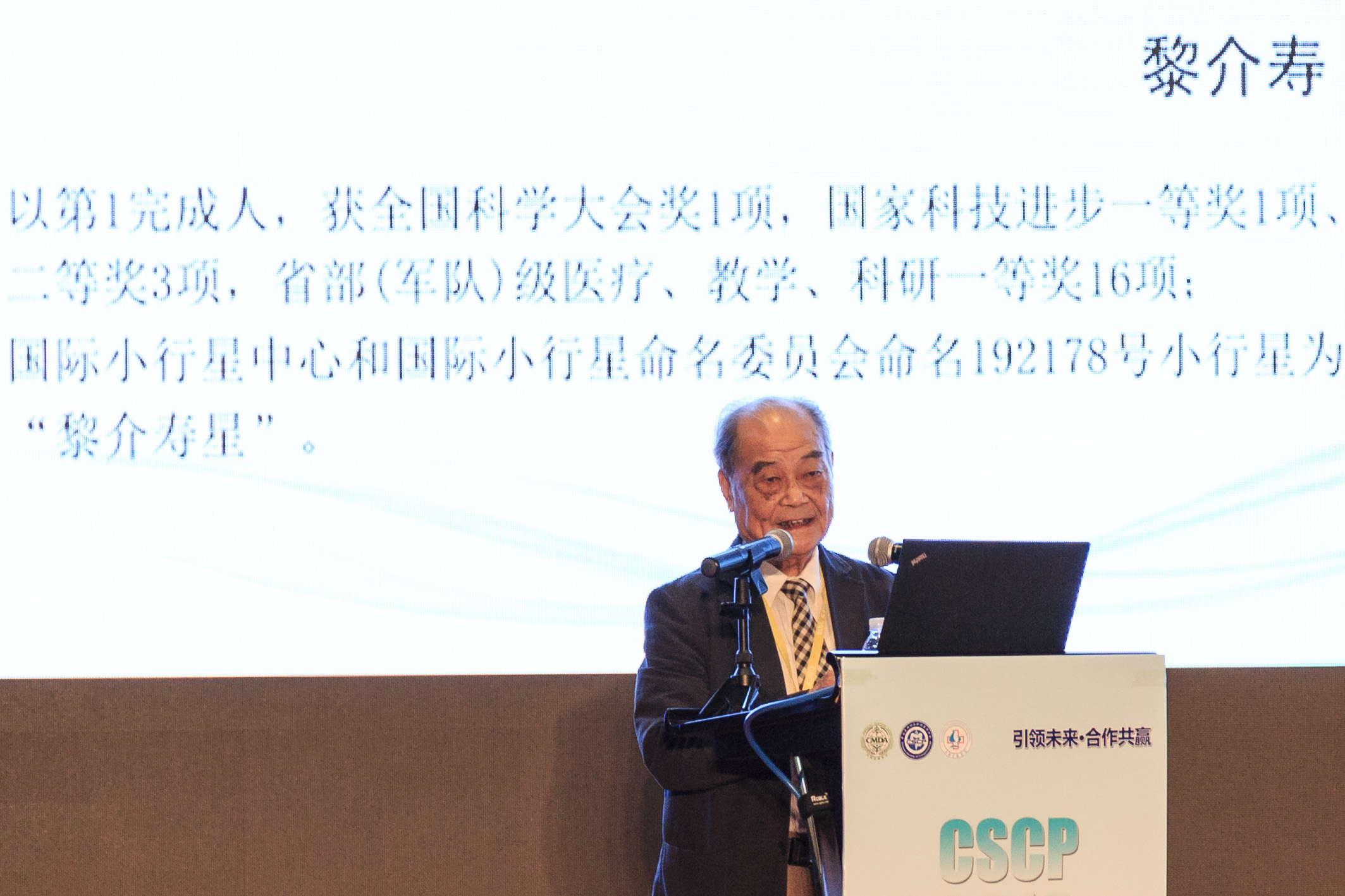
- Li in 2016
- Born: 13 September 1924; Liuyang County, Hunan, China
- Died: 30 January 2023 (aged 98); Nanjing, Jiangsu, China
- Education: Nanchang Medical College
- Spouse: Cheng Yingshi
- Scientific career
- Fields: Surgery
- Workplaces: Jinling Hospital affiliated to Nanjing University Medical School

Chinese name
- Simplified Chinese: 黎介寿
- Traditional Chinese: 黎介壽
Transcriptions
Standard Mandarin
- Hanyu Pinyin: Lí Jièshòu

Li Jieshou (Chinese: 黎介寿; 13 September 1924 – 30 January 2023) was a Chinese surgeon, and an academician of the Chinese Academy of Engineering.

== Biography ==
Li was born in Liuyang County (now Liuyang), Hunan, on 13 September 1924, to Li Putang (黎溥棠), a teacher, and Zhou Xia (周霞), a housewife. He was the second of five children. Both his elder brother Li Ao and younger brother Li Leishi were also academicians of the Chinese Academy of Engineering. His family moved to Shanghai in 1931, where he studied at Pushi Road Primary School (蒲石路小学). In 1933, his father was transferred to Nanjing, and Li attended Youfu West Street Primary School (游府西街小学). A year later, his father was transferred again to Hangzhou, until his death in 1937, the year the Lugouqiao Incident broke out. After his father died, Li studied at Guangyi Middle School (广益中学) in his home-city Changsha. At the end of the year, due to the impact of the Second Sino-Japanese War, Li's family moved several times in Hunan, passing through Changsha, Anhua County, Loudi, Changning and other places. In April 1941, he returned to Guangyi Middle School with his younger brother. In 1943, he was admitted to National Zhongzheng Medical College (renamed Nanchang Medical College in 1949), where he majored in clinical medicine. After graduating in 1949, he became a resident surgeon of Nanjing Central Hospital.

After founding of the Communist State, in June 1950, Li became a surgeon of the East China Military Region Hospital.

In 1951, Li was chosen as deputy captain of the Second Operating Team of the Nanjing Counter-American and Aid Korea Volunteer Medical Corps, and came to the rear hospital in Changchun, to treat the wounded transported from the Korean battlefield.

Li returned to the East China Military Region Hospital in June 1953. He enlisted in the People's Liberation Army (PLA) in April 1963.

In May 1966 during the Cultural Revolution, Li was dismissed from the post of deputy director of the First Department of Foreign Affairs and became a general surgeon. In October 1968, he was labeled as a "reactionary academic authority" and was sent to do farm works in a village in Anhui.

After the Cultural Revolution, in December 1978, Li became director of the Second Department of Surgery of the General Hospital of the Nanjing Military Region. He joined the Chinese Communist Party (CCP) in March 1979. He rose to become vice president of the General Hospital of the Nanjing Military Region in September 1983. In September 1993, he was employed as vice president of the Clinical School of Nanjing University Medical School.

In 2014, the asteroid with the international number of 192178 which was first discovered internationally by the Zijinshan Observatory in March 2007, was officially named "Li Jieshou Asteroid".

On 30 January 2023, Li died of an illness in Nanjing, Jiangsu, at the age of 98.

== Personal life ==
Li married Cheng Yingshi (程颖士) in August 1954.

== Honours and awards ==
- 1985 State Science and Technology Progress Award (Second Class) for the study on the treatment of external intestinal fistula
- 1995 State Science and Technology Progress Award (Third Class) for the study on cholestasis caused by total parenteral nutrition
- 1996 Member of the Chinese Academy of Engineering (CAE)
- 1997 Science and Technology Progress Award of the Ho Leung Ho Lee Foundation
- 2010 State Science and Technology Progress Award (First Class) for the treatment of intestinal dysfunction
- 2019 Victory Meritorious Medal
