= Grace Louise Bauer =

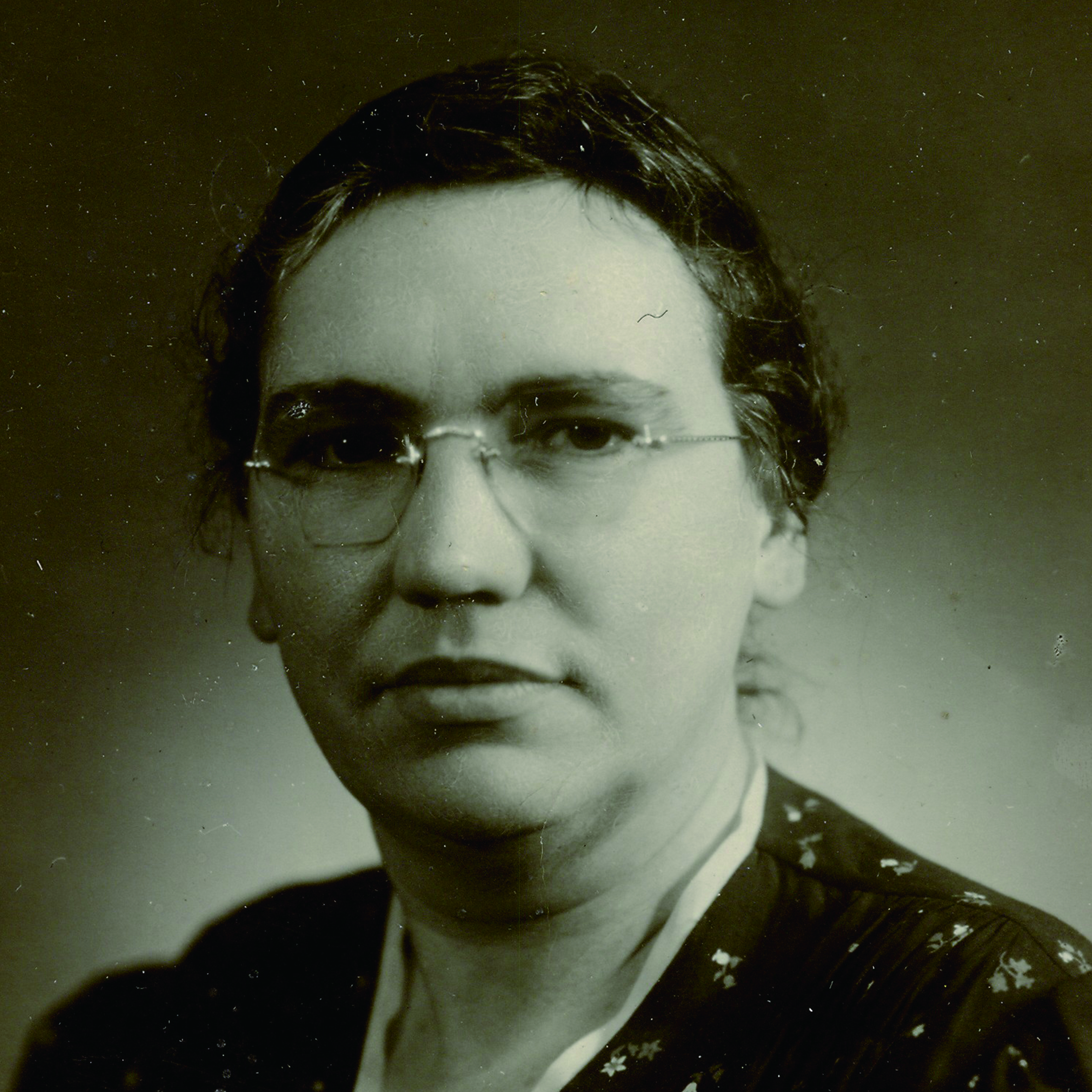
Grace Louise Bauer

Grace Louise Bauer (January 20, 1896 – July 29, 1976, Chinese: 格蕾丝·鲍尔, 鲍恩典) is an American medical missionary of Churches of Christ. She supported the operation of Drum Tower Hospital during the Nanjing Massacre.

== Biography ==
Bauer was born on January 20, 1896, in Baltimore, Maryland. She studied at Johns Hopkins and undertook medical training as a laboratory technician at Howard A. Kelly Hospital in Baltimore, where she was employed for three years. In 1919, she conferred with Dr. John Elias Williams, vice president of the University of Nanking and a staff member at Drum Tower Hospital, to deliberate on prospects for medical missionary endeavors funded by the Churches of Christ.

Subsequently, in 1919, Bauer journeyed to Nanjing, where she commenced her tenure at Drum Tower Hospital. She was assigned the responsibility of educating local laboratory workers and supervising the hospital's laboratory department. Alongside her medical duties, she assumed administrative and instructional roles at Drum Tower Church. During the harsh occupation of Nanjing by Japanese forces, Bauer facilitated the continued operation of Drum Tower Hospital by overseeing its finances and supporting general hospital functions. During the Nanjing Massacre, she procured and allocated sustenance to both hospitalized and displaced civilians.

Bauer stayed in Nanjing until October 1941, when she returned to the United States. She recommenced her position as a laboratory technician at the Johns Hopkins Hospital in Baltimore until her retirement. Grace Bauer died on July 29, 1976.
