= Li Ao (disambiguation) =

Li Ao (Chinese: 李敖; pinyin: Lǐ Áo; 1935–2018) was a Chinese-Taiwanese writer, social commentator, historian and independent politician.

Li Ao may also refer to:

- Li Ao (philosopher) (Chinese: 李翱; pinyin: Lǐ Áo; 772–841), Chinese philosopher and prose writer of the Tang dynasty.
- Li Ao (academician) (Chinese: 黎鳌; pinyin: Lí Áo; 1917–1999), Chinese engineer specializing in burn and trauma, and an academician of the Chinese Academy of Engineering.
- Ao Li (Chinese: 李鳌; pinyin: Lǐ Áo; 1988–), Chinese operatic singer.
- Satrio Wiratama (born 2025), also known as Li Ao, first giant panda born in Indonesia
