= Xi'anmen station =

Nanjing Metro station

Coordinates: 32°02′23″N 118°48′20″E

Xi'anmen 西安门
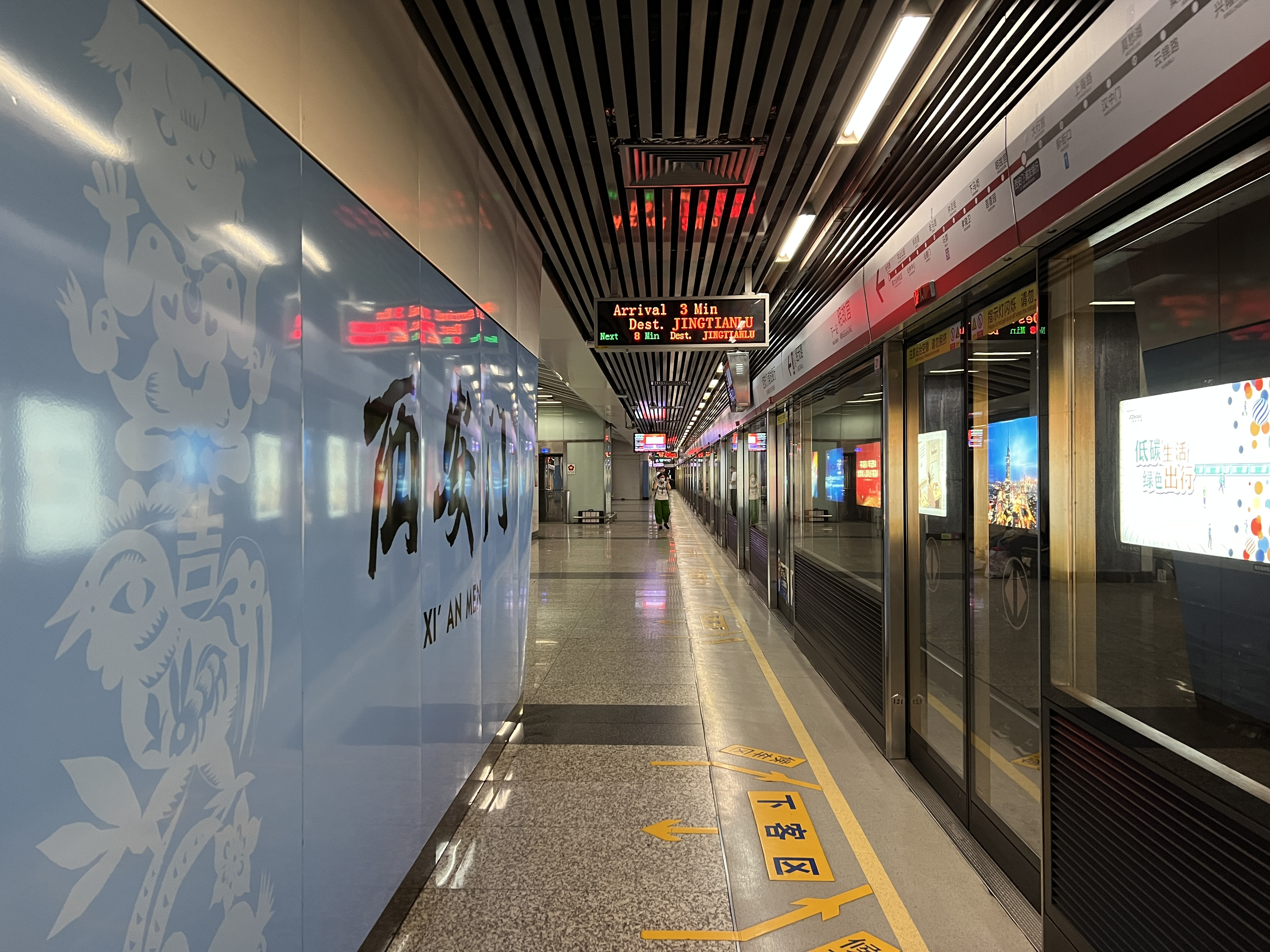

General information
- Location: East Zhongshan Road and Middle Longpan Road; Xuanwu District / Qinhuai District border, Nanjing, Jiangsu; China
- Operated by: Nanjing Metro Co. Ltd.
- Line: Line 2

Construction
- Structure type: Underground

Other information
- Station code: 217

History
- Opened: 28 May 2010

Services
Preceding station	Nanjing Metro	Following station
Daxinggong towards Yuzui	Line 2	Minggugong towards Jingtianlu
Location

Xi'anmen Station (simplified Chinese: 西安门站; traditional Chinese: 西安門站; pinyin: Xī'ānmén Zhàn), formerly Yixianqiao station (逸仙桥站; 逸仙橋站; Yìxiānqiáo Zhàn) during planning until 2007, is a station of Line 2 of the Nanjing Metro. It is named after the former gate known as Xi'anmen of the Ming Palace, and started operations on 28 May 2010 along with the rest of Line 2.

== Around the station ==
- Nanjing General Hospital of Nanjing Military Command
