= Nanjing General Hospital of People's Liberation Army =

- Eastern Theater Command

Geography
- Location: Nanjing, Jiangsu Province, China

History
- Founded: 1929

The Nanjing General Hospital of People's Liberation Army (NGH; Chinese: 中国人民解放军南京总医院), formerly Nanjing General Hospital of Nanjing Military Command (Chinese: 中国人民解放军南京军区南京总医院), or Nanjing General Hospital, The Military General Hospital, is also known as Jinling Hospital (formally Jinling Hospital of the Medical School of Nanjing University) which used to be Central Hospital. NGH is located at 305 Zhongshan East Road, Nanjing, Jiangsu Province, China. It is a large comprehensive teaching hospital integrating medical services with teaching and research.

NGH is the Department of Clinical Medicine of the Medical School, Nanjing University. It is also the teaching clinic of universities like the Second Military Medical University. The hospital offers a special medical program which serves as the basis of human resource training for the military command's health system. NGH is the first batch of the national "three levels of first-class hospital", According to the statistics by Institute of S&T Information of the Ministry of Science and Technology of China, the hospital has ranked in the top 10 among hospitals nationwide in 10 successive years, and has been second for four years on end.

== History ==
The history of Central Hospital can be traced back to the Central Model Army Hospital established in 1929. In January 1930, the Executive Yuan of National Government renamed it into the National Central Hospital, with funds donated by Aw Boon Haw (Chinese:胡文虎), a Burmese Chinese businessman. It was the first modern national hospital in China created by the Chinese people with their own efforts and the first national Western hospital nationwide established by the Chinese people. Liu Ruiheng (Chinese:刘瑞恒), a former minister of the Health Department of National Government, was made the hospital's first director. The Central Hospital used to be closely connected to the Medical School of the Central University in Nanjing. For example, Qi Shounan (Chinese:戚寿南), the Dean of the Medical School of Central University served concurrently as the general director of the National Central Hospital. During the Second Sino-Japanese War, the Central Hospital was moved to Changsha, then to Guiyang, and finally to Chongqing in 1941. The Chongqing Central Hospital was initially the attached teaching hospital of the National Shanghai Medical School (whose predecessor was formerly the Medical School of Central University in Shanghai). After the war, a part of the National Central Hospital moved back to Nanjing, a part remained in Chongqing and a part moved to Guangzhou. In 1950, the Nanjing Central Hospital was renamed the Hospital of the East China Military Command (Before long, the Medical School of Nanjing University, originally the Medical School of Central University, was renamed the Medical School of the East China Military Command, whose teaching hospital therefore being the Hospital of the East China Military Command), which was renamed the General Hospital of Nanjing Military Command in 1955 and the Nanjing General Hospital of Nanjing Military Command in 1986.

Subsequently, the National Central Hospital evolved into the Nanjing General Hospital (the former Nanjing Central Hospital), the Chongqing Southwest Hospital (the former Chongqing Central Hospital), and then the Guangdong General Hospital (the former Guangzhou Central Hospital).

== Historical preservation ==
The former site of the Central Hospital, now under special protection of the Nanjing Government, is in the architectural style of the time of the Republic of China. It is located at 305 Zhongshan East Road, and is now part of the NGH. The construction was designed by Yang Tingbao (Chinese:杨廷宝), an architecture professor at Central University (later renamed Nanjing University) and supervised by Yang Mingding (Chinese:杨铭鼎), a public health engineer.

== Human resources training ==
NGH is responsible for the hands-on education task of teaching medical post-graduates and doctorates (including those who are accepted as medical undergraduates) of the Nanjing University Medical School, and the five-year medical students of Southern Medical University, (the former First Military Medical University) and the Second Military Medical University in clinical studies. Its special medical programs bear the responsibility for human resources training of some health professions of the whole Chinese People's Liberation Army and Nanjing Military Command. Meanwhile, NGH is responsible for the internship and thesis supervision of trainees from over ten medical schools such as Nanjing Medical University, Medical School of Southeast University and the Medical School of Jiangsu University.

== Transportation ==
The hospital is accessible within walking distance east of Xi'anmen Station of Nanjing Metro.
