= Nanjing Drum Tower Hospital =

Nanjing Drum Tower Hospital Chinese: 南京鼓樓醫院
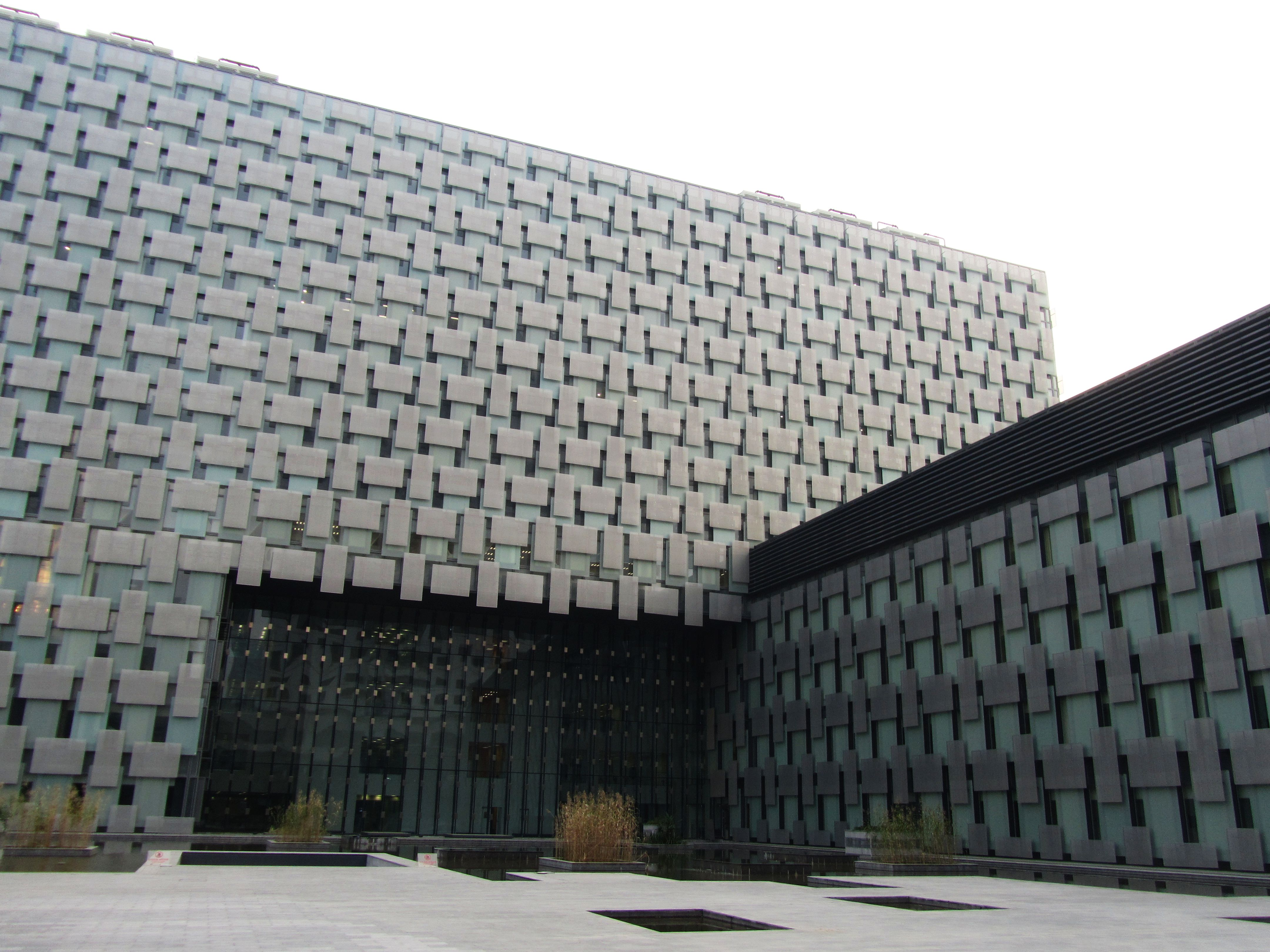
- New South Expansion Building of the Hospital

Geography
- Location: No. 321 Zhongshan Road, Gulou District, Nanjing City, Jiangsu Province, China

Organisation
- Type: General Hospital (Grade A)
- Affiliated university: Nanjing University Medical School

Services
- Beds: 3,500

History
- Founded: 1892

Links
- Website: glcs.demo.71nc.com/en/index.aspx

Nanjing Drum Tower Hospital, shortly Drum Tower Hospital or Gulou Hospital, is an affiliated hospital of the Nanjing University Medical School. Founced in 1892 as one of the earliest Western medical hospitals in China, Nanjing Drum Tower Hospital is now a comprehensive tertiary hospital with 3,500 patient beds and over 6,000 employees. Its leading research areas include Oncology and Carcinogenesis, Clinical Sciences, Medical Biotechnology, Cardiovascular Medicine and Haematology, and Pharmacology and Pharmaceutical Sciences. In addition, the hospital has active exchanges and cooperations with international medical institutions.

== History ==
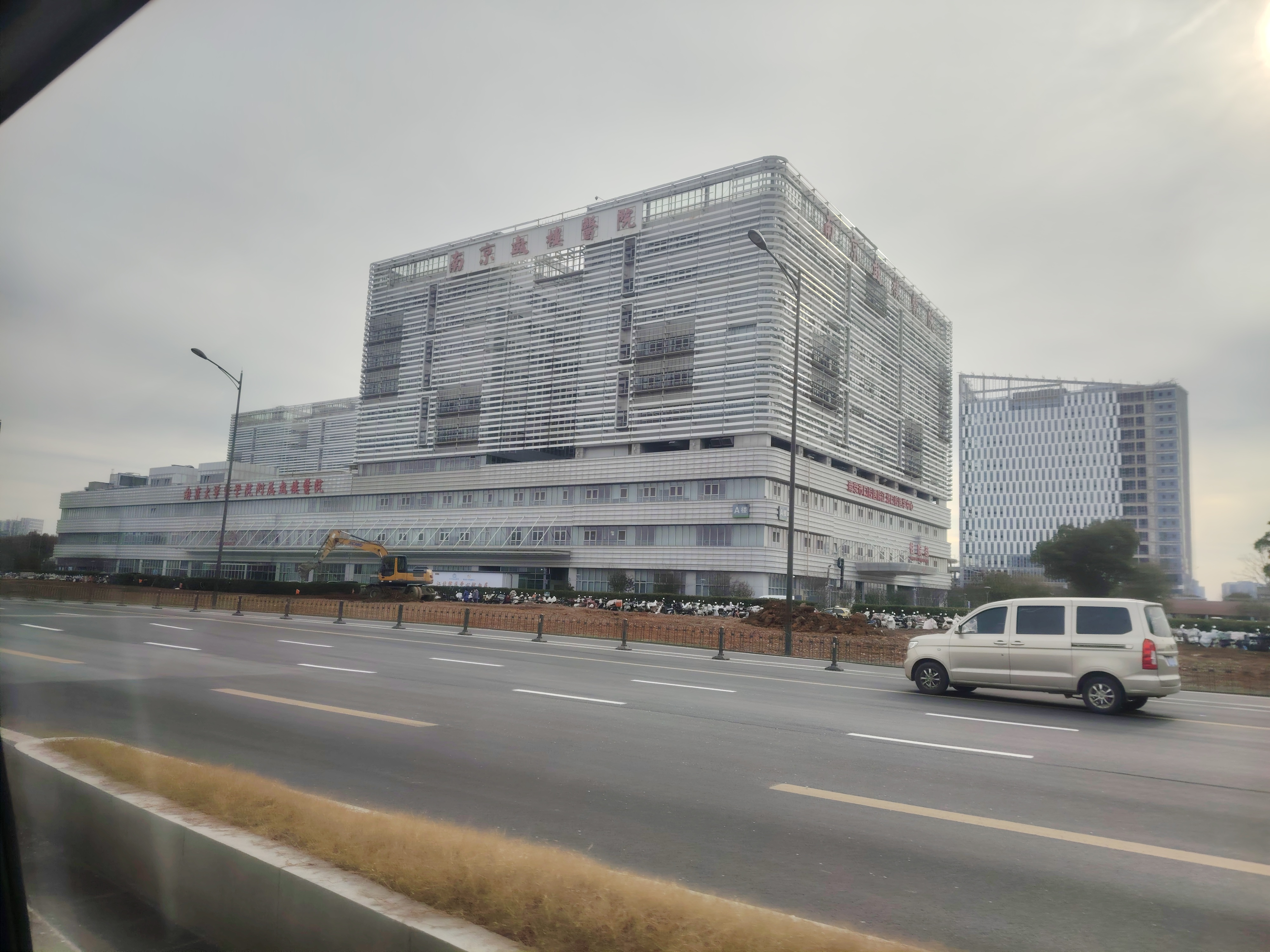
Gulou Hospital Jiangbei Branch

In 1886, William Edward Macklin, a Canadian missionary and medical doctor of the American Christian Church, was sent to China to carry out missionary and medical activities in Nanjing. He then purchased a piece of land near the Drum Tower to build a hospital. In 1892, a two-storey Western-style building was completed, which was called the "Macklin Hospital" by local people. The building was in the style of the American colonial era, with exposed brick walls, constructed of blue bricks and inlaid with red bricks. The facade featured two rows of round arched windows, and a row of double-pitched dormer windows on the sloping roof.

Macklin Hospital subsequently became a teaching hospital of the University of Nanking. In 1913, it was officially united with the University of Nanking to form the University of Nanking Medical College.

Between 1917 and 1924, Drum Tower Hospital was expanded with wards, operating rooms, and office buildings. Its name changed several times: in 1942, it was renamed the "Nanjing Medical Class Drum Tower Hospital" of the Japanese Association; in 1951, it became a public hospital and was renamed "Nanjing People's Drum Tower Hospital"; in 1972, it was renamed "Nanjing Drum Tower Hospital". In 1987, it became an affiliated hospital of Nanjing University School of Medicine. In 2014, it was officially named "Nanjing Drum Tower Hospital".

In 2004, Nanjing Third Hospital (formerly Nanjing Railway Central Hospital) merged into Drum Tower Hospital. In 2012, the Drum Tower Hospital South Expansion Project, with an investment of 1.1 billion yuan, was completed, increasing the hospital's beds to 2,400 and the total building area to 300,000 m^{2} (3,200,000 sq ft). The newly built outpatient and emergency building has a helicopter landing pad on its roof, allowing injured and sick personnel to be directly transported to the emergency room for rescue by helicopter.

In 2020, the Drum Tower Hospital was listed among the "Medical institutions that received the most public satisfaction".

In August 2025, Nanjing Drum Tower Hospital became the first medical institution in China to obtain World Stroke Organization's certification. On December 26 of the same year, the Nanjing Drum Tower Hospital Clinical Medical Research Institute was officially unveiled and put into use.

== Present situation ==
The Drum Tower Hospital is a major national medical center, managing 32 clinical departments. It is a comprehensive Grade A tertiary hospital with 3,500 patient beds and over 6,000 employees, and famous for anesthesiology, cardiology, cardio-thoracic, endocrinology, gastroenterology, hematology, hepatobiliary surgery, immunology, obstetrics and gynecology, oncology, orthopedics, pathology, respiratory, spine surgery and urology, etc. Its leading research areas include Oncology and Carcinogenesis, Clinical Sciences, Medical Biotechnology, Cardiovascular Medicine and Haematology, and Pharmacology and Pharmaceutical Sciences.

The hospital also has active academic exchanges and cooperative research programs with international medical institutions in the United States, Japan, Australia, Germany, Canada and Hong Kong.

== Buildings ==
The former site of the Macklin Hospital on the main campus of the hospital was listed among the national key cultural relics protection units in 2019.

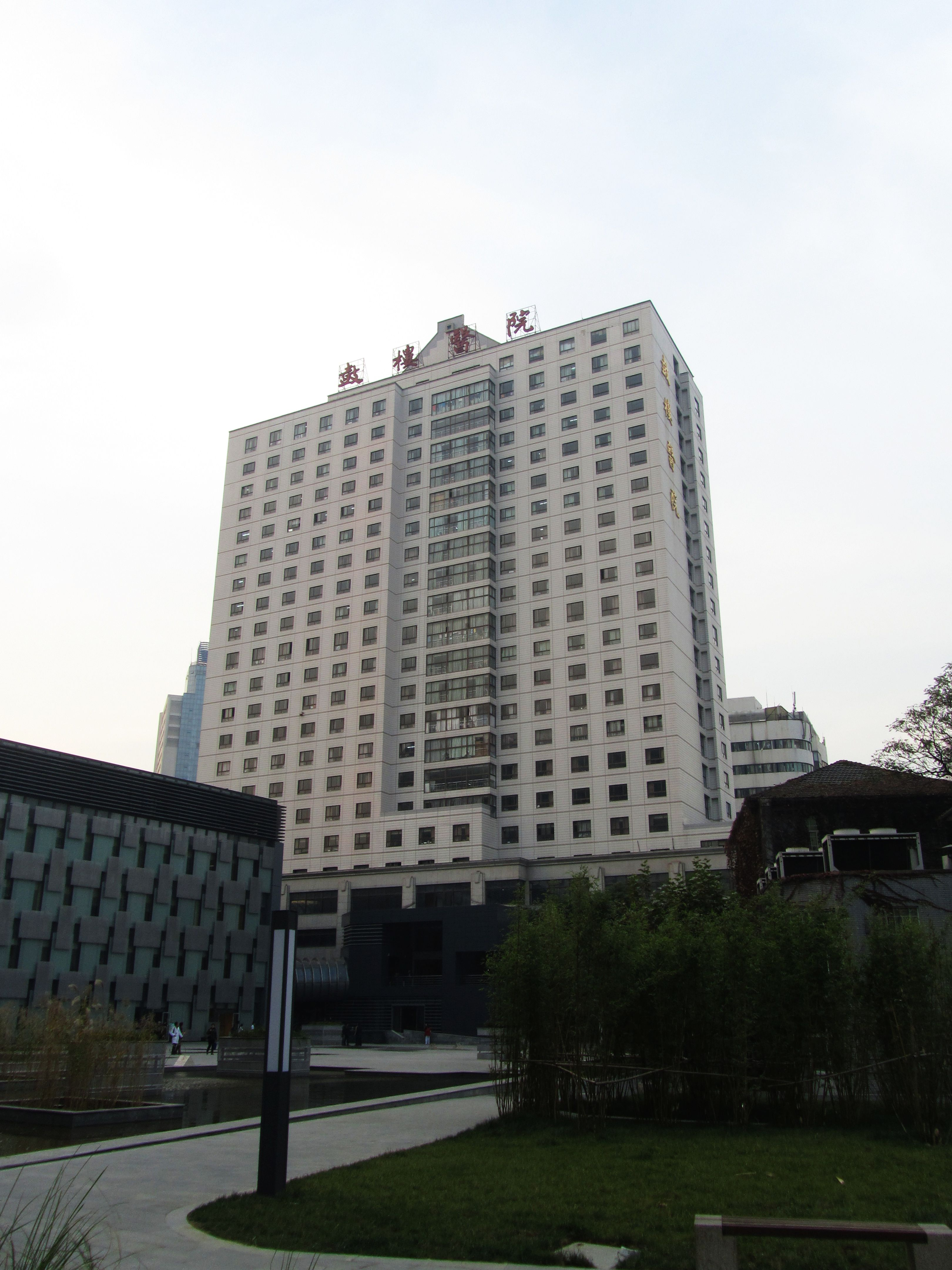
Phase II of Drum Tower Hospital

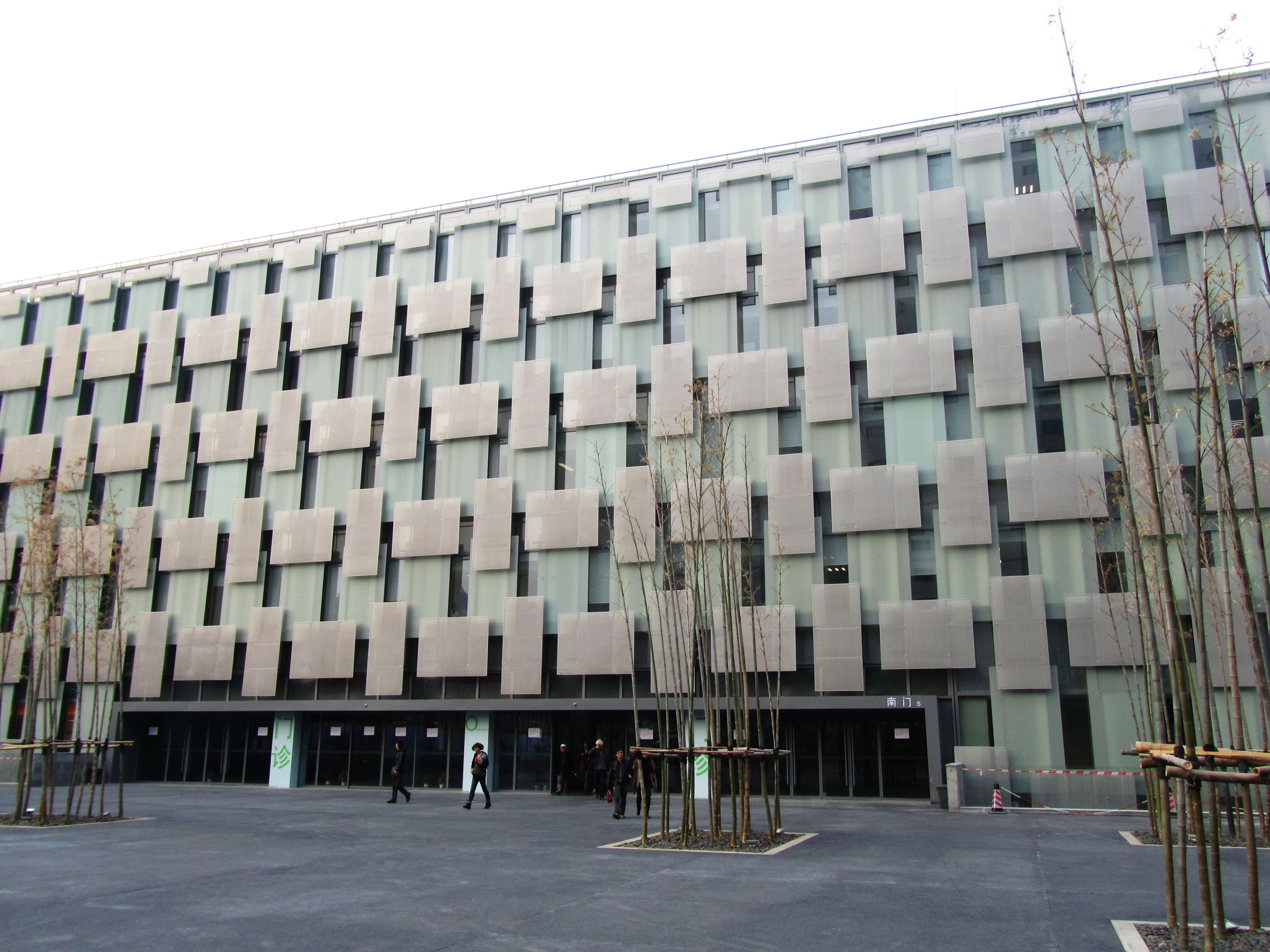
Drum Tower Hospital New Building (South Expansion Project), South Plaza

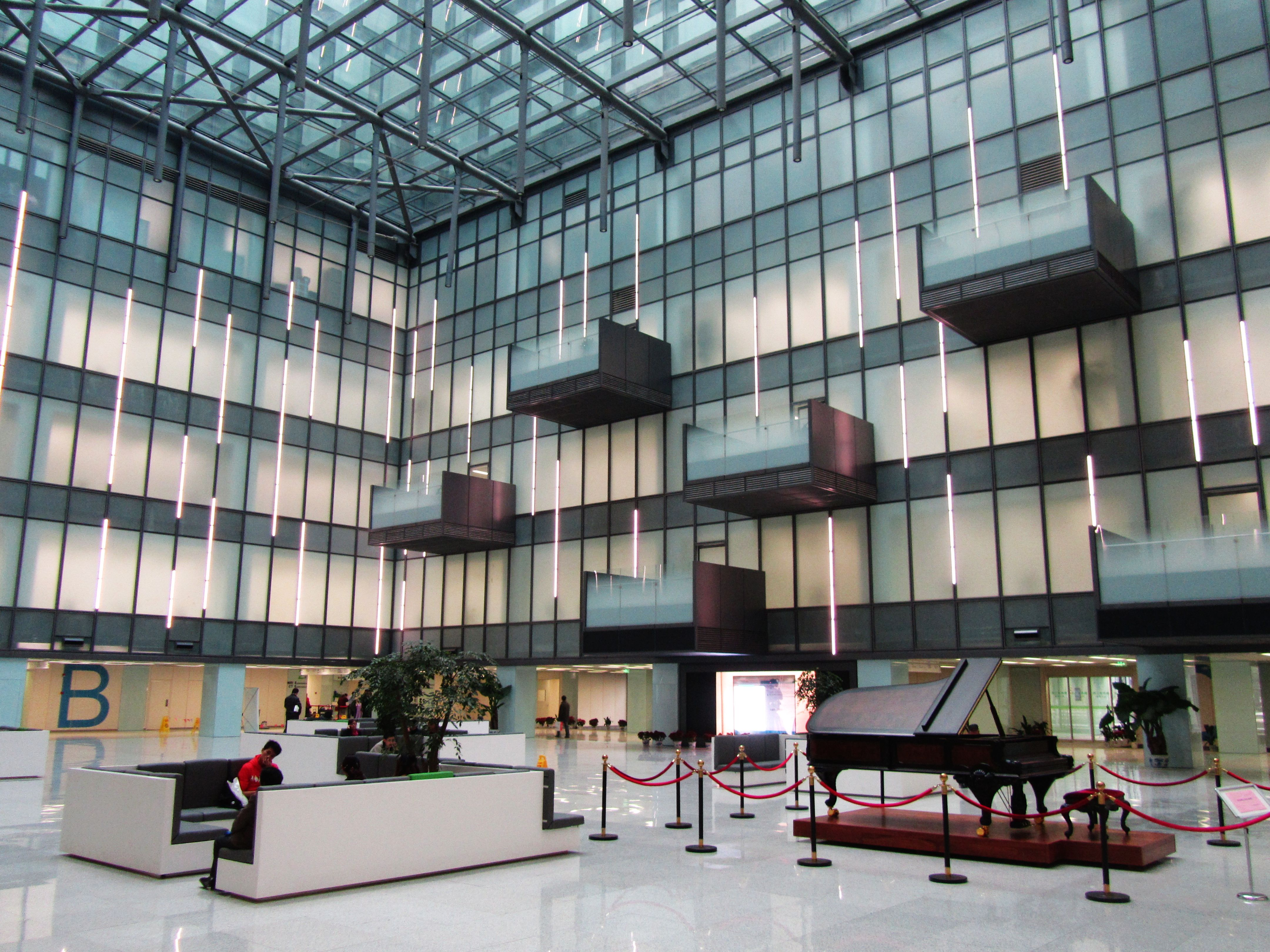
Drum Tower Hospital New Building (South Expansion Project), North Internal Atrium

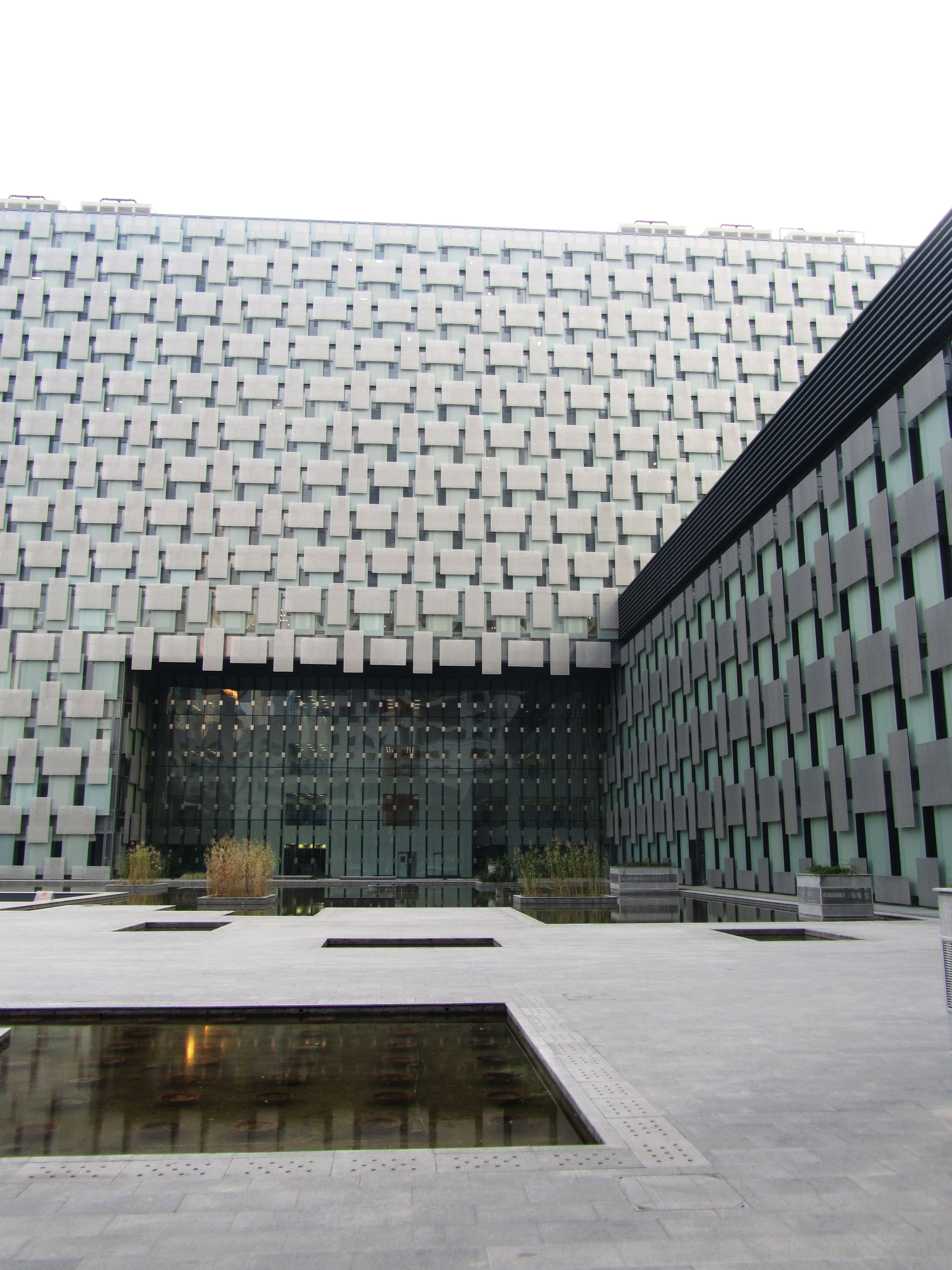
Drum Tower Hospital New Building (South Expansion Project), North External Courtyard

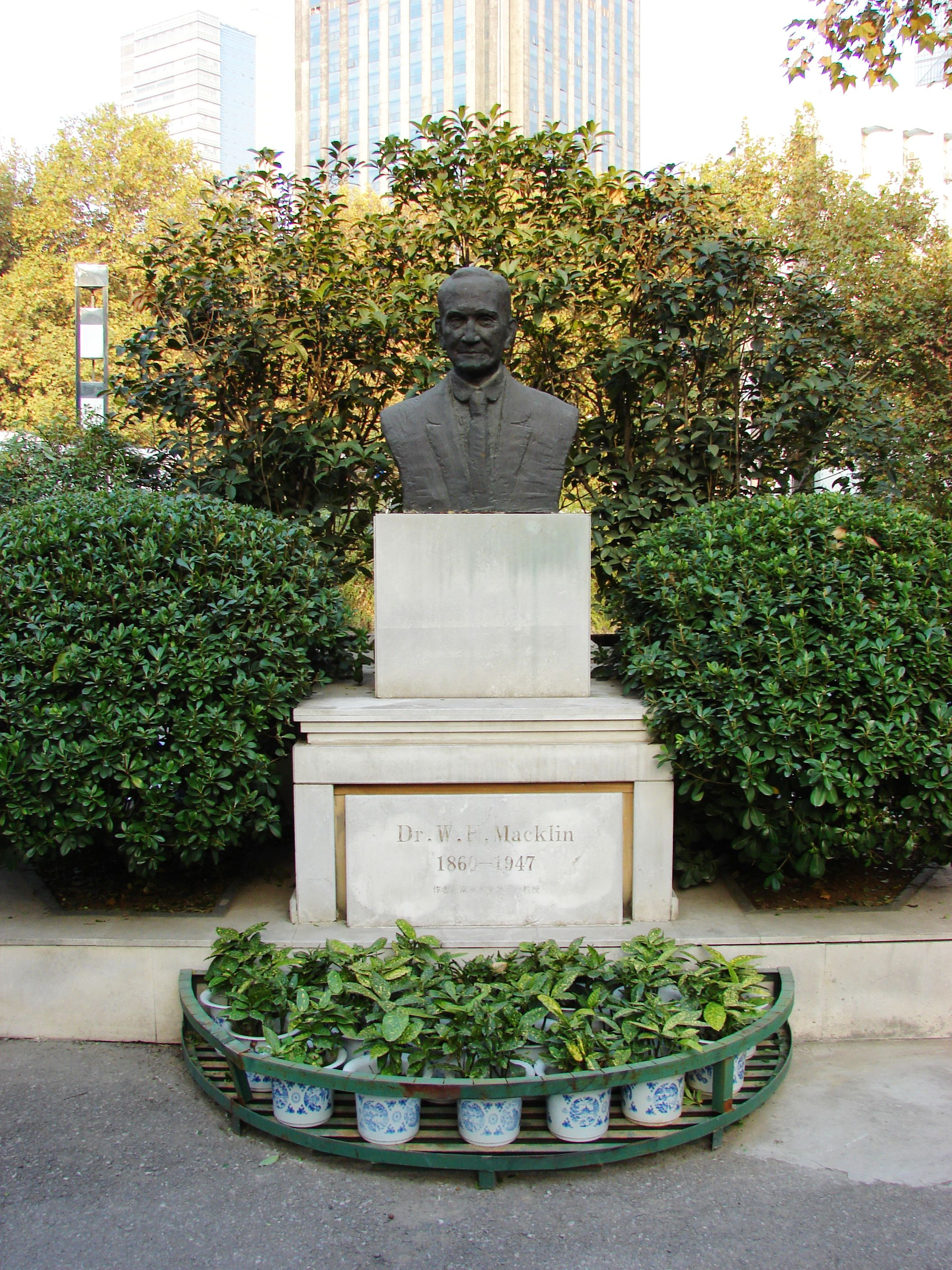
Former Site of Macklin Hospital, Statue of Founder William Edward Macklin

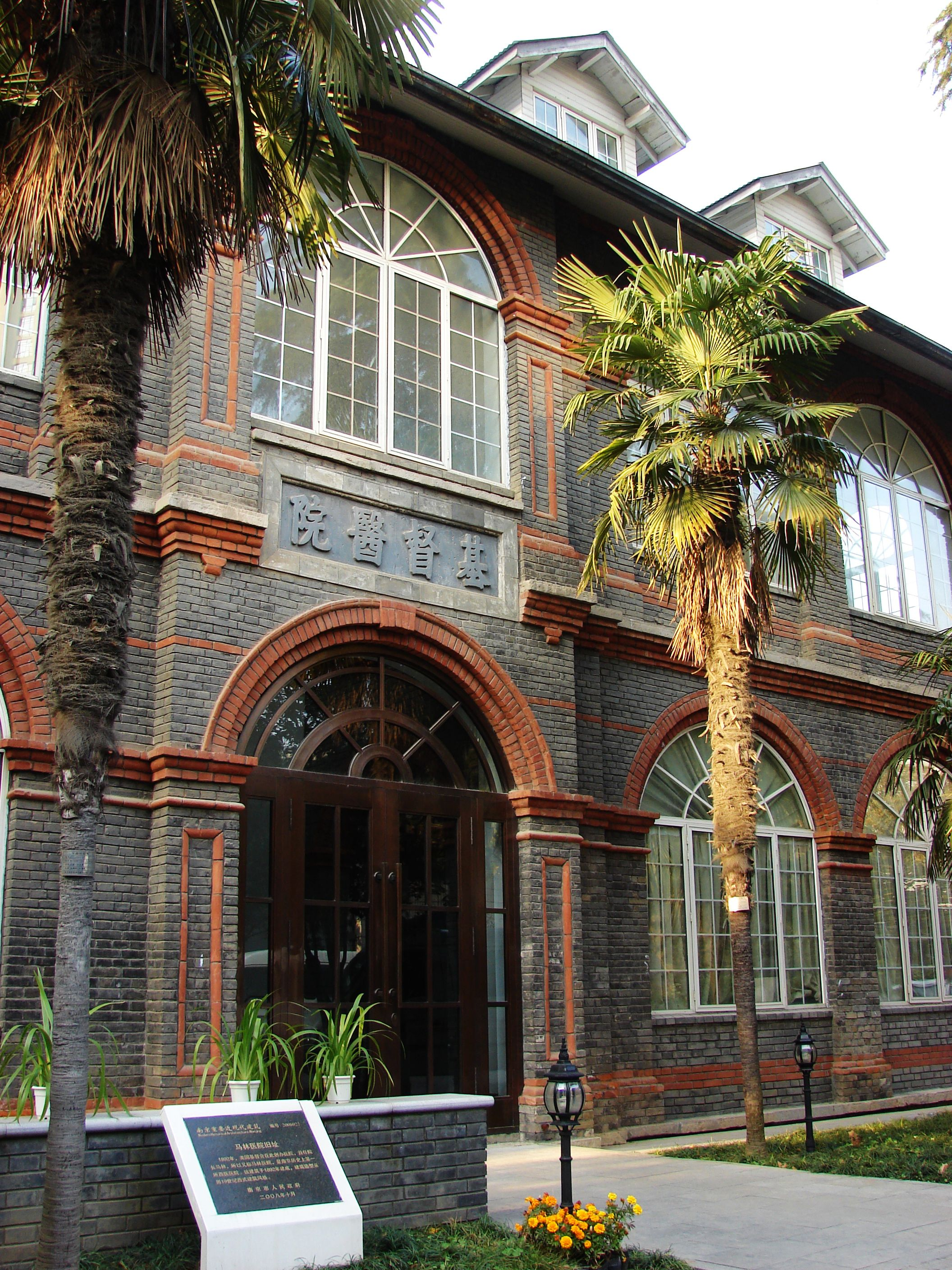
Former Site of Macklin Hospital, Entrance to the Ward Building

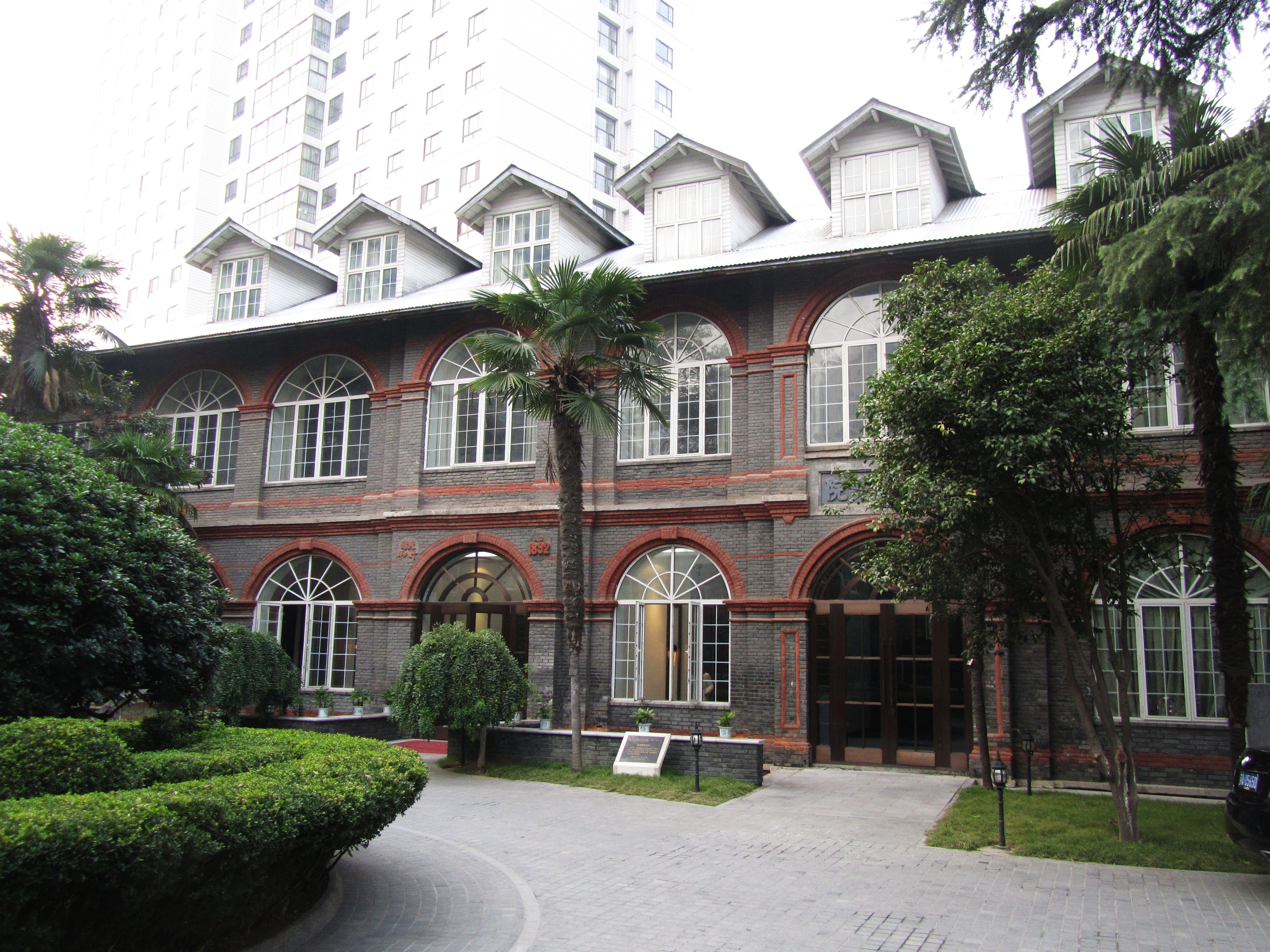
One of the Early Buildings at the Former Site of Macklin Hospital: Ward Building

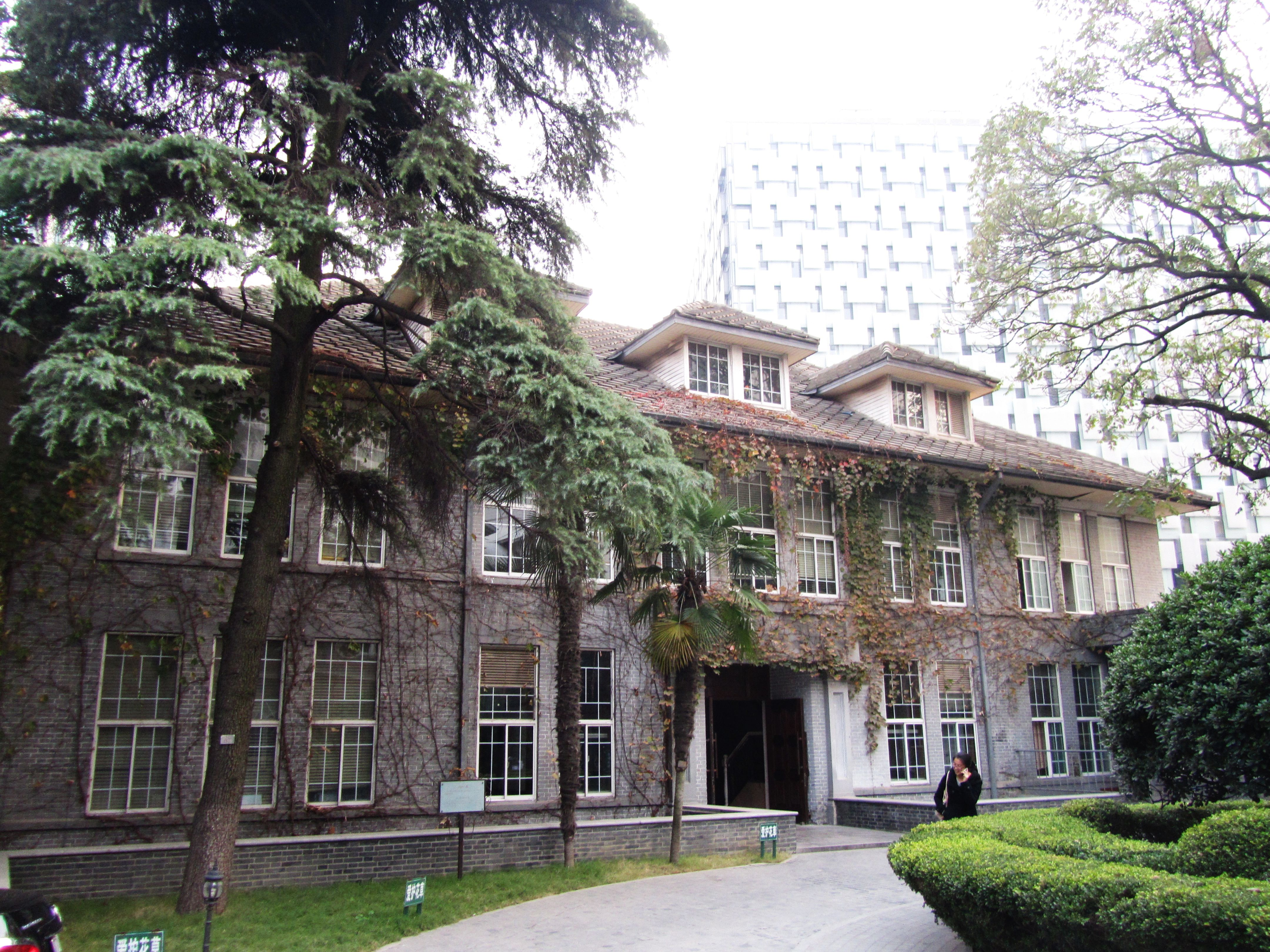
Another Early Building at the Former Site of Macklin Hospital: Operating Room and Office Building

== See also ==
- Nanjing University Medical School
- List of hospitals in China
