= William Edward Macklin =

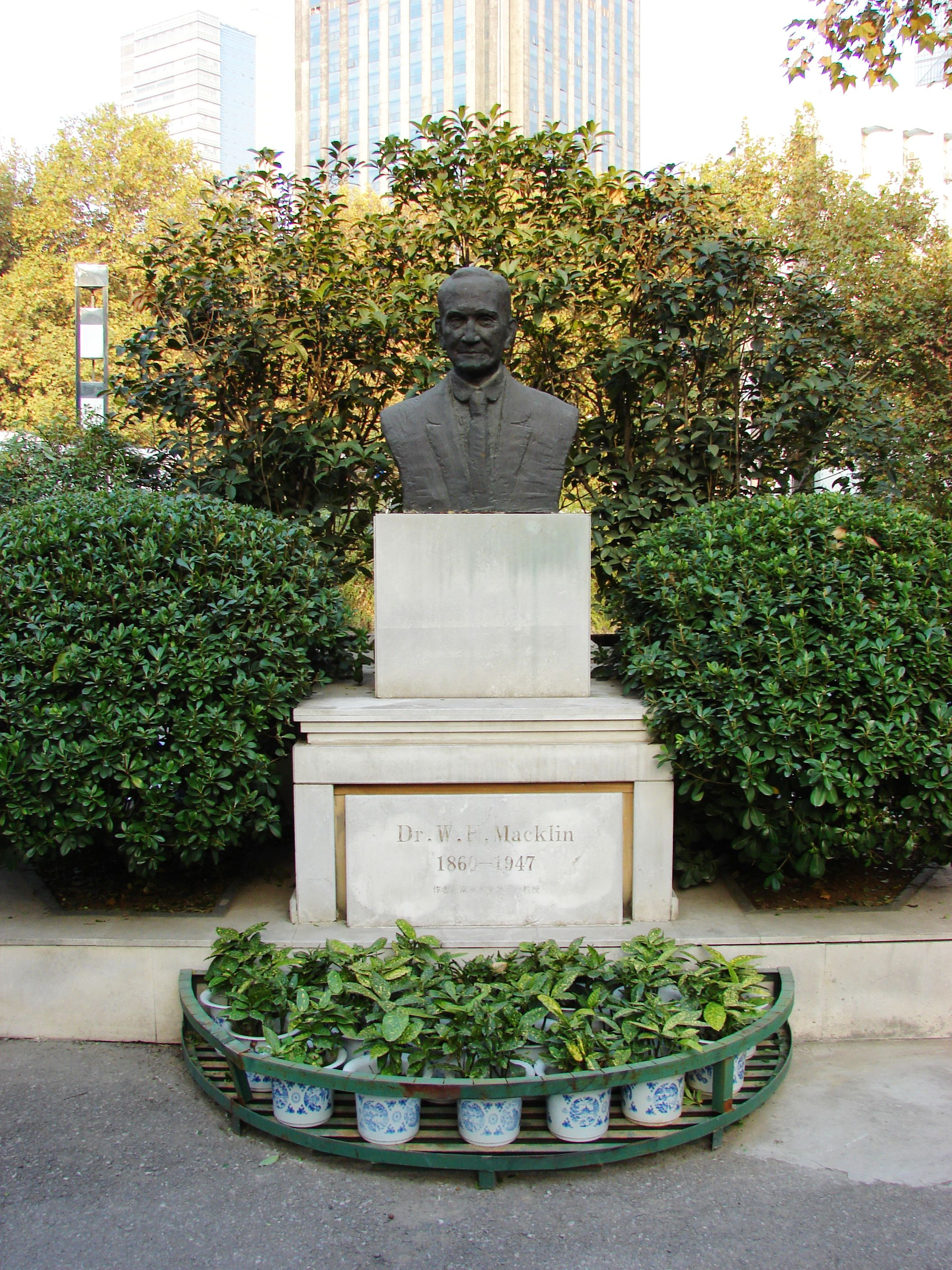
- Statue of William E. Macklin in Gulou Hospital in 2010

Personal details
- Born: 19 May 1860 London, Ontario, Canada
- Died: August 8, 1947 (aged 87) California, United States
- Denomination: Protestant
- Education: University of Toronto

Chinese name
- Simplified Chinese: 马林
- Traditional Chinese: 馬林
Transcriptions
Standard Mandarin
- Hanyu Pinyin: Mǎ Lín

William Edward Macklin (19 May 1860 – 8 August 1947), also known by his Chinese name Ma Lin (马林), was a Canadian medical missionary who mainly practiced in China.

== Biography ==
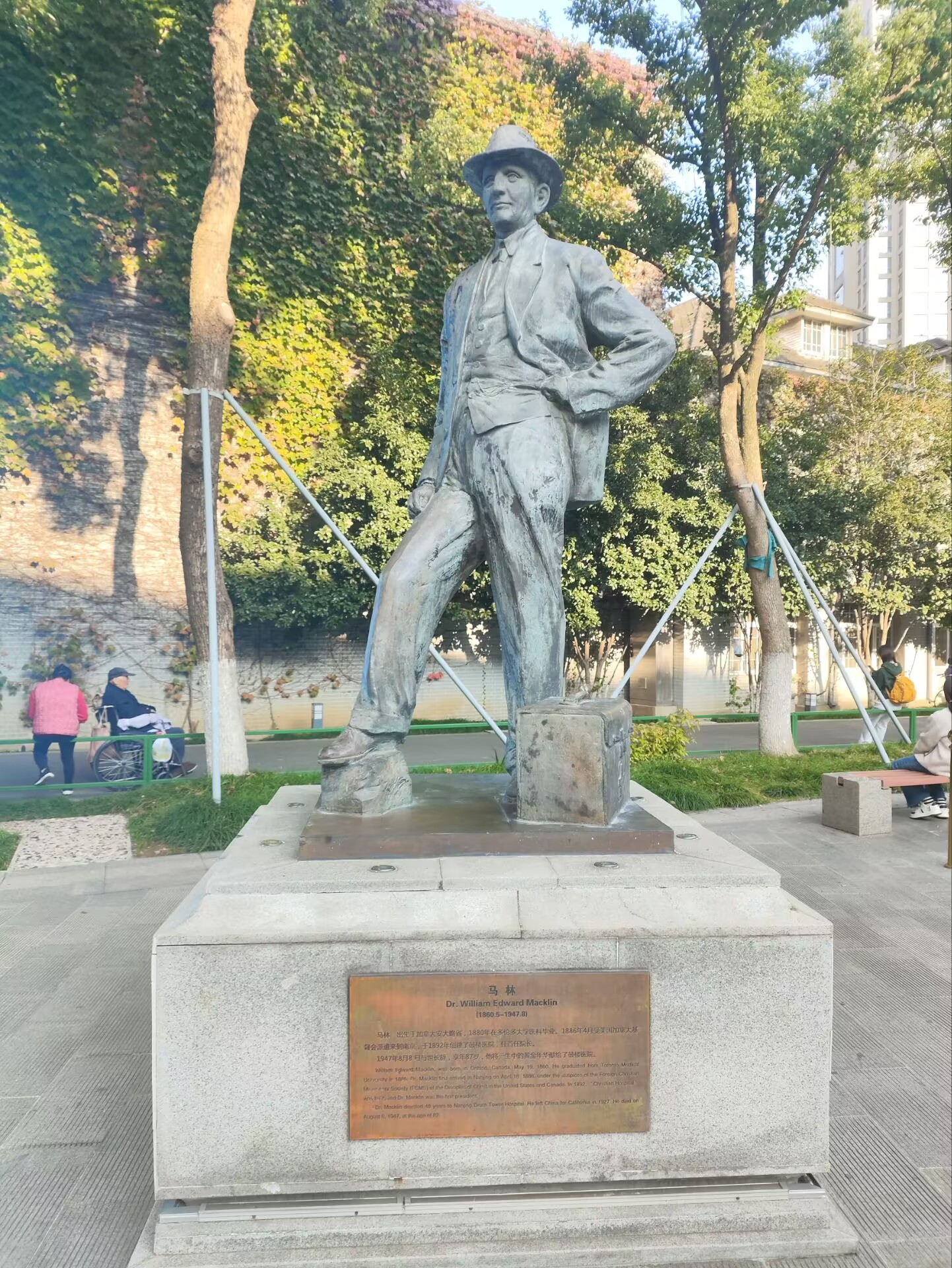
Standing statue of Ma Lin in Gulou Hospital

William Edward Macklin was born in London, Ontario, Canada on 19 May 1860. His grandfather was an Irish Methodist minister. His father was a merchant. His mother was a devout Christian of French and Irish descent. He had a brother Alfred, who became a physician, and a younger sister Daisy, also a doctor and medical missionary (马芳), as well as three other siblings.

In 1880 he graduated from the University of Toronto, where he majored in medical science. In January 1886, Macklin was sent by the Foreign Christian Missionary Society and became the first missionary of the Christian Church (Disciples of Christ) to China. He settled in Nanjing in April of that same year. Later he established three churches in Nanjing. He started the Nanking Christian Hospital, also known as the Drum Tower Hospital, in 1890 and was completed in 1893, which is the first formal western hospital in Nanjing. The hospital was locally known as "Ma Lin Hospital". He often preached in Chuxian, Hefei and other places in Anhui province. In January 1914, Jinling University acquired the hospital as an affiliated hospital, which was renamed "University Hospital of Nanking".

He was known as a public health reformer and follower of the social philosophy of Henry George.

In 1927, with the onset of the Chinese Civil War, his life was threatened, and he and his family left Nanjing. He and his wife settled in San Gabriel, California, where he died on 8 August 1947.

In 2012, Jimmy Carter visited Nanjing to unveil a statue of Macklin and dedicate a new wing of the Drum Tower Hospital.

== Personal life ==
He married Dorothy DeLany in January 1889. The couple had eight children.
