= Li Ao (academician) =

Chinese engineer (1917–1999)

- 黎鳌
- Born: 4 May 1917; Liuyang County, Hunan, China
- Died: 21 August 1999 (aged 82); China
- Scientific career
- Fields: Burn, trauma
- Institutions: Third Military Medical University

Chinese name
- Simplified Chinese: 黎鳌
- Traditional Chinese: 黎鰲
Transcriptions
Standard Mandarin
- Hanyu Pinyin: Lǐ Áo

Li Ao (Chinese: 黎鳌; 4 May 1917 – 21 August 1999) was a Chinese engineer specializing in burn and trauma, and an academician of the Chinese Academy of Engineering.

== Biography ==
Li was born in Liuyang County (now Liuyang), Hunan, on 4 May 1917, to Li Putang (黎溥棠), a teacher, and Zhou Xia (周霞), a housewife. He was the oldest of five children. Both his younger brothers Li Jieshou and Li Leishi were also academicians of the Chinese Academy of Engineering. In 1935, he was accepted to Shanghai Medical College (now belonged to Fudan University), but transferred to Xiangya Medical College (now Xiangya Medical College of Central South University) in 1937 due to the Second Sino-Japanese War. In 1939, Shanghai Medical College moved to Kunming, and Li returned to the college to finish his studies.

After graduating in 1941, Li became a surgical assistant at Zhongzheng Medical College in Nanchang.

In 1954, Li was transferred to the Seventh Military Medical University and worked at its First Affiliated Hospital.

He died on 21 August 1999, at the age of 82.

== Honours and awards ==
- 1985 State Science and Technology Progress Award (First Class) for the study of burns
- 1989 State Science and Technology Progress Award (Second Class) for the study on the nature and pathogenesis of early pulmonary edema after inhalation injury
- 1994 Member of the Chinese Academy of Engineering (CAE)
