= Nanjing University Medical School =

Medical school in Nanjing, China

Nanjing University Medical School (NUMS or sometimes NMS; Chinese: 南京大學醫學院; pinyin: Nánjīng Dàxué Yīxuéyuàn; colloquially Chinese: 南大醫學院; pinyin: Nándà Yīxuéyuàn) is the medical school of Nanjing University. The division of basic medicine is located at the Xianlin campus while the clinical medicine division is located at the Gulou campus in the centre of Nanjing.

Unlike most other university medical schools in mainland China, it is not the result of a merge with an independent medical university, and it is relatively small.

== History ==
The first public school of medicine in Nanjing was the Imperial Central Medical School (醫學) established by Qin Chengzu (秦承祖) in 443 CE, under Emperor Wen of Song. In 470, when the other specialized imperial schools merged to form the comprehensive imperial university in Nanjing under the reign of Emperor Ming, the Imperial Central Medical School remained independent. The Imperial Medical Institute (太醫院) in Ming dynasty was also not part of the imperial university, although in some periods of Chinese history imperial medical institute was part of imperial university. Some faculty members of the imperial university were experts in medicine, such as Hu Ying, president of Nanjing Imperial University. During the Ming dynasty, there was a university hospital with more than one hundred rooms.

The modern Nanjing University Medical School was founded in Shanghai in 1927, with medical preparatory education in Nanjing. It merged with the Jiangsu Medical University which had originated in 1912 in Suzhou, and the school was renamed the Medical College of National Central University in 1928. It is the first modern national university medical school in China. The first dean was Yan Fuqing. The first Chinese Doctorate of Medicine was awarded in 1931 by the school. The Medical College of National Central University became the independent National Shanghai Medical College in 1932. In 1935, National Central University established a medical school again, this time in Nanjing, initially with National Central Hospital (now Nanjing General Hospital) as clinical hospital. Qi Shounan was appointed its first dean. Meanwhile, National School of Dentistry (國立牙醫專科學校), the first public dental school in China, was also founded at the university. The National Central University moved to Chongqing while its medical school and the Department of Animal Husbandry and Veterinary Medicine of Agricultural School moved to Chengdu during the Second Sino-Japanese War. In 1949, the Medical College of National Central University was renamed the Medical College of National Nanjing University. The Nanjing University Medical College was changed to be Eastern Military Medical College in 1952, then moved to Xi'an and became the Fourth Military Medical University in 1954.

In 1987, Nanjing University reestablished a medical school, and it was the only university medical school directly under the Ministry of Education in mainland China at the time. Nanjing Gulou Hospital, formerly the hospital of University of Nanjing, became clinical teaching hospital. In 1994, Nanjing Stomatological Hospital became the third clinical teaching hospital of Nanjing University Medical School, after Gulou Hospital and Nanjing General Hospital, and Nanjing University Medical School established the School of Stomatology in 2009.

== Divisions ==
Major divisions of the school of medicine:

- Basic medicine (Division of Basic Medicine)
- Clinical medicine (Division of Clinical Medicine)
- Oral medicine (School of Stomatology)

Clinical teaching and research hospitals:

- Nanjing Gulou Hospital: The Gulou Hospital was the first modern hospital of western medicine in Nanjing, established in 1892.
- Nanjing General Hospital (南总医院, 南京总医院, Nanjing General Hospital, PLA; also named 金陵医院, Jinling Hospital or Nanking Hospital). The Nanjing General Hospital was formerly the National Central Hospital (國立中央醫院), which is the first modern national hospital directly established by Ministry of Health of China, founded in 1930.
- Nanjing Stomatological Hospital. The name "Nanjing Stomatological Hospital" was adopted in 1986; it succeeded the Institute of Dental Treatment Services of National Central Hygiene Experiment Hospital (NCHEH later to become Chinese Academy of Medical Sciences), established in 1947.

== See also ==
- Nanjing Drum Tower Hospital
