= Nanjing South railway station =

Railway and metro interchange station in Nanjing

Nanjingnan 南京南
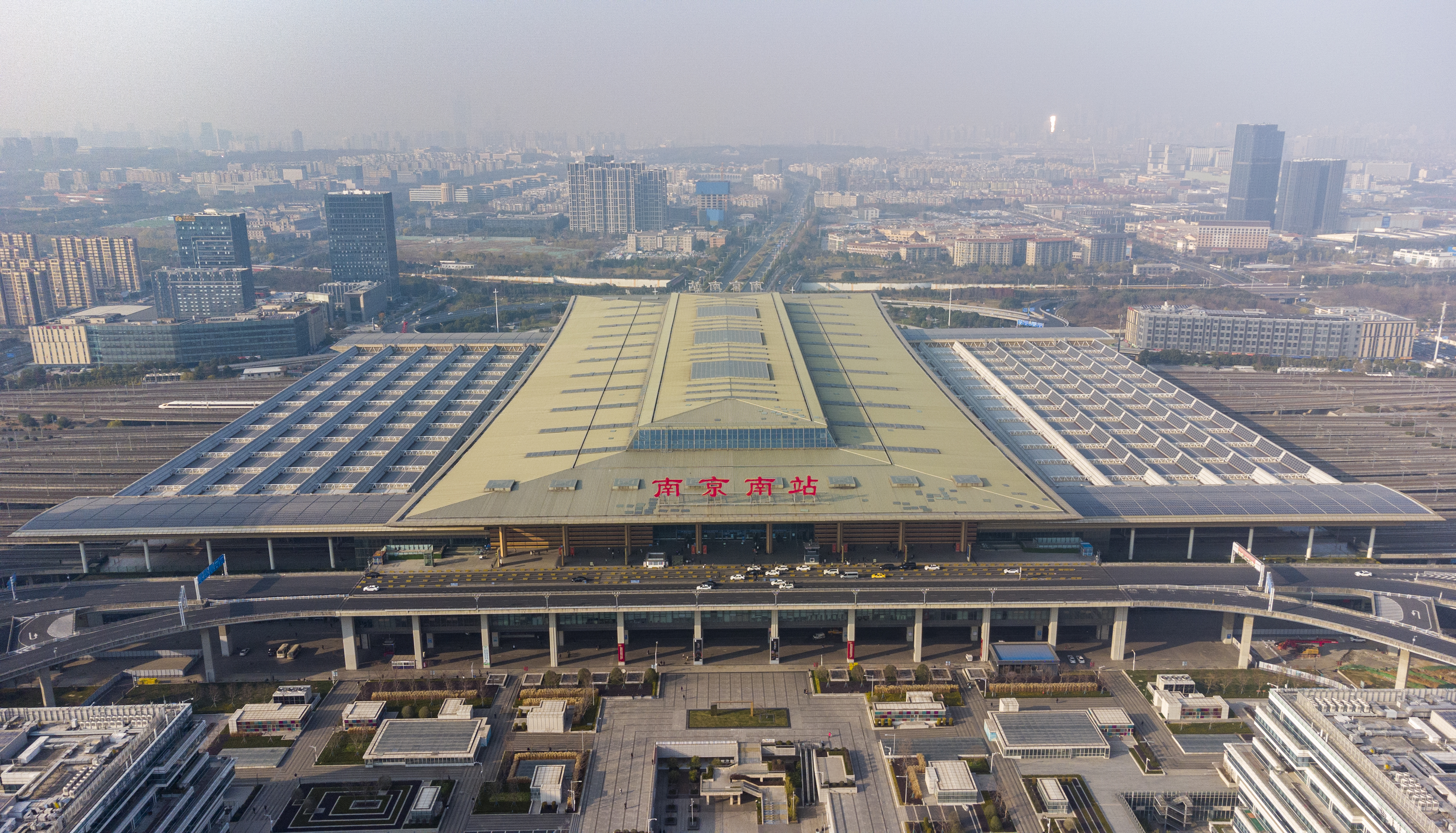
- Station exterior

Chinese name
- Chinese: 南京南站
Transcriptions
Standard Mandarin
- Hanyu Pinyin: Nánjīngnán Zhàn

General information
- Other names: Nanjing South
- Location: Yuhuatai District, Nanjing, Jiangsu; China
- Coordinates: 31°58′08″N 118°47′55″E
- Operator: CR Shanghai
- Lines: Beijing–Shanghai high-speed railway; Shanghai–Nanjing intercity railway; Hefei–Nanjing railway; Nanjing–Hangzhou high-speed railway; Nanjing–Anqing intercity railway; South Jiangsu Riverside high-speed railway
- Connections: Nanjing South Railway Station

Construction
- Structure type: At-grade
- Accessible: Yes

Other information
- Station code: 16804 (TMIS code); NKH (telegram code); NJN (pinyin code)
- Classification: Top Class station

History
- Opened: 28 June 2011
Location

Nanjingnan (Nanjing South) railway station (Chinese: 南京南站; pinyin: Nánjīngnán Zhàn) is a high-speed railway station in Nanjing, the capital of Jiangsu province, serving the Beijing–Shanghai (Jinghu) high-speed railway, Shanghai–Nanjing (Huning) intercity railway, Nanjing–Hangzhou (Ninghang) high-speed railway, Shanghai–Wuhan–Chengdu (Huhanrong) high-speed railway, Nanjing–Anqing intercity railway and the South Jiangsu Riverside high-speed railway. The new Nanjing South railway station is located a few kilometers south of downtown Nanjing in Yuhuatai District, and has a connection with the Nanjing Metro, served by Lines 1, 3, S1 and S3. Construction on the station began on 10 January 2008, and the station opened on 28 June 2011, two days before the opening of the Beijing–Shanghai high-speed railway.

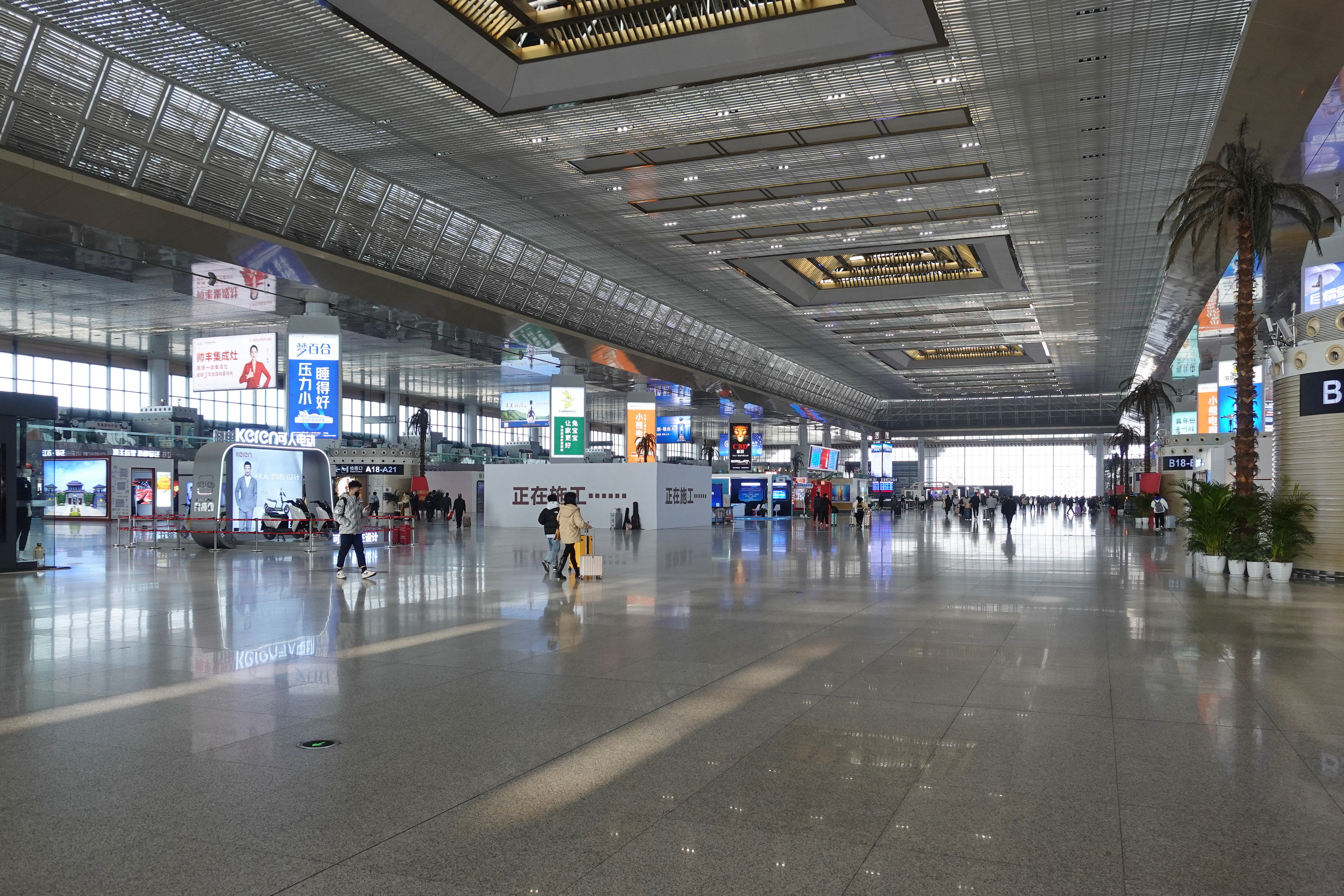
Waiting hall

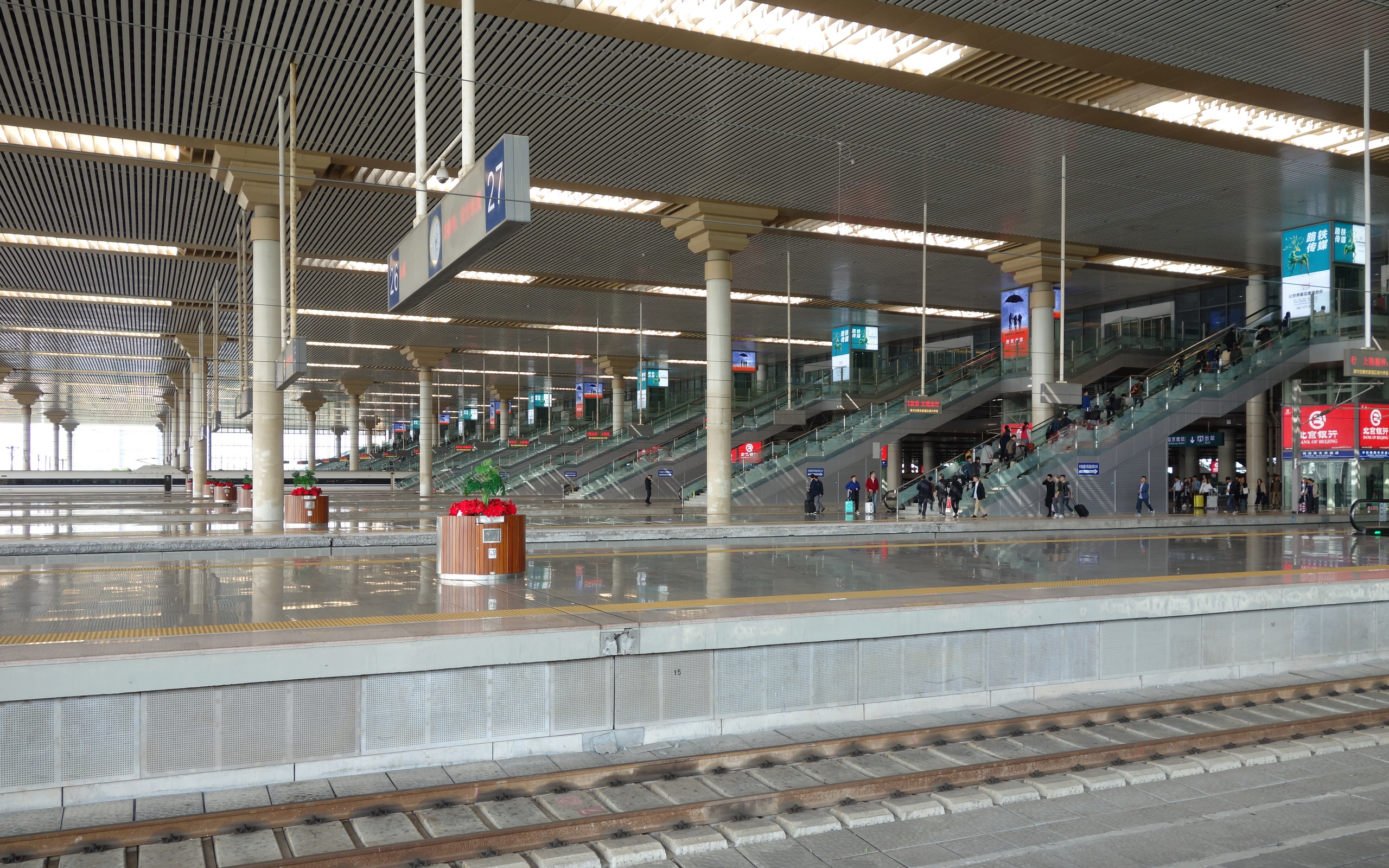
Station platforms

== History ==
Before the construction of the (New) Nanjing South Railway Station, the name "Nanjing South Railway Station" was applied to another station: a fairly minor rail station located just outside the Gate of China (Zhonghuamen) of Nanjing's walled city, much closer to the city centre than the new Nanjing South Railway Station. To avoid confusion, the (old) South Railway Station has now been renamed as the Zhonghuamen railway station.

== Design ==
The dimension of the main roof is 456m x 216m (excluding smaller roof on both sides of the main roof), the main roof is constructed with steel weighing more than 8000 tons. The roof over the waiting hall area is 72,000 square meters (775,001 square ft). The entire railway station has 128 escalators and 28 platforms (a combination of island-platforms and side-platforms). At the peak of the construction phase, there were more than 20,000 construction workers and engineers on site. Solar panels cover the majority of the railway station roof and are capable of providing 228 MWs of electricity within 25 years.

It is one of the world's largest railway stations in terms of gross floor area, at 458,000 m^{2} (4,930,000 sq ft), and nearly six times larger than the pre-existing Nanjing railway station to the north. The five floors allow for a zero-distance transfer to Nanjing Metro, Nanjing municipal buses, and Airport bus lines. On 30 September 2016 the metro station served a peak volume of 102,300 passengers.

Nanjing South Railway station has implemented its "Smart Station System" to adjust lighting based on passenger flow and environmental conditions. The system also monitors air conditioning and heating across the station. The station saved over 5 million kilowatt-hours of electricity, reduced steam usage by 24,700 tons, and cut carbon emissions by more than 7,000 tons in 2021. Nanjing South Railway Station's "solar roof" was the world's largest integrated solar power system in 2011, set to generate 228 million kilowatt-hours over 25 years—saving over 85,000 tons of coal.

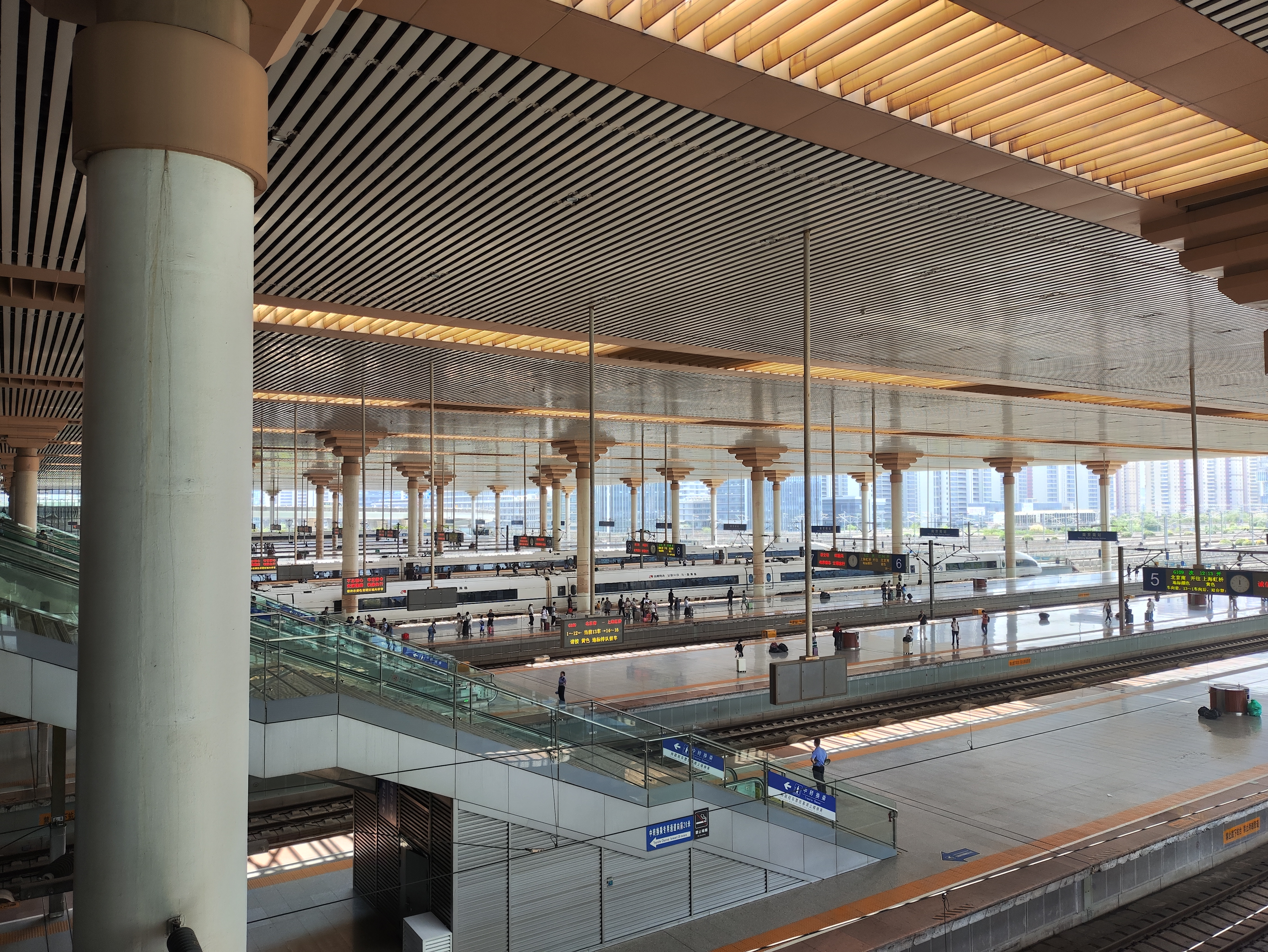
Incorporated traditional architectural elements in the station

The design inside the building incorporated traditional architectural elements to reflect the history of Nanjing, for it used to be the capital of 6 different ancient dynasties with massive resources. The construction has successfully combined Nanjing's history and modernity by involving dual eaves, colonnades, dougong brackets, brickwork and paper-cut into decorations.

== Impact ==
The opening of Nanjing South station improved regional connectivity and stimulated local economic growth, facilitated tourism, and attracted businesses to Nanjing. The station has also become a catalyst for large-scale urban development projects. It boosted the growth of commercial districts, shopping centers, and business parks, serving as a landmark for modern urban infrastructure.

Due to its strategic position, the station experiences high passenger traffic. In the summer transport season of 2023, Nanjing South handled over 10 million passengers, with an average of more than 650 train services operating daily.

== Metro connections ==
Nanjingnan Railway Station (Nanjing South Railway Station) 南京南站
- Platform for Line 3 towards Moling

General information
- Location: Yuhuatai District, Nanjing, Jiangsu; China
- Coordinates: 31°58′16″N 118°47′34″E
- Operator: Nanjing Metro
- Lines: Line 1; Line 3; Line 6; Line S1; Line S3
- Platforms: 8 (3 island platforms and 2 side platforms)
- Tracks: 8
- Connections: Nanjingnan

Construction
- Structure type: Underground
- Accessible: Yes

History
- Opened: 28 June 2011
Services
Preceding station	Nanjing Metro	Following station
Huashenmiao towards Baguazhoudaqiaonan	Line 1	Shuanglongdadao towards CPU
Mingfaguangchang towards Linchang	Line 3	Hongyundadao towards Moling
Jiagang towards Qixiashan	Line 6	through to Line S1
through to Line 6	Line S1	Cuipingshan towards Konggangxinchengjiangning
Terminus	Line S3	Jingmingjiayuan towards Gaojiachong
Location

Nanjing South Railway Station serves as a vital transportation hub, integrating high-speed rail services with the Nanjing Metro system. The station acts as a major junction for multiple metro lines, including Line 1, Line 3, Line S-1 and S3, facilitating connections to different parts of the city and surrounding area. Its strategic location enables transfers between various transport modes, such as buses and taxis.

Although Line 1 of the Nanjing Metro had already opened its southern extension from Andemen to CPU on 28 May 2010, the metro station did not open until 28 June 2011, in conjunction with the opening of the railway station itself. Line S1, connecting Nanjing South and the rest of the Nanjing Metro system with Lukou International Airport, opened on 1 July 2014. The connections with Lines 3 and S3 respectively opened on 1 April 2015 and 6 December 2017 with the opening of those lines.

== Adjacent stations (CR) ==
Preceding station	China Railway High-speed	Following station
Chuzhou towards Beijing South or Tianjin West	Beijing–Shanghai high-speed railway Part of the Shanghai–Wuhan–Chengdu passenger-dedicated railway	Zhenjiang South towards Shanghai Hongqiao
Xianlin towards Shanghai or Shanghai Hongqiao	Shanghai–Nanjing intercity railway Part of the Shanghai–Wuhan–Chengdu passenger-dedicated railway	Terminus
Terminus	Nanjing–Anqing intercity railway	Jiangning West towards Anqing
Terminus	Nanjing–Hangzhou high-speed railway	Jiangning towards Hangzhou East
Terminus	Shanghai–Nanjing Riverside high-speed railway	Jurong towards Taicang

== See also ==
- Gaozi South railway station
- Nanjing railway station
- Zhonghuamen railway station
- Nanjing West railway station
- Nanjing North railway station
