= Ruanjiandadao station =

Nanjing Metro station

Ruanjiandadao 软件大道
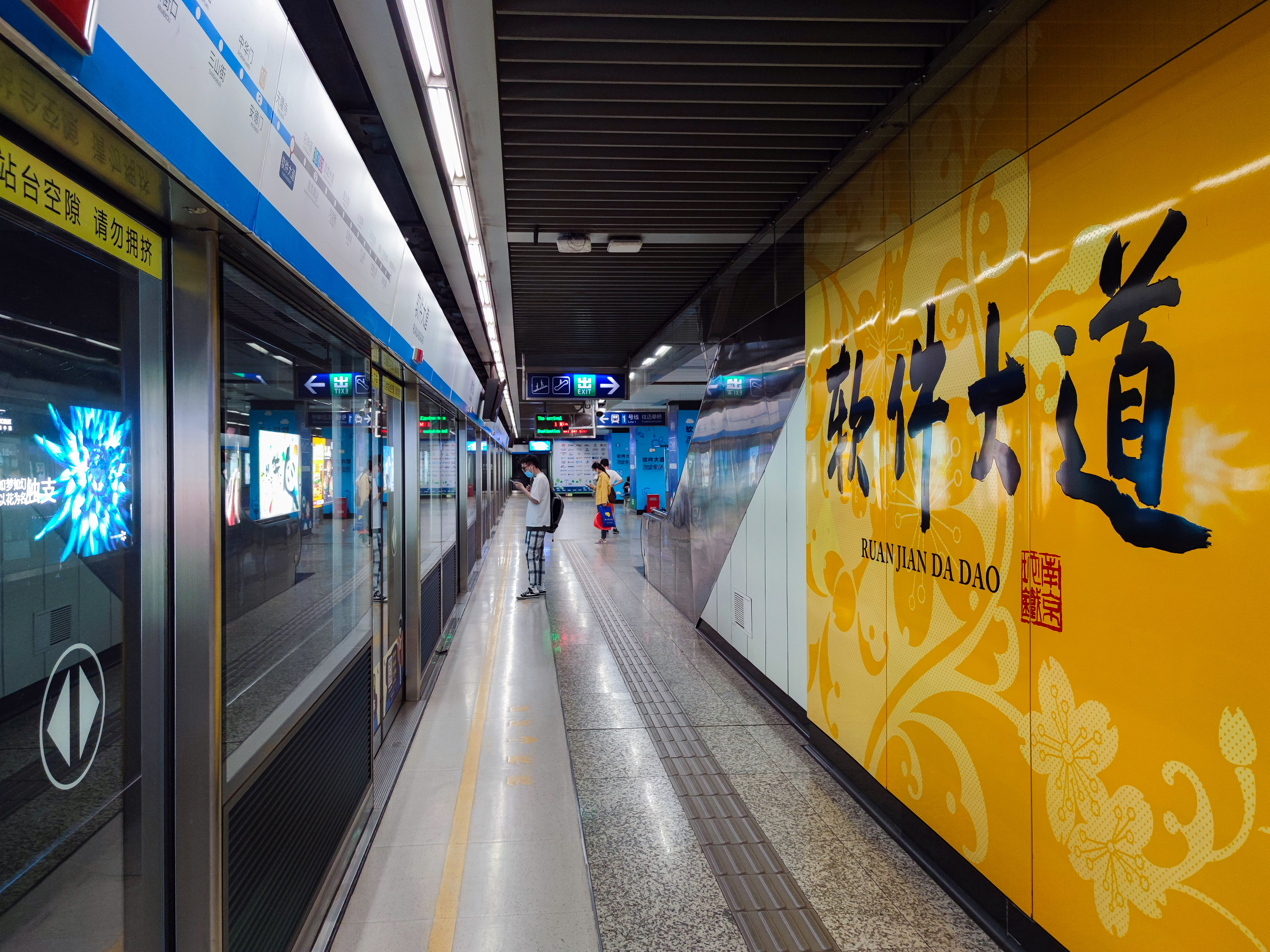

General information
- Location: Ruanjian Avenue and Huashen Avenue (花神大道); Yuhuatai District, Nanjing, Jiangsu; China
- Coordinates: 31°58′38″N 118°46′29″E
- Operator: Nanjing Metro Co. Ltd.
- Line: Line 1

Construction
- Structure type: Underground

Other information
- Station code: 114

History
- Opened: 28 May 2010

Services
Preceding station	Nanjing Metro	Following station
Tianlongsi towards Baguazhoudaqiaonan	Line 1	Huashenmiao towards CPU
Location

Ruanjiandadao station (simplified Chinese: 软件大道站; traditional Chinese: 軟件大道站; pinyin: Ruǎnjiàndàdào Zhàn; lit. 'software avenue station') is a station of Line 1 of the Nanjing Metro, named after and located along the eponymous avenue of the same name.

== History ==
It began operations on 28 May 2010, as part of the southern extension of line 1 from Andemen to CPU.

During the planning and construction stages, the station was named Ningnandadao station (宁南大道站; 寧南大道站; Níngnándàdào Zhàn; 'Ning (Nanjing) south avenue station') until around May 2009, when the Nanjing Municipal Bureau of Civil Affairs (南京市民政部) approved a name change of both the eponymous avenue and station to the present names, in order to increase the name recognition of Yuhua Software Park (雨花软件园).
