= Huashenmiao station =

Nanjing Metro station

Coordinates: 31°58′40″N 118°47′07″E

Huashenmiao 花神庙
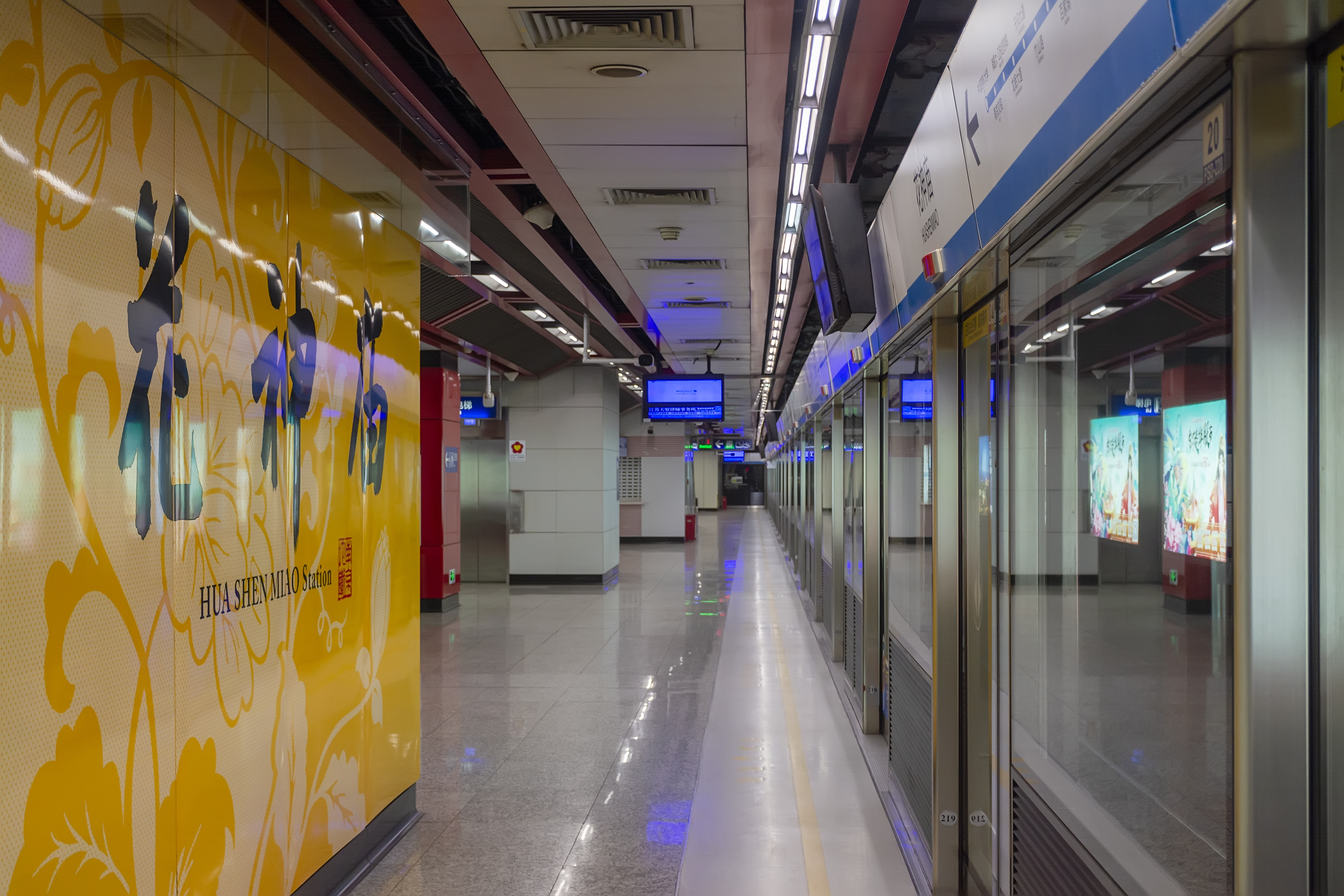

General information
- Location: Ruanjian Avenue (软件大道); Yuhuatai District, Nanjing, Jiangsu; China
- Operated by: Nanjing Metro Co. Ltd.
- Line(s): Line 1

Construction
- Structure type: Underground

Other information
- Station code: 113

History
- Opened: 28 May 2010

Services
| Preceding station | Nanjing Metro | Following station |
|---|---|---|
| Ruanjiandadao towards Baguazhoudaqiaonan | Line 1 | Nanjing South Railway Station towards CPU |

Huashenmiao station (simplified Chinese: 花神庙站; traditional Chinese: 花神廟站; pinyin: Huāshénmiào Zhàn; lit. 'Temple of Flower Deity station') is a station of Line 1 of the Nanjing Metro, named after the nearby Ming-era Huashen Temple. It began operations on 28 May 2010, as part of the southern extension of line 1 from Andemen to CPU.
