= Xiaolongwan station =

Nanjing Metro station

Coordinates: 31°55′46″N 118°49′56″E

Xiaolongwan 小龙湾
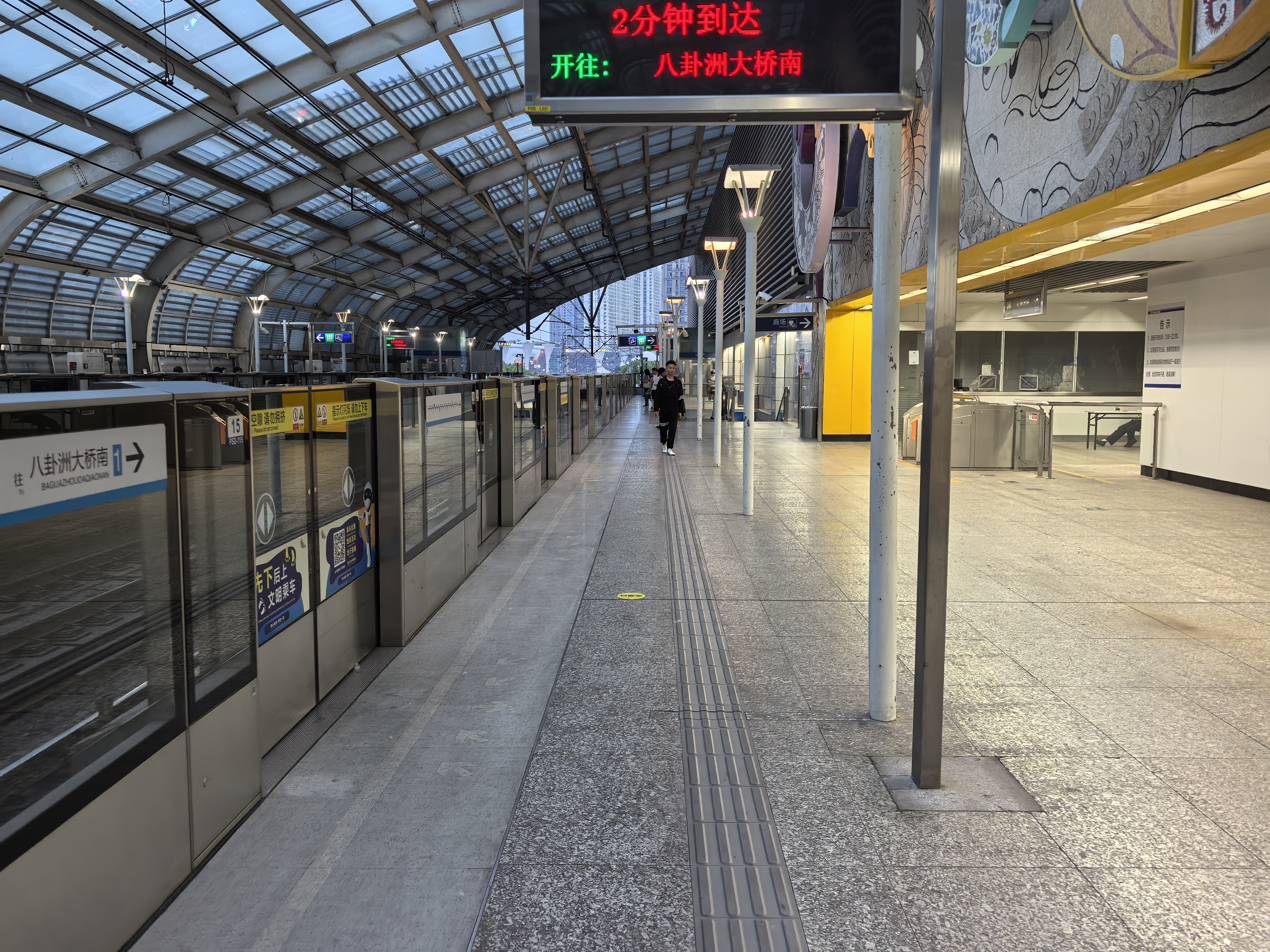

General information
- Location: Middle Tianyuan Road (G104); Jiangning District, Nanjing, Jiangsu; China
- Operated by: Nanjing Metro Co. Ltd.
- Line: Line 1

Construction
- Structure type: Elevated

Other information
- Station code: 107

History
- Opened: 28 May 2010

Services
Preceding station	Nanjing Metro	Following station
Baijiahu towards Baguazhoudaqiaonan	Line 1	Zhushanlu towards CPU
Location

Xiaolongwan station (simplified Chinese: 小龙湾站; traditional Chinese: 小龍灣站; pinyin: Xiǎolóngwān Zhàn) is a station of Line 1 of the Nanjing Metro. It began operations on 28 May 2010, as part of the southern extension of line 1 from Andemen to CPU.
