= Shengtailu station =

Nanjing Metro station

Coordinates: 31°56′39″N 118°49′17″E

Shengtailu 胜太路
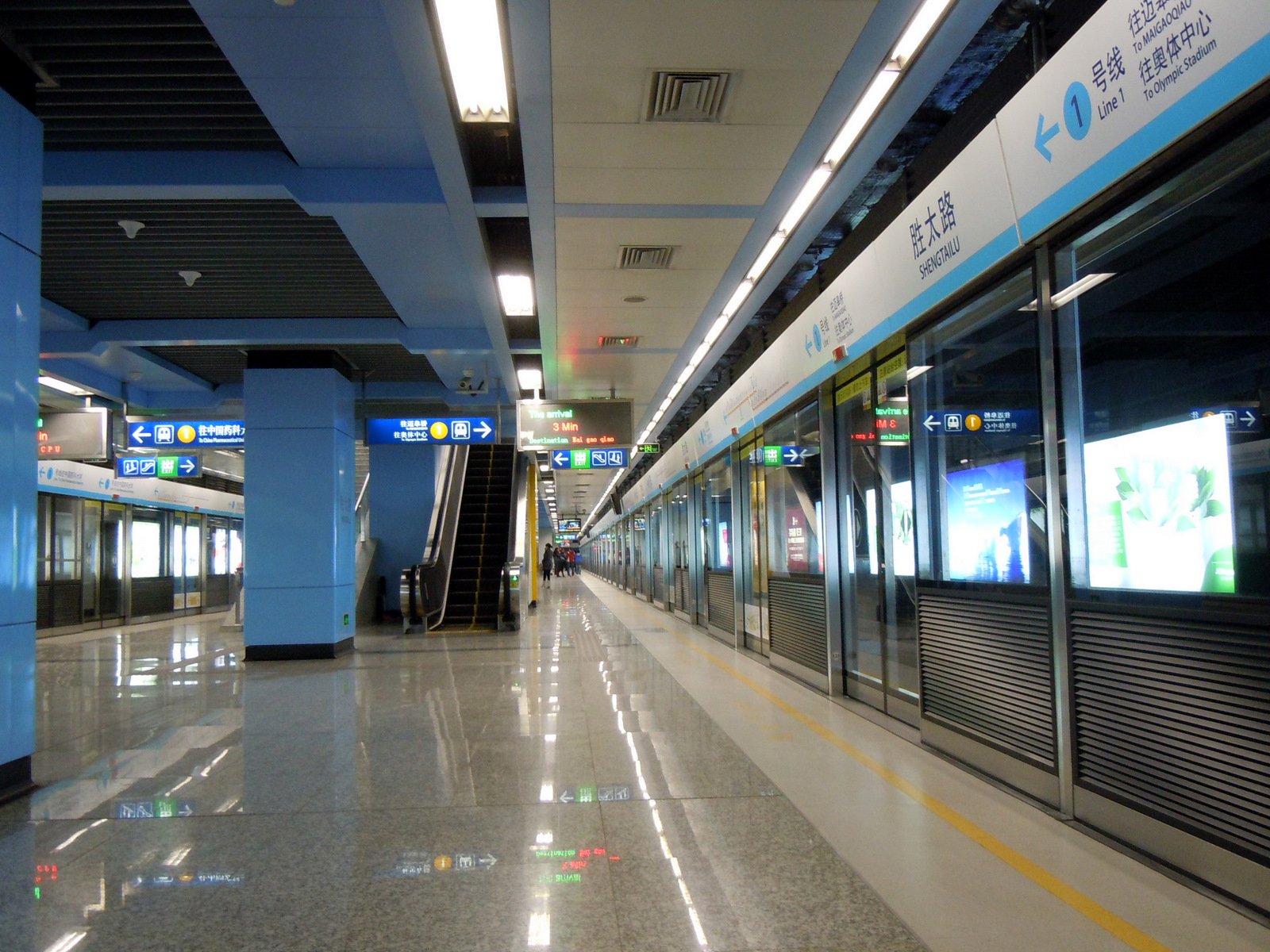
- Station platform in December 2010

General information
- Location: Shuanglong Avenue (双龙大道) and Shengtai Road; Jiangning District, Nanjing, Jiangsu; China
- Operated by: Nanjing Metro Co. Ltd.
- Line(s): Line 1

Construction
- Structure type: Underground

Other information
- Station code: 109

History
- Opened: 28 May 2010

Services
Preceding station	Nanjing Metro	Following station
Hedingqiao towards Baguazhoudaqiaonan	Line 1	Baijiahu towards CPU

Shengtailu station (simplified Chinese: 胜太路站; traditional Chinese: 勝太路站; pinyin: Shèngtàilù Zhàn; lit. 'Shengtai Road station') is a station of Line 1 of the Nanjing Metro. It began operations on 28 May 2010, as part of the southern extension of line 1 from Andemen to CPU.
