= Shuanglongdadao station =

Nanjing Metro station

Coordinates: 31°57′46″N 118°49′05″E

Shuanglongdadao 双龙大道
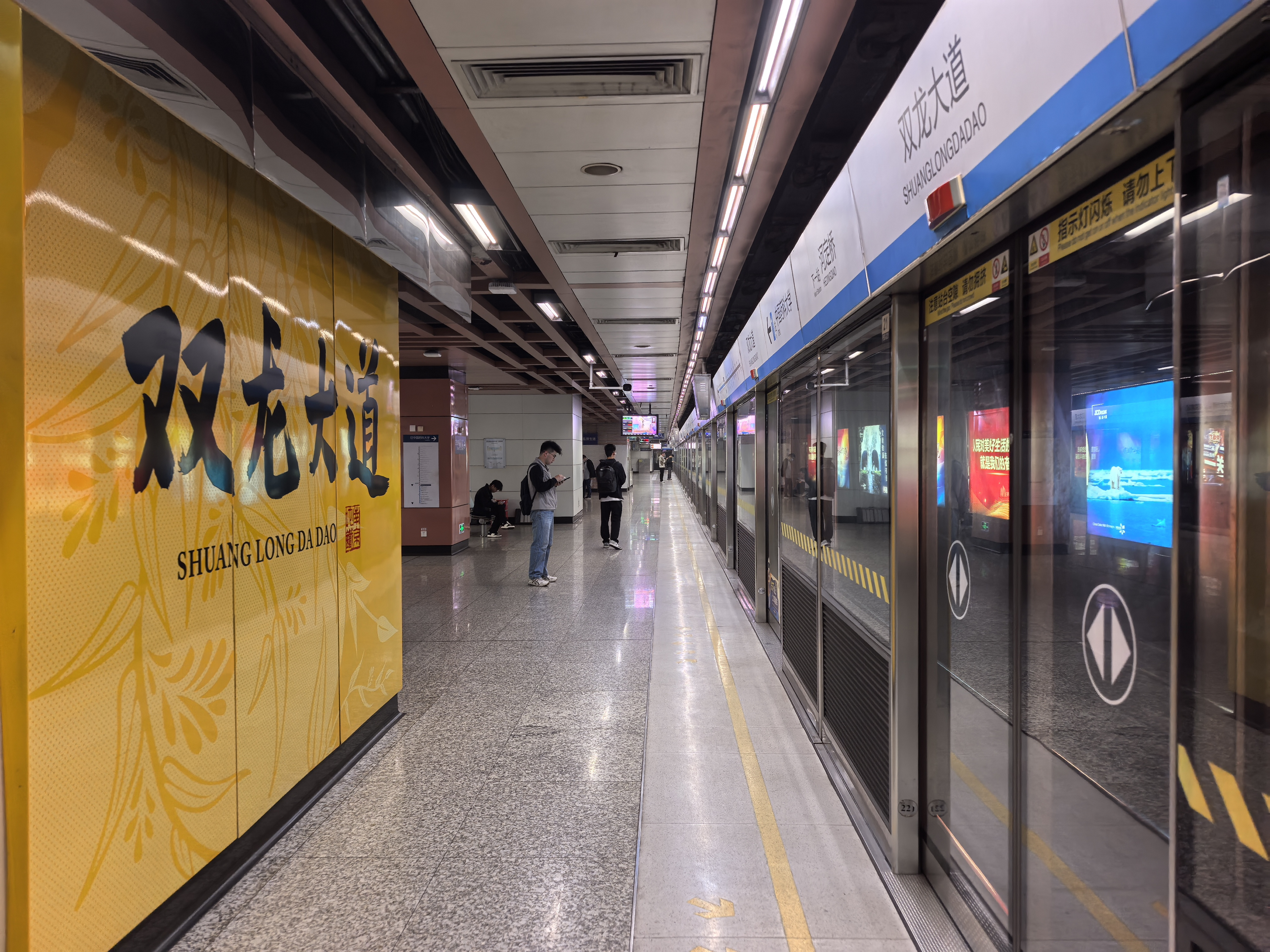

Chinese name
- Simplified Chinese: 双龙大道站
- Traditional Chinese: 雙龍大道站
- Literal meaning: Shuanglong (double dragon) Avenue station
Transcriptions
Standard Mandarin
- Hanyu Pinyin: Shuānglóngdàdào Zhàn

General information
- Location: Shuanglong Avenue; Jiangning District, Nanjing, Jiangsu; China
- Operated by: Nanjing Metro Co. Ltd.
- Line: Line 1

Construction
- Structure type: Underground

Other information
- Station code: 111

History
- Opened: 28 May 2010

Services
Preceding station	Nanjing Metro	Following station
Nanjing South Railway Station towards Baguazhoudaqiaonan	Line 1	Hedingqiao towards CPU
Location

Shuanglongdadao station (Chinese: 双龙大道站) is a station of Line 1 of the Nanjing Metro. It began operations on 28 May 2010, as part of the southern extension of line 1 from Andemen to CPU.
