= Xinmofanmalu station =

Nanjing Metro station

Coordinates: 32°04′48″N 118°47′02″E

Xinmofanmalu 新模范马路
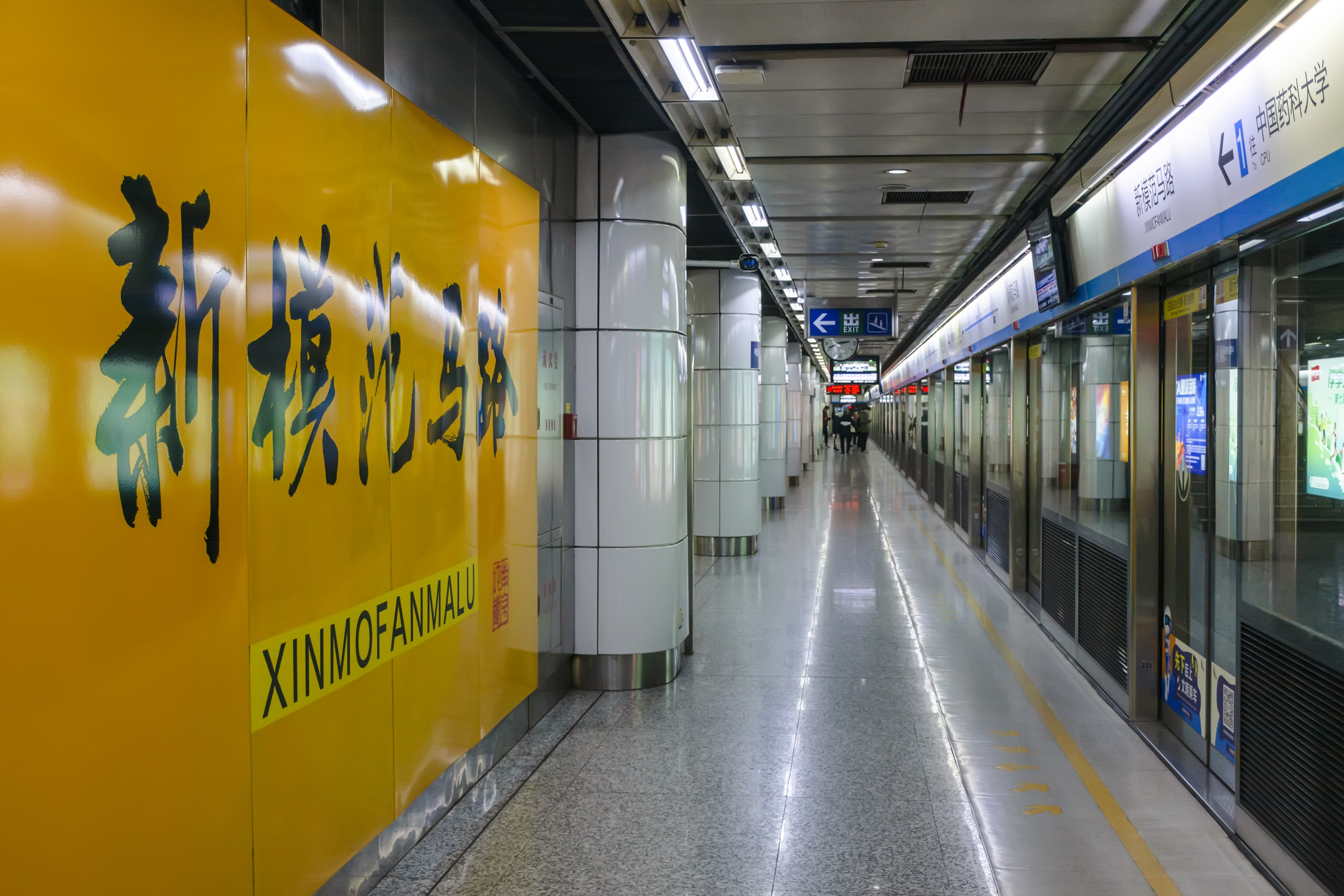

General information
- Location: Zhongyang Road; Gulou District, Nanjing, Jiangsu; China
- Operated by: Nanjing Metro Co. Ltd.
- Line(s): Line 1

Construction
- Structure type: Underground

Other information
- Station code: 124

History
- Opened: 3 September 2005

Services
Preceding station	Nanjing Metro	Following station
Nanjing Railway Station towards Baguazhoudaqiaonan	Line 1	Xuanwumen towards CPU

Xinmofanmalu station (simplified Chinese: 新模范马路站; traditional Chinese: 新模範馬路站; pinyin: Xīnmófànmǎlù Zhàn) is a station of Line 1 of the Nanjing Metro. It started operations on 3 September 2005 as part of the line's Phase I from Maigaoqiao to Andemen. (Note: The section from Andemen to Olympic Stadium that initially opened as Line 1 was re-designated as Line 10 when the latter opened in 2014.)
