= Baijiahu station =

Nanjing Metro station

Coordinates: 31°55′54″N 118°49′17″E

Baijiahu 百家湖
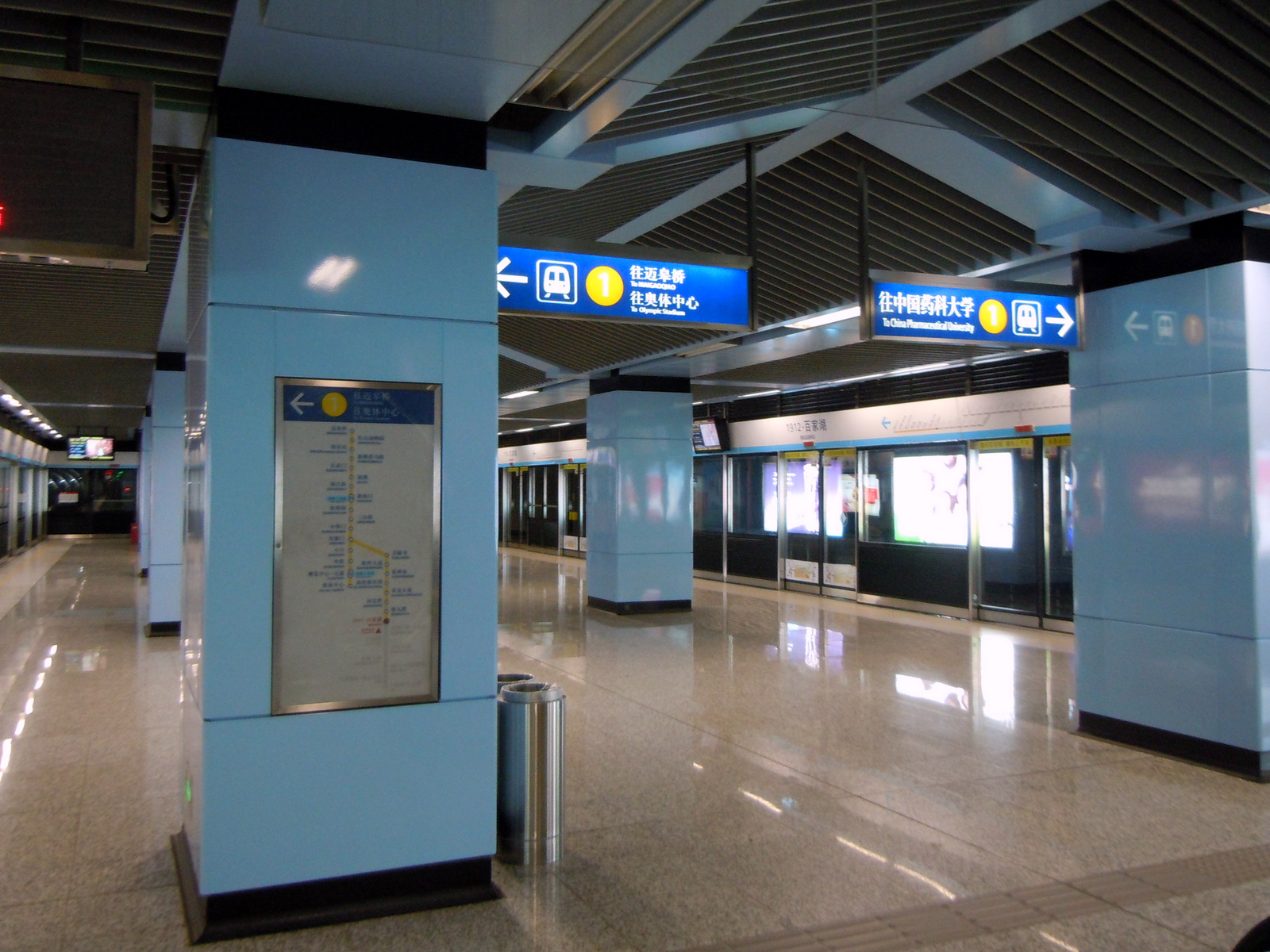
- Station platform in December 2010

General information
- Location: Shuanglong Avenue (双龙大道); Jiangning District, Nanjing, Jiangsu; China
- Operated by: Nanjing Metro Co. Ltd.
- Line(s): Line 1

Construction
- Structure type: Underground

Other information
- Station code: 108

History
- Opened: 28 May 2010

Services
Preceding station	Nanjing Metro	Following station
Shengtailu towards Baguazhoudaqiaonan	Line 1	Xiaolongwan towards CPU

Baijiahu station (Chinese: 百家湖站; pinyin: Bǎijiāhú Zhàn) named after Baijia Lake nearby to the northwest, is a station of Line 1 of the Nanjing Metro. It began operations on 28 May 2010, as part of the southern extension of line 1 from Andemen to CPU.
