= Zhushanlu station =

Nanjing Metro station

Coordinates: 31°55′57″N 118°50′42″E

Zhushanlu 竹山路
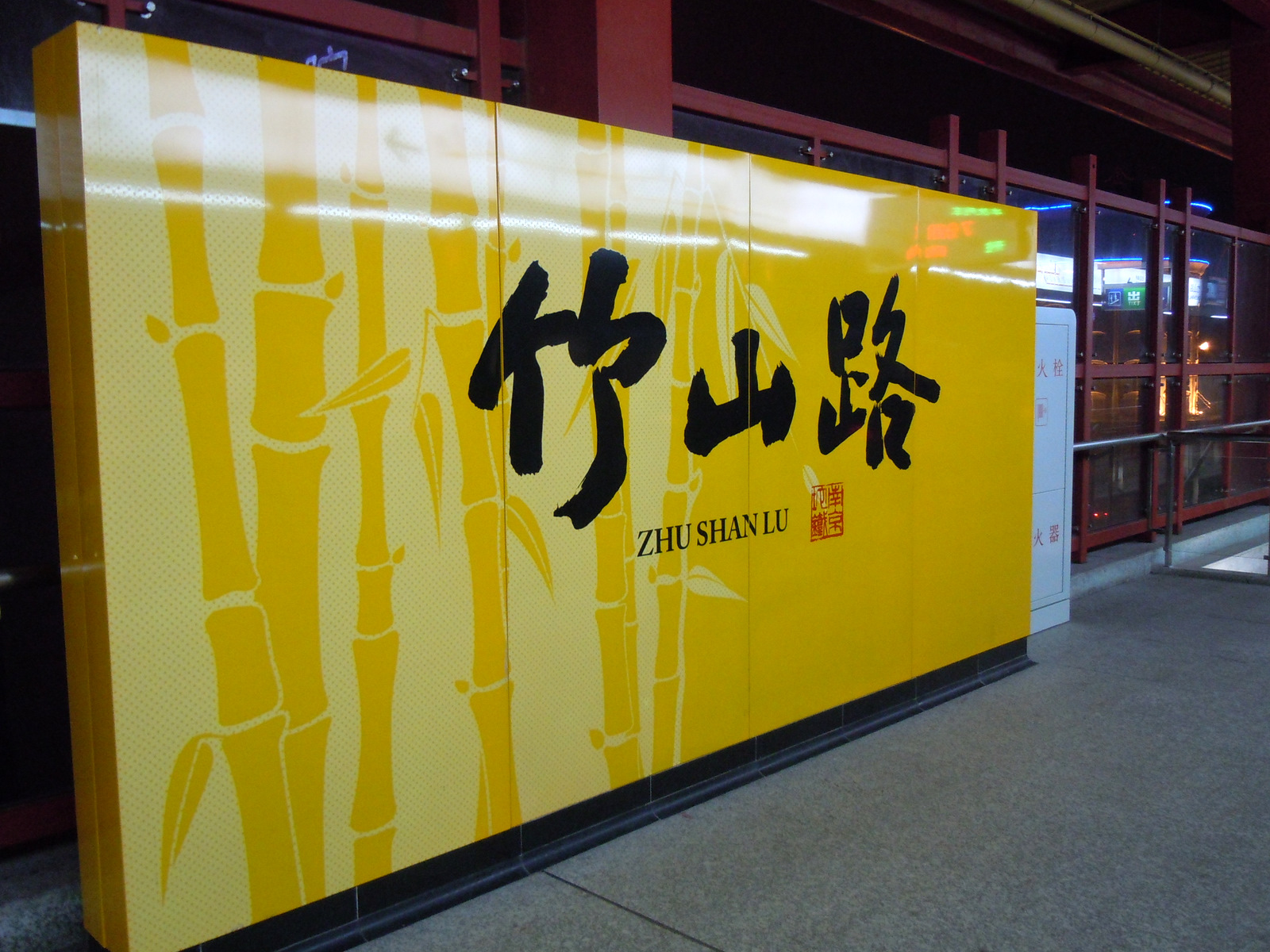

General information
- Location: Middle Tianyuan Road (G104) and Zhushan Road; Jiangning District, Nanjing, Jiangsu; China
- Operated by: Nanjing Metro Co. Ltd.
- Lines: Line 1 Line 5

Construction
- Structure type: Elevated

Other information
- Station code: 106

History
- Opened: 28 May 2010 (Line 1); 31 March 2024 (Line 5)

Services
| Preceding station | Nanjing Metro | Following station |
|---|---|---|
| Xiaolongwan towards Baguazhoudaqiaonan | Line 1 | Tianyindadao towards CPU |
| Xintinglu towards Fangjiaying | Line 5 | Keninglu towards Jiyindadao |
Location

Zhushanlu station (Chinese: 竹山路站; pinyin: Zhúshānlù Zhàn; lit. 'Zhushan Road station') is a station of Line 1 and Line 5 of the Nanjing Metro. It began operations on 28 May 2010, as part of the southern extension of line 1 from Andemen to CPU.
