= Tianlongsi station =

Nanjing Metro station

Coordinates: 31°58′42″N 118°45′46″E

Tianlongsi 天隆寺
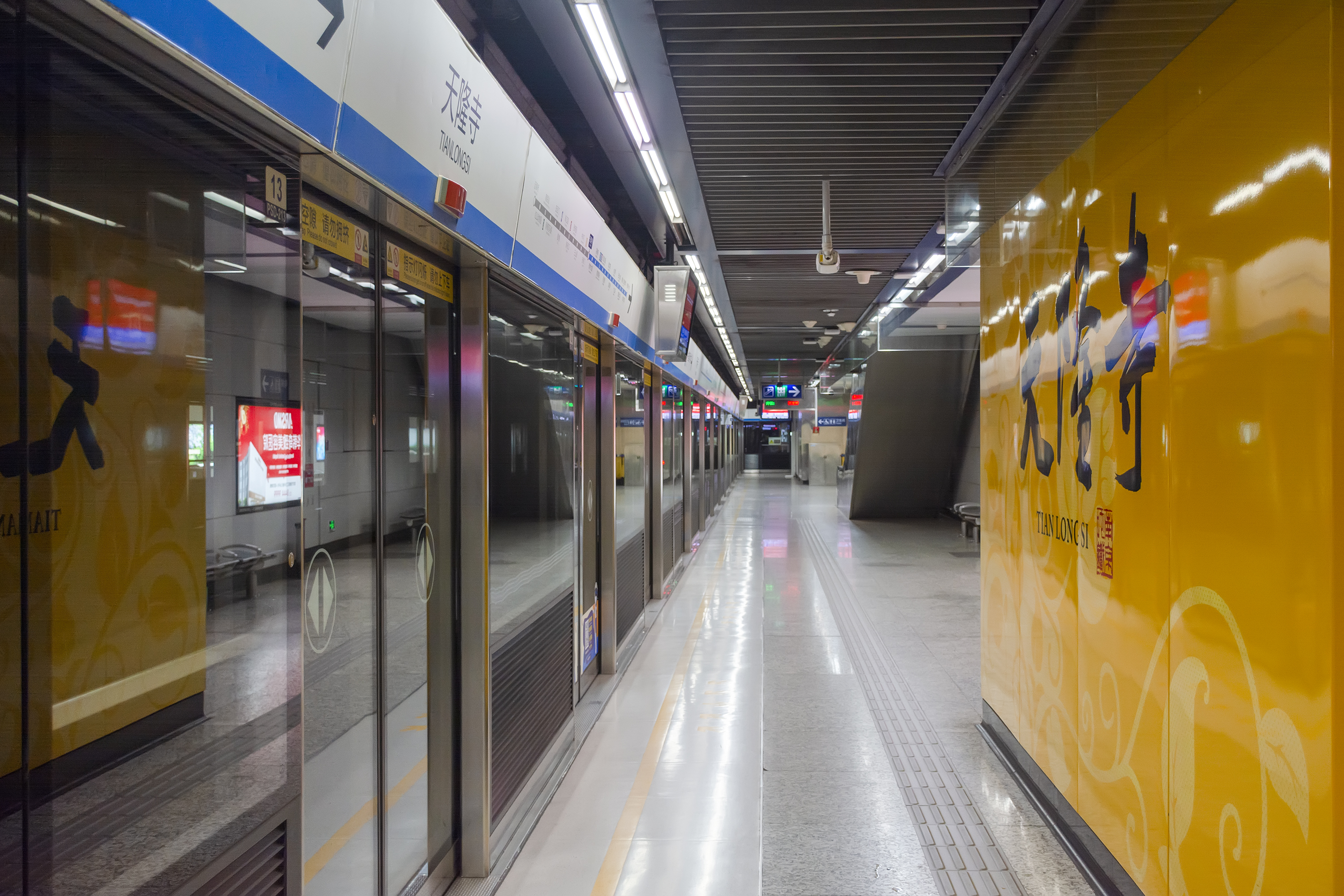

General information
- Location: Andemen Street (安德门大街); Yuhuatai District, Nanjing, Jiangsu; China
- Operated by: Nanjing Metro Co. Ltd.
- Line(s): Line 1

Construction
- Structure type: Underground

Other information
- Station code: 115

History
- Opened: 28 May 2010

Services
Preceding station	Nanjing Metro	Following station
Andemen towards Baguazhoudaqiaonan	Line 1	Ruanjiandadao towards CPU

Tianlongsi station (Chinese: 天隆寺站; pinyin: Tiānlóngsì Zhàn; lit. 'Tianlong Temple station') is a station of Line 1 of the Nanjing Metro. It began operations on 28 May 2010, as part of the southern extension of line 1 from Andemen to CPU.

== Nearby places ==
- Juhuatai
- Tianlong Temple
