= Tianyindadao station =

Nanjing Metro station

Coordinates: 31°56′16″N 118°51′49″E

Tianyindadao 天印大道
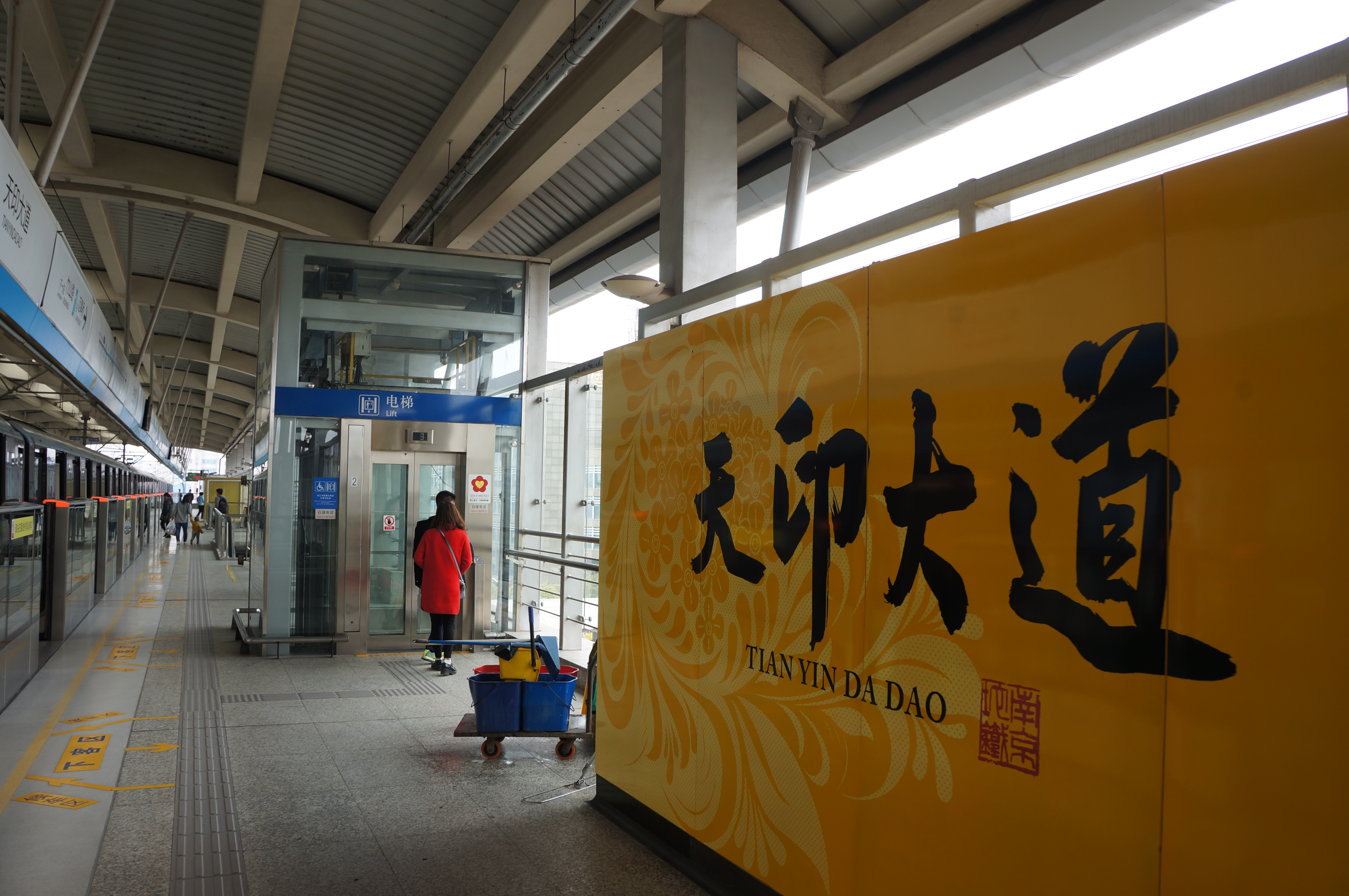

General information
- Location: East Tianyuan Road (G104) and Tianyin Avenue; Jiangning District, Nanjing, Jiangsu; China
- Operated by: Nanjing Metro Co. Ltd.
- Line(s): Line 1

Construction
- Structure type: Elevated

Other information
- Station code: 105

History
- Opened: 28 May 2010

Services
Preceding station	Nanjing Metro	Following station
Zhushanlu towards Baguazhoudaqiaonan	Line 1	Longmiandadao towards CPU

Tianyindadao station (Chinese: 天印大道站; pinyin: Tiānyìndàdào Zhàn; lit. 'Tianyin Avenue station') is a station of Line 1 of the Nanjing Metro. It began operations on 28 May 2010, as part of the southern extension of line 1 from Andemen to CPU.
