= Xuanwumen station (Nanjing Metro) =

Nanjing Metro station

Coordinates: 32°04′13″N 118°47′03″E

Xuanwumen station 玄武门站

General information
- Location: Zhongyang Road and Xuanwumen Road (玄武门路); Xuanwu District, Nanjing, Jiangsu; China
- Line: Line 1

Other information
- Station code: 123

History
- Opened: 3 September 2005

Services
| Preceding station | Nanjing Metro | Following station |
|---|---|---|
| Xinmofanmalu towards Baguazhoudaqiaonan | Line 1 | Gulou towards CPU |
Location

Xuanwumen station (simplified Chinese: 玄武门站; traditional Chinese: 玄武門站; pinyin: Xuánwǔmén Zhàn) is a station of Line 1 of the Nanjing Metro. It started operations on 3 September 2005 as part of the line's Phase I from Maigaoqiao to Andemen. (Note: The section from Andemen to Olympic Stadium that initially opened as Line 1 was re-designated as Line 10 when the latter opened in 2014.)

The station is named after Xuanwumen or Xuanwu Gate: the north gate of Ming Palace, Nanjing; Xuanwu itself refer to Black Tortoise, a deity for North.

== Nearby places ==
- Xuanwu Lake
- Hunan Road Commercial Street and Lions' Bridge (Shiziqiao) Pedestrian Street (狮子桥步行街)
