= Longmiandadao station =

Nanjing Metro station

Coordinates: 31°56′24″N 118°52′37″E

Longmiandadao 龙眠大道
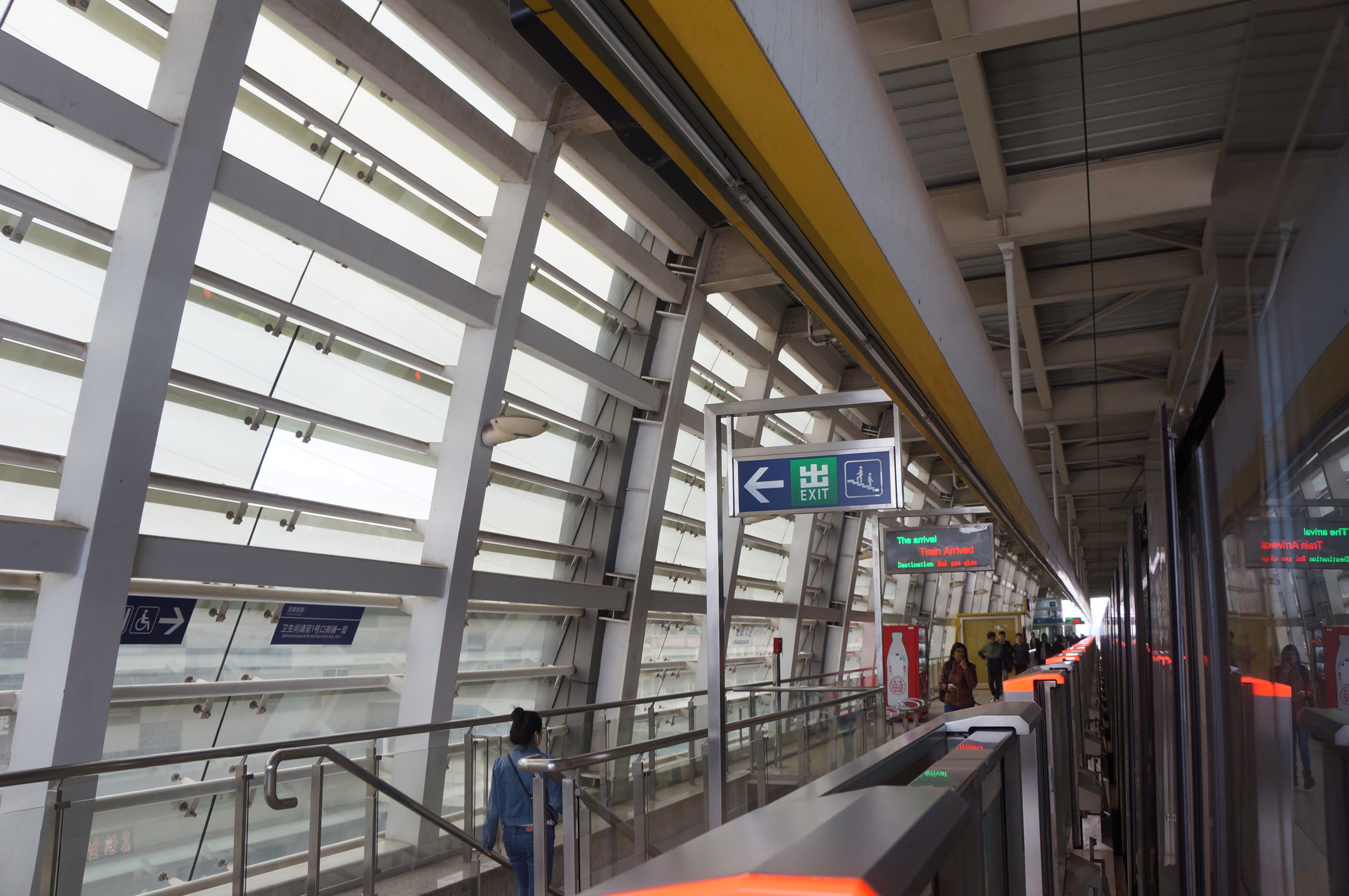

General information
- Location: East Tianyuan Road (G104); Jiangning District, Nanjing, Jiangsu; China
- Operated by: Nanjing Metro Co. Ltd.
- Line(s): Line 1

Construction
- Structure type: Elevated

Other information
- Station code: 104

History
- Opened: 28 May 2010

Services
Preceding station	Nanjing Metro	Following station
Tianyindadao towards Baguazhoudaqiaonan	Line 1	NMU / JIETT towards CPU

Longmiandadao station (simplified Chinese: 龙眠大道站; traditional Chinese: 龍眠大道站; pinyin: Lóngmiándàdào Zhàn) is a station of Line 1 of the Nanjing Metro. It began operations on 28 May 2010, as part of the southern extension of line 1 from Andemen to CPU.
