= Nanjing Medical University – Jiangsu Institute of Economic and Trade Technology station =

Nanjing Metro station

Nanjing Medical University – Jiangsu Institute of Economic and Trade Technology (NMU•JIETT) 南医大·江苏经贸学院
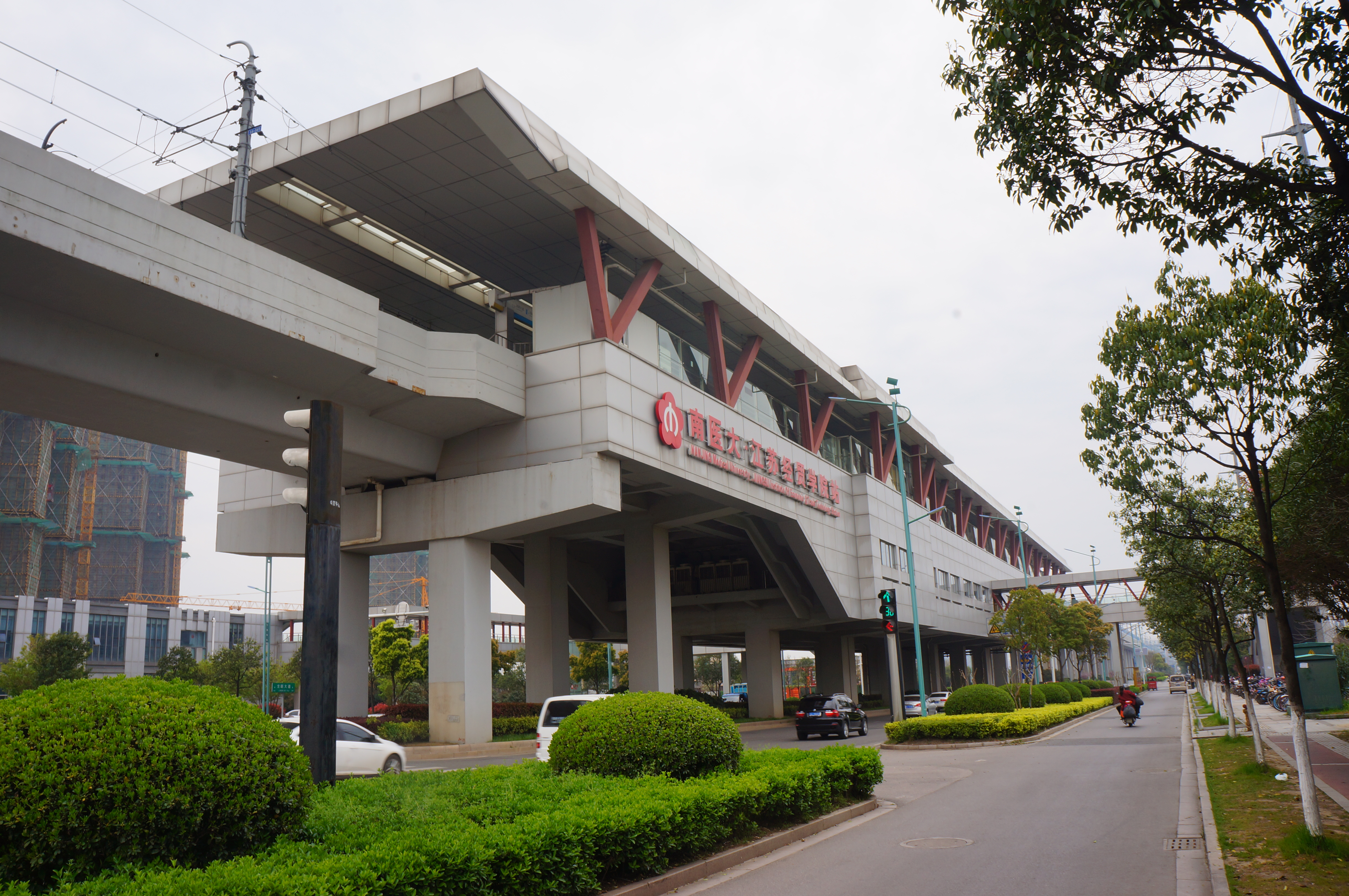

Chinese name
- Simplified Chinese: 南医大·江苏经贸学院站
- Traditional Chinese: 南醫大·江蘇經貿學院站
Transcriptions
Standard Mandarin
- Hanyu Pinyin: Nányīdà·Jiāngsū Jīngmào Xuéyuàn Zhàn

General information
- Location: Longmian Avenue (龙眠大道); Jiangning District, Nanjing, Jiangsu; China
- Coordinates: 31°56′01″N 118°53′25″E
- Operated by: Nanjing Metro Co. Ltd.
- Line: Line 1

Construction
- Structure type: Elevated

Other information
- Station code: 103

History
- Opened: 28 May 2010

Services
Preceding station	Nanjing Metro	Following station
Longmiandadao towards Baguazhoudaqiaonan	Line 1	NJCI towards CPU
Location

Nanjing Medical University – Jiangsu Institute of Economic and Trade Technology station (NMU•JIETT) (Chinese: 南医大·江苏经贸学院站) is a station of Line 1 of the Nanjing Metro. It began operations on 28 May 2010, as part of the southern extension of line 1 from Andemen to CPU.
