= Hedingqiao station =

Nanjing Metro station

Coordinates: 31°57′08″N 118°49′12″E

Hedingqiao 河定桥
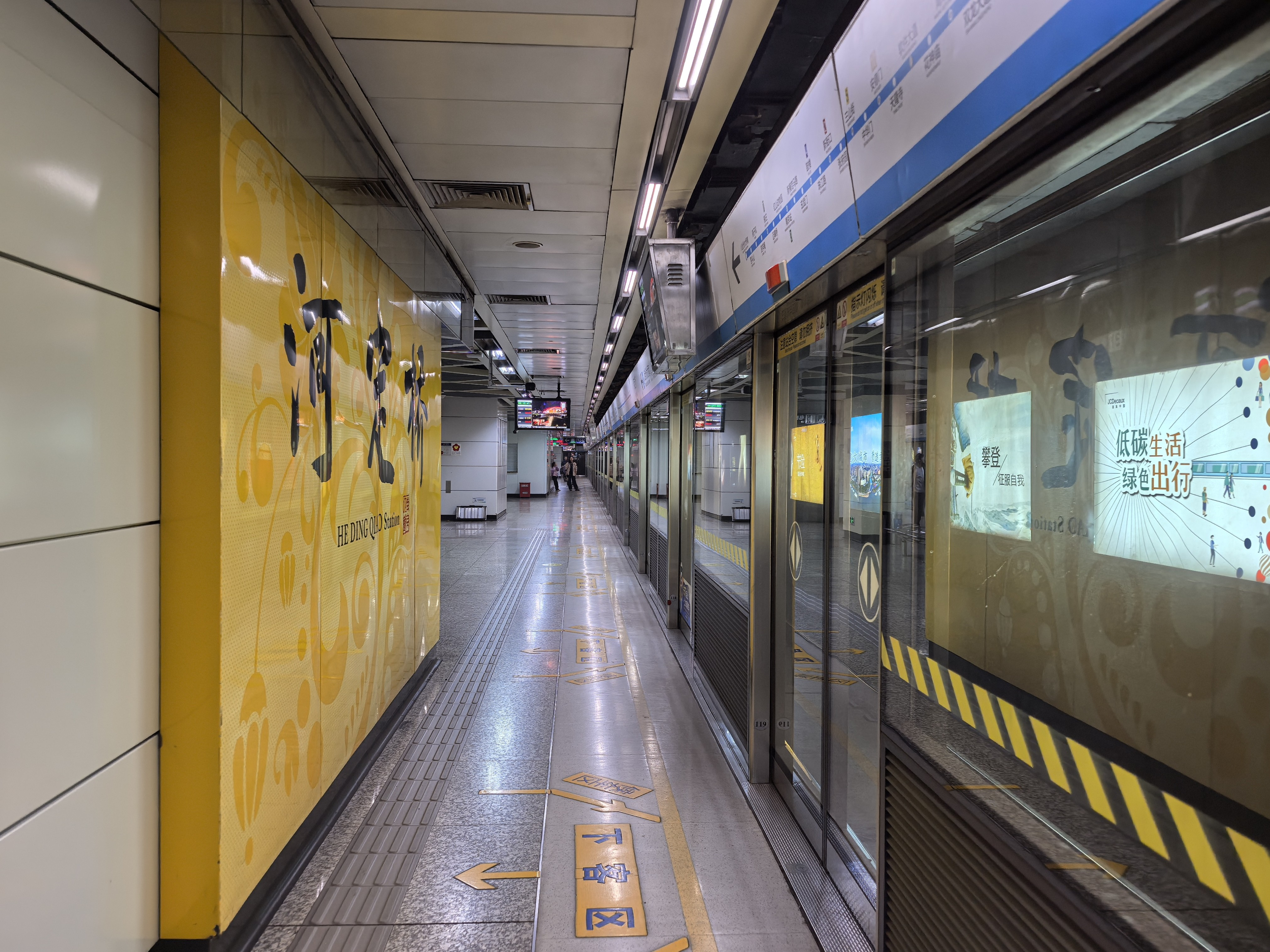
- Station platform

General information
- Location: Shuanglong Avenue (双龙大道) and Qinhuai Road (秦淮路); Jiangning District, Nanjing, Jiangsu; China
- Operated by: Nanjing Metro Co. Ltd.
- Line: Line 1

Construction
- Structure type: Underground

Other information
- Station code: 110

History
- Opened: 28 May 2010

Services
Preceding station	Nanjing Metro	Following station
Shuanglongdadao towards Baguazhoudaqiaonan	Line 1	Shengtailu towards CPU
Location

Hedingqiao station (simplified Chinese: 河定桥站; traditional Chinese: 河定橋站; pinyin: Hédìngqiáo Zhàn) is a station of Line 1 of the Nanjing Metro. It began operations on 28 May 2010, as part of the southern extension of line 1 from Andemen to CPU.
