= Zhujianglu station =

Nanjing Metro station

Zhujianglu 珠江路
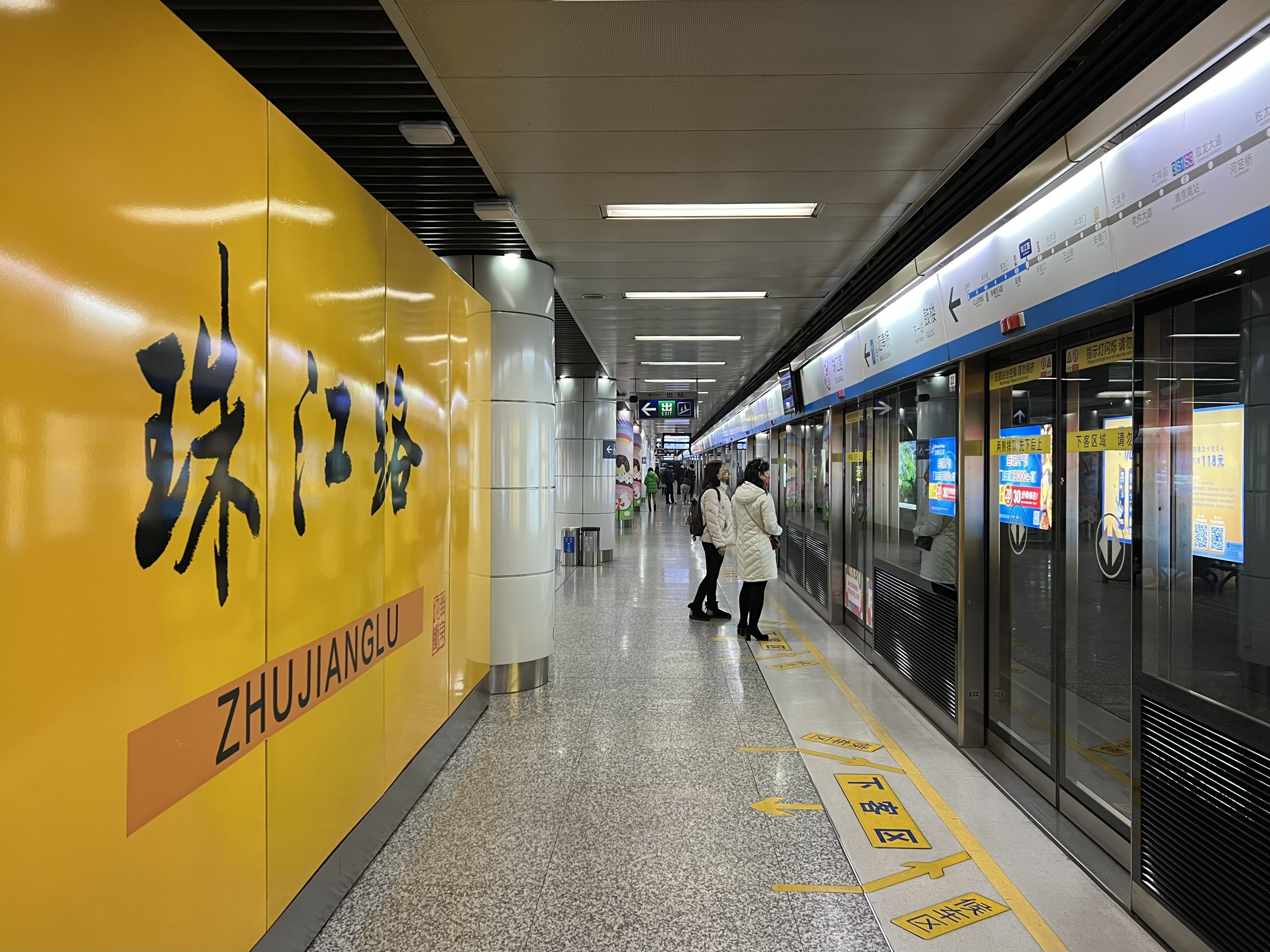

General information
- Other names: Zhujiang Road [station]
- Location: Zhongshan Road; Xuanwu District, Nanjing, Jiangsu; China
- Coordinates: 32°03′02″N 118°47′02″E
- Operator: Nanjing Metro Co. Ltd.
- Line: Line 1
- Platforms: 2 (1 island platform)

Construction
- Structure type: Underground

Other information
- Station code: 121

History
- Opened: 3 September 2005

Services
Preceding station	Nanjing Metro	Following station
Gulou towards Baguazhoudaqiaonan	Line 1	Xinjiekou towards CPU
Location

Zhujianglu station (Chinese: 珠江路站; pinyin: Zhūjiānglù Zhàn; lit. 'Pearl River Road station') is a station on Line 1 of the Nanjing Metro. It started operations on 3 September 2005 as part of the line's Phase I from Maigaoqiao to Andemen. (Note: The section from Andemen to Olympic Stadium that initially opened as Line 1 was re-designated as Line 10 when the latter opened in 2014.)

== Statistics ==
The station covers an area of 11,620 square meters (125,100 sq ft). It is 198.70 meters (651.9 ft) long and 21.20 meters (69.6 ft) wide. The roof of the station consists of thick soil which is 3.12 meters (10.2 ft) deep on average; the bottom of the station is about 15.16 meters (49.7 ft) deep.

== Around the station ==
- Fu Baoshi Memorial
- Jizhaoying Mosque
- John Rabe House
- Nanjing University Library
- Tong Ren Tower
