= Tong Ren Tower =

Building in Nanjing, Jiangsu, China

1 Zhujiang
- Interactive map of the 1 Zhujiang area
- Former names: Tong Ren Tower

General information
- Location: Nanjing, Jiangsu, China
- Coordinates: 32.0529058°N 118.7797947°E
- Construction started: 2003
- Completed: 2007

Height
- Architectural: 186 m (610 ft)
- Tip: 186 m (610 ft)

Technical details
- Floor count: 53

1 Zhujiang, formerly known as the Tong Ren Tower, is a building in Nanjing, Jiangsu, China. It is 186 meters (610 ft) tall with 53 floors. Construction began in 2003 and ended in 2007. The tower was designed by P & T Architects & Engineers Ltd. The building is used for offices, a hotel, and retail stores.

Before the 2003 tower, there was a 68-storey building design for this site, which began construction in 1993. However, it was cancelled in 1996.

== History ==
The Tong Ren Tower was developed by Nanjing International Tongren Development Company (Nanjing Tongren). It is located at Zhujiang Road in Xinjiekou, Nanjing. Work on the site began in 1993. As part of the site work, a historic two-story building was demolished to make way for the new skyscraper in 1994. The building, which was known locally as Jiao Zhuangyuan Building, was the private library and residence of Jiao Hong, a top scholar among the few from the city who managed to obtain the first rank (Zhuangyuan) in the Ming dynasty period. According to Yangtse Evening Post, it was demolished due to ongoing urban development projects and lack of cultural relics preservation awareness in China at that time.

Construction of the original building, however, was halted in 1996. It was then resumed by Nanjing Xinbai in August 2003, after the company decided to acquire the project's share in March that year. The purchase was mainly used to pay the debts of Nanjing Tongren. Nanjing Xinbai later financed the project by taking a CN¥100 million loan in 2005. The company stakes on the project were then transferred to Taizhou Xinpeng Real Estate Development Company in May 2006. Subsequently, the developer changed its name to Nanjing Zhujiang No. 1 Real Estate Development Company and the building renamed 1 Zhujiang in September 2006. While the tower was taking its shape that year, the nearby Zhujianglu Station, where the city's first metro line runs through, was being added with more entrances/exits to improve its passenger access, as it only had one access point when it began operation in 2005. One of the additions includes Entrance/Exit 4. It is located next to the building and was opened on October 21, 2006. Work on 1 Zhujiang was eventually taken over by Golden Eagle International Group in December 2007 and the building became fully operational on May 16, 2009.

== See also ==
- List of tallest buildings in China
