= Nanjing Communications Institute of Technology station =

Nanjing Metro station

Coordinates: 31°54′48″N 118°54′16″E

Nanjing Communications Institute of Technology 南京交院
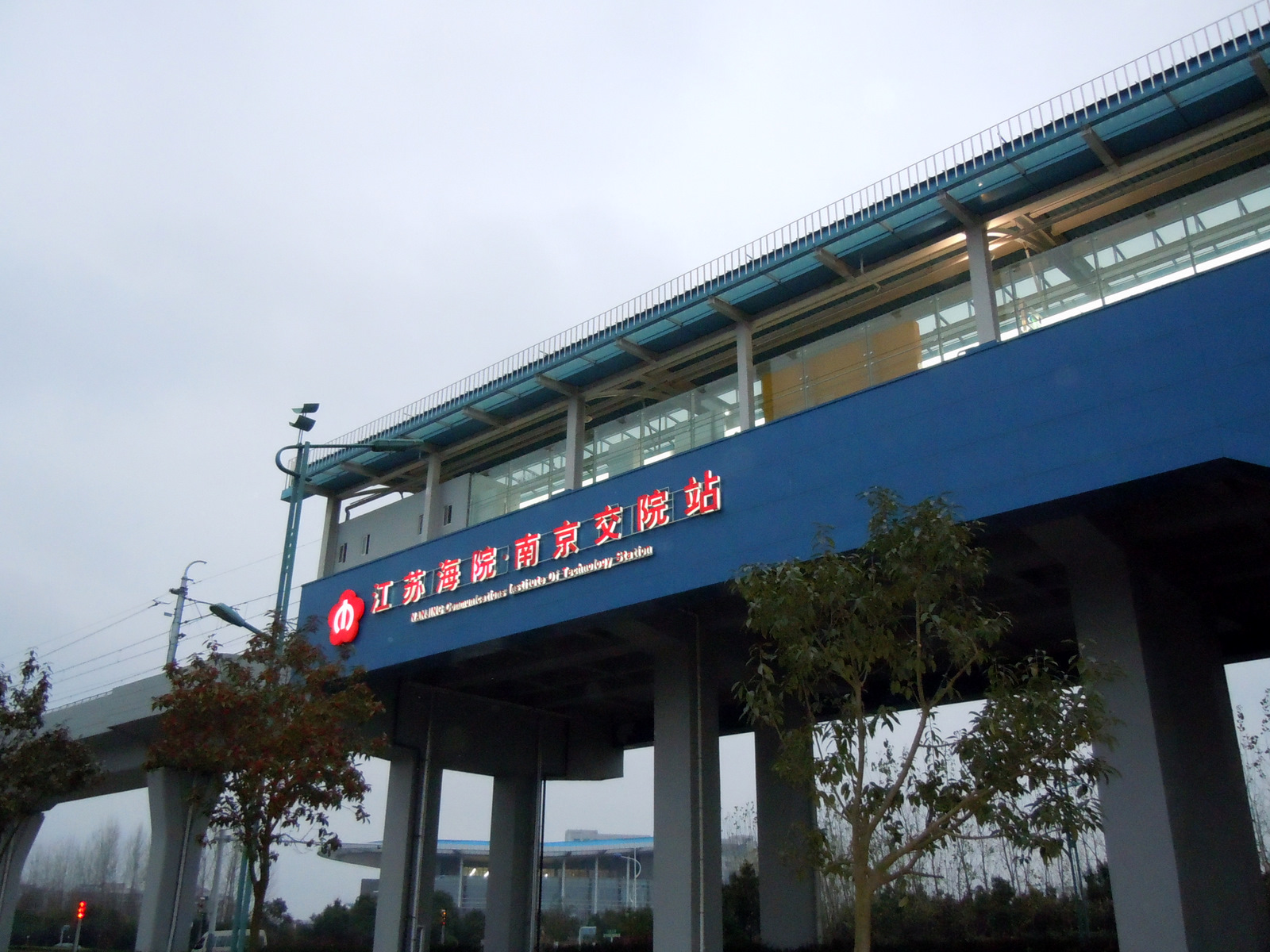

General information
- Location: Longmian Avenue (龙眠大道); Jiangning District, Nanjing, Jiangsu; China
- Operated by: Nanjing Metro Co. Ltd.
- Line(s): Line 1

Construction
- Structure type: Elevated

Other information
- Station code: 102

History
- Opened: 28 May 2010

Services
| Preceding station | Nanjing Metro | Following station |
|---|---|---|
| NMU / JIETT towards Baguazhoudaqiaonan | Line 1 | CPU Terminus |

Nanjing Communications Institute of Technology station (Chinese: 南京交院站; pinyin: Nánjīng Jiāoyuàn Zhàn) is a station of Line 1 of the Nanjing Metro. It began operations on 28 May 2010, as part of the southern extension of line 1 from Andemen to CPU.
