= Fu Baoshi Memorial =

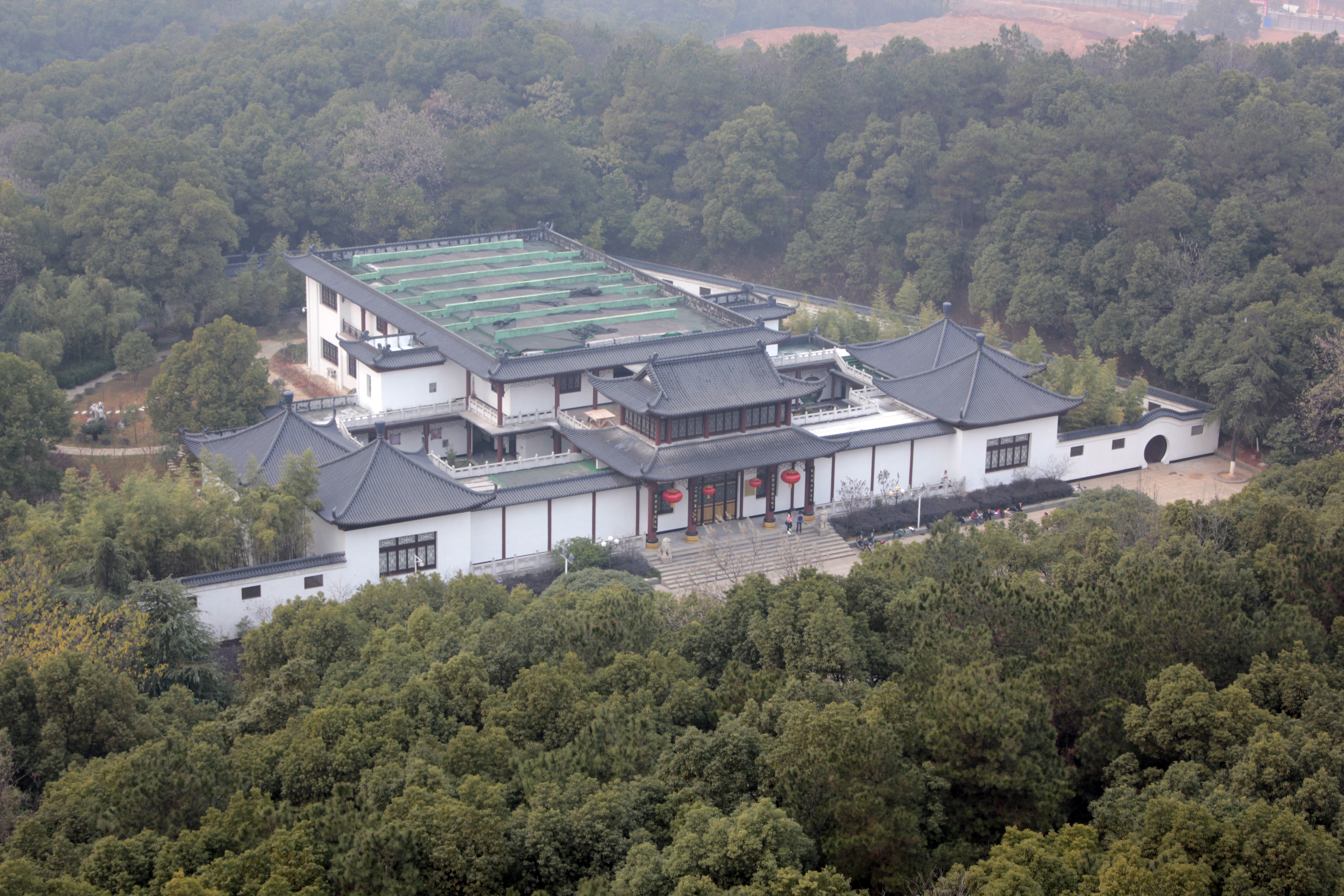
The Fu Baoshi Memorial Hall in Xinyu hosts a permanent exhibition of Fu Baoshi artwork

Fu Baoshi Memorial is located at 132nd Hankou West Road in Nanjing, China, where Fu Baoshi, a great art master born in 1904, lived. Not only did Fu create large amounts of Chinese painting and carving works but he also taught many talented artists. The tip of his writing brush is unique which is called "Baoshi Cun" by people. It was not until 1965 when he died that he gained more widespread recognition. During the Cultural Revolution, all the offspring he had were driven out of their home and then were scattered all around the world. In 1985, in memory of the 20-year anniversary of Fu's death, the government contributed to maintaining the old house and planned to build a memorial for Fu Baoshi. This memorial opened in 1987. Its first curator was Fu Ershi—Fu, Baoshi's son.

Fu Baoshi Memorial is built as a two-floor building with a bungalow attached to it and a courtyard. In the west of the main building stands a statue of Fu Baoshi. A sitting room, a drawing room, a bedroom and many other rooms next to the main building still keep the building style of MinGuo. Among the many exhibitions, stories about his life, many other reproductions of Fu's famous paintings and things are displayed.

This memorial aims to be the center of collecting, preserving and researching Fu's art works and last writing materials. In Taiwan, Fu has earned as good a reputation as Wu Changshuo, Qi Baishi and Zhang Daqian.

== Transportation ==
The memorial is accessible within walking distance west of Zhujianglu Station of Nanjing Metro.
