= Hongyundadao station =

Metro station in Nanjing, China

Hongyundadao 宏运大道
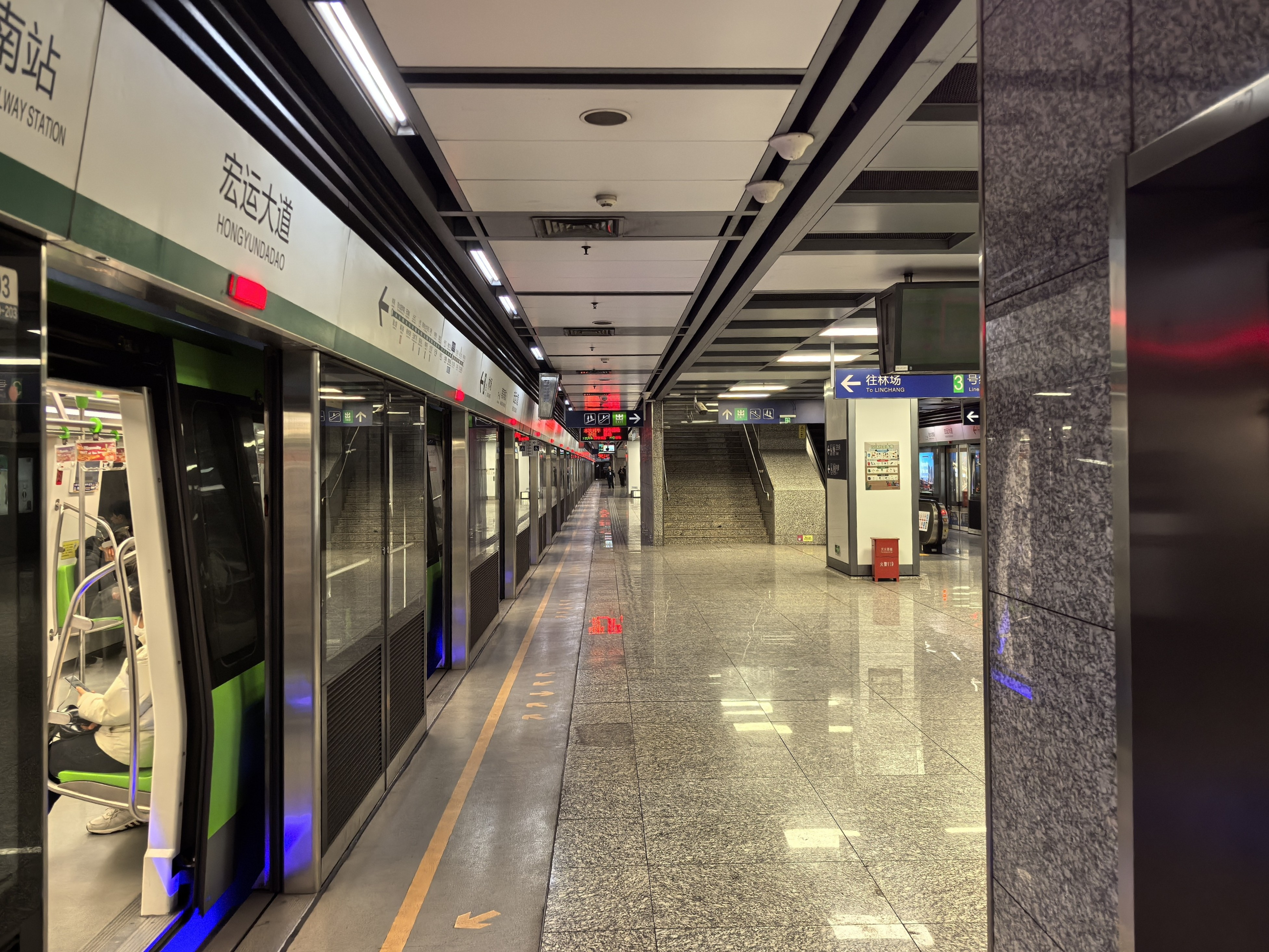

General information
- Location: Jiangning District, Nanjing, Jiangsu; China
- Operated by: Nanjing Metro Co. Ltd.
- Line: Line 3

Construction
- Structure type: Underground

Other information
- Station code: 323

History
- Opened: 1 April 2015

Services
Preceding station	Nanjing Metro	Following station
Nanjing South Railway Station towards Linchang	Line 3	Shengtaixilu towards Moling
Location

Hongyundadao station (Chinese: 宏运大道站) is a station on Line 3 of the Nanjing Metro. It started operations on 1 April 2015.
