= Line 1 (Nanjing Metro) =

Metro line in Nanjing, China

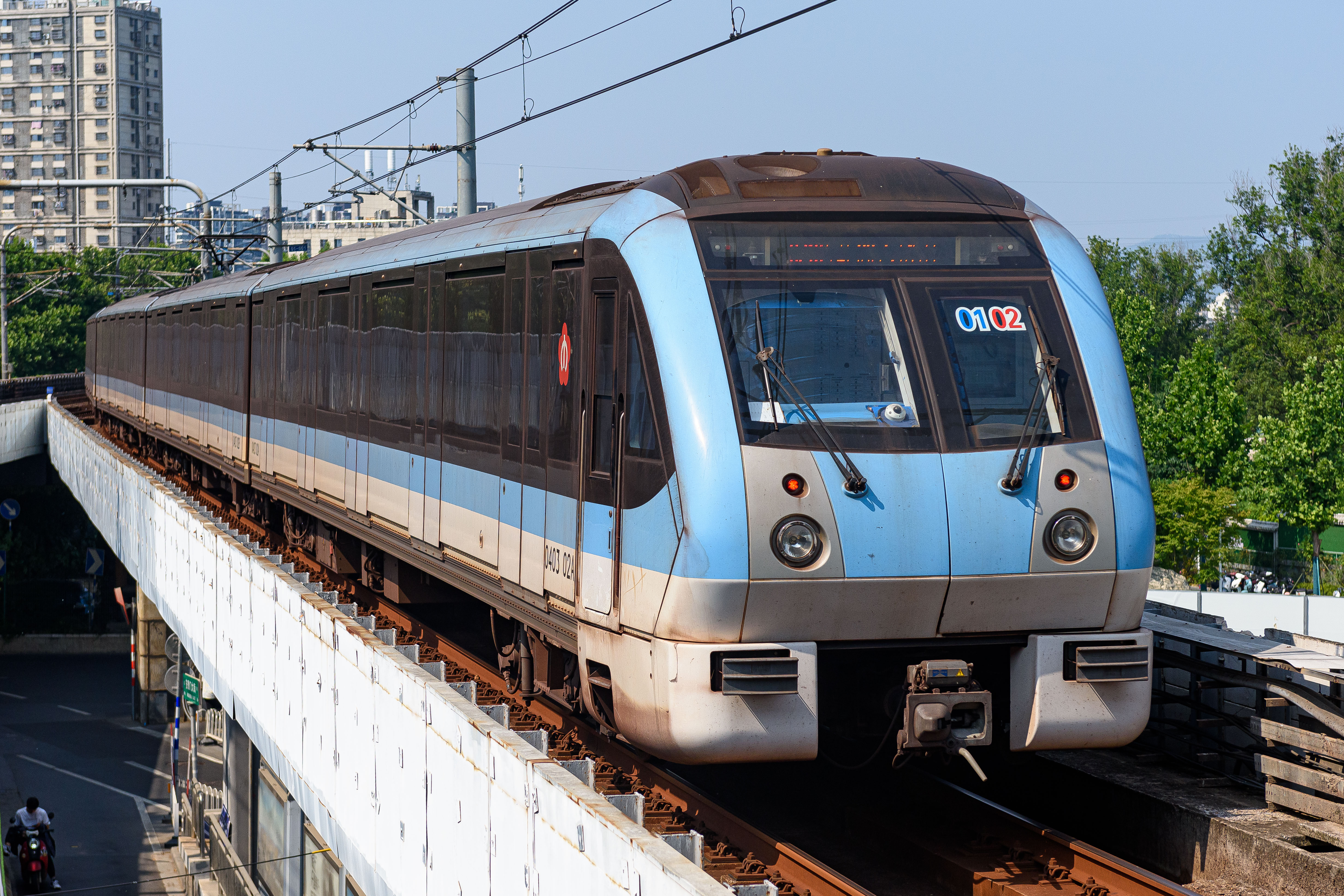
- A Line 1 train leaving Andemen

Overview
- Other name: Tianyin Line
- Status: In operation
- Locale: Jiangning, Yuhuatai, Qinhuai, Gulou, Xuanwu and Qixia districts Nanjing, Jiangsu
- Termini: Baguazhoudaqiaonan; CPU
- Stations: 32

Service
- Type: Rapid transit
- Rolling stock: Alstom Metropolis
- Daily ridership: 763,000 (2014 Avg.); 1.207 million (2019 Peak)

History
- Opened: September 3, 2005; 21 years ago

Technical
- Line length: 45.4 km (28.2 mi)
- Number of tracks: 2
- Character: Underground and elevated
- Track gauge: 1,435 mm (4 ft 8 1/2 in)
- Operating speed: 65km/h (Normal), 80km/h (Maximum)

Line 1 of the Nanjing Metro (Chinese: 南京地铁1号线; pinyin: Nánjīng Dìtiě Yī Hào Xiàn) is a north-south line and the first operating metro line in the Nanjing Metro system, inaugurated on September 3, 2005. After the opening of the 25.08 km (15.58 mi)-long south extension line on May 28, 2010, the total length of Line 1 is now 37.9 km (23.5 mi), running from CPU to Baguazhoudaqiaonan.

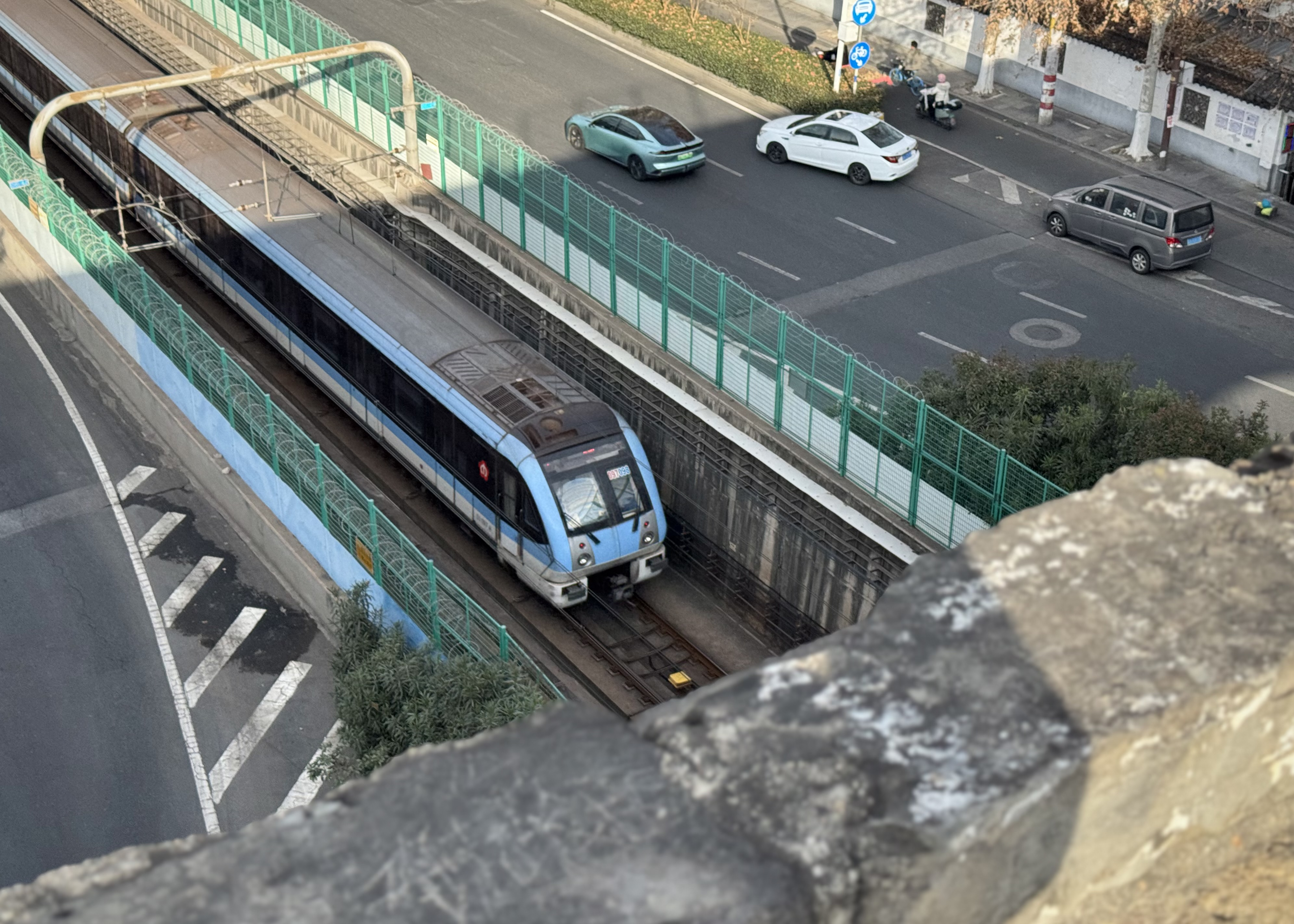
A Line 1 train that has just passed underneath Changgan Gate

== Opening timeline ==
Segment	Commencement	Length	Station(s)	Name	Note
Maigaoqiao — Andemen	3 September 2005	21.72 km (13.50 mi)	12	Phase 1 (1st section)	
Andemen — Olympic Stadium	3 September 2005	6.7 km (4.1632 mi)	4	Phase 1 (2nd section)	
Andemen — CPU	28 May 2010	25.08 km (15.58 mi)	14	Southern extension	
Nanjing South	28 June 2011	Infill station	1		
Andemen (Note: Not including Andemen (elevated) station.) — Olympic Stadium	1 July 2014	−6.7 km (−4.16 mi)	-4	Line 1 & 10 realignment project	Length and station decreases as this part no longer being part of Line 1
Baguazhoudaqiaonan — Maigaoqiao	28 December 2022	6.524 km (4.05 mi)	5	Northern extension	

== Route ==
This line mainly runs in a north-south direction. It starts at Baguazhoudaqiaonan station in the north, and continues southwards towards CPU station which is located at the southeastern side of Nanjing.

Of the total 21.72 km (13.50 mi) of the main line track, 14.33 km (8.90 mi) of the Line 1 track runs underground, while 7.39 km (4.59 mi) of the track run on or above the ground. Of the total 16 stations, 11 of them are underground stations while the other 5 are either ground or elevated stations. The southern extension line of Metro Line 1 has a total length of 25.08 km (15.58 mi) with 15 stations (excluding Andemen station). Of the total 15 stations, 8 of them are underground and the other 7 are all elevated stations.

On 28 May 2010, the identification color of Line 1 was changed from yellow to sky blue.

The northern extension covers a length of 7.2 km (4.5 mi) (6.7 km (4.2 mi) underground and 0.5 km (0.31 mi) elevated) with 5 underground stations (excluding Maigaoqiao station). It was completed in 2022.

== Stations ==

Service routes		Station name		Connections	Distance km		Location
Service routes		English	Chinese	Connections	Distance km		Location
●	●	Baguazhoudaqiaonan	八卦洲大桥南		---	0.000	Qixia
●	●	Badoushan	笆斗山		1.370	1.370	Qixia
●	●	Yanziji	燕子矶		1.292	2.662	Qixia
●	●	Jixiang'an	吉祥庵		1.115	3.777	Qixia
●	●	Xiaozhuang	晓庄	7	1.007	4.784	Qixia
●	●	Maigaoqiao	迈皋桥		1.910	6.694	Qixia
●	●	Hongshan Zoo	红山动物园		1.142	7.836	Xuanwu
●	●	Nanjing Railway Station	南京站	3 9 NJH	1.123	8.959	Gulou / Xuanwu
●	●	Xinmofanmalu	新模范马路		1.691	10.650	Gulou / Xuanwu
●	●	Xuanwumen	玄武门		1.061	11.711	Gulou / Xuanwu
●	●	Gulou	鼓楼	4	1.254	12.965	Gulou / Xuanwu
●	●	Zhujianglu	珠江路		0.862	13.827	Gulou / Xuanwu
●	●	Xinjiekou	新街口	2	1.147	14.974	Gulou / Xuanwu / Qinhuai
●	●	Zhangfuyuan	张府园		1.125	16.099	Qinhuai
●	●	Sanshanjie	三山街	5	0.909	17.008	Qinhuai
●	●	Zhonghuamen	中华门		1.914	18.922	Qinhuai / Yuhuatai
●	●	Andemen	安德门	10	2.093	21.015	Yuhuatai
●	●	Tianlongsi	天隆寺		1.455	22.470	Yuhuatai
●	●	Ruanjiandadao	软件大道		1.283	23.753	Yuhuatai
●	●	Huashenmiao	花神庙		1.076	24.829	Yuhuatai
●	●	Nanjing South Railway Station	南京南站	3 6 S1 S3 NKH	1.853	26.682	Yuhuatai / Jiangning
●	●	Shuanglongdadao	双龙大道		2.276	28.958	Jiangning
●	●	Hedingqiao	河定桥		1.345	30.303	Jiangning
	●	Shengtailu	胜太路		0.904	31.207	Jiangning
	●	Baijiahu	百家湖		1.332	32.539	Jiangning
	●	Xiaolongwan	小龙湾		1.475	34.014	Jiangning
	●	Zhushanlu	竹山路	5 (Note: Virtual transfer with line 5 – For passengers transfer within 30 minutes after exiting with a Passenger Code or a Public Transit Card, continuous billing is adopted; Passengers with token need to transfer just by putting the ticket into recycling port and afterwards repurchase a ticket; Passengers with UnionPay Quick Pass Card headed by 62 or Mobile Pay can transfer just by tapping in again after exiting.)	1.135	35.149	Jiangning
	●	Tianyindadao	天印大道		1.919	37.068	Jiangning
	●	Longmiandadao	龙眠大道		1.312	38.380	Jiangning
	●	NMU / JIETT	南医大·江苏经贸学院		1.550	39.930	Jiangning
	●	NJCI	南京交院		2.720	42.650	Jiangning
	●	CPU	中国药科大学		1.964	34.614	Jiangning
