= Jizhaoying Mosque =

Mosque in Nanjing, Jiangsu, China

- 吉兆营清真寺
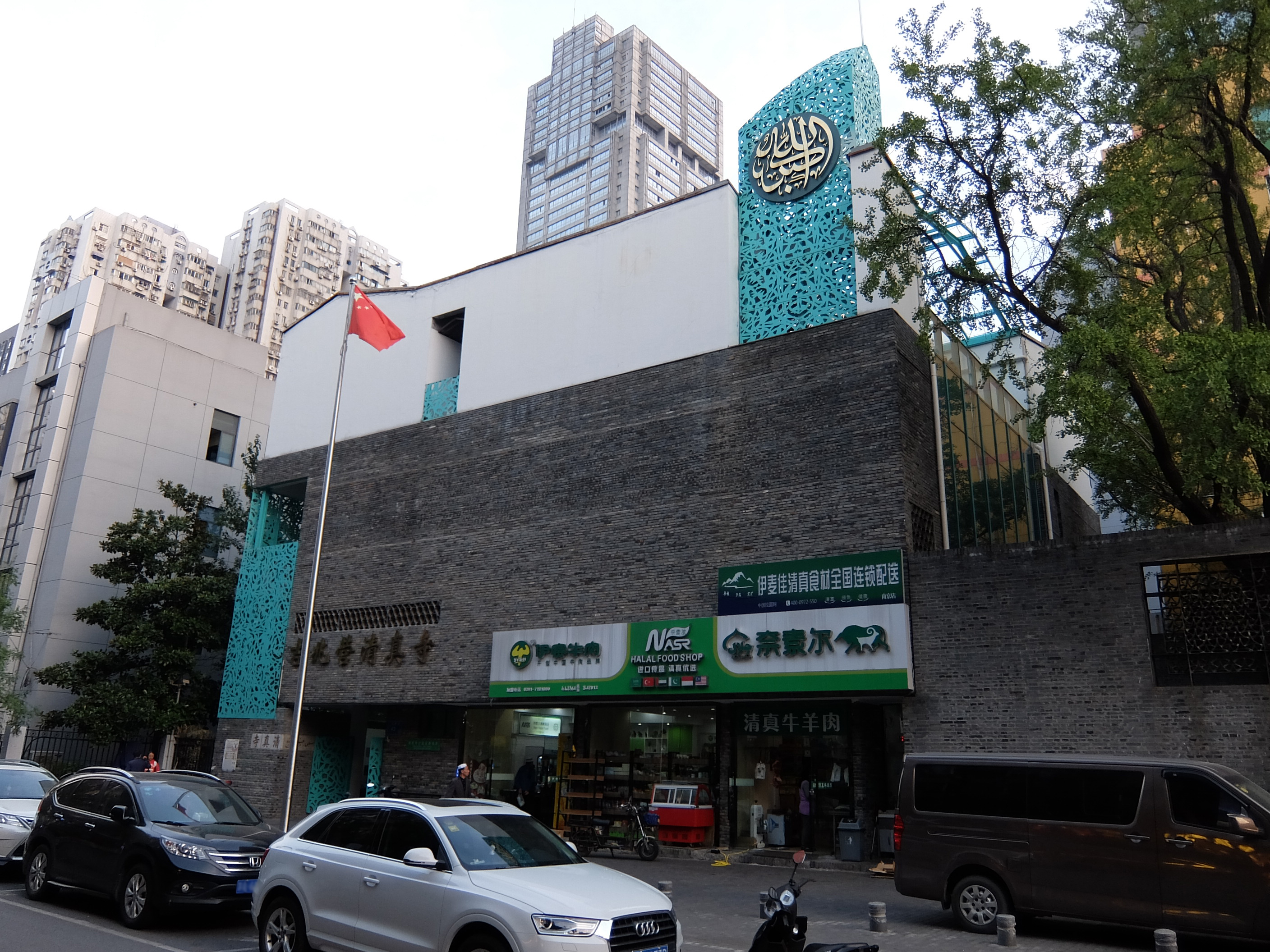

- Location of the mosque in Jiangsu

Religion
- Affiliation: Sunni Islam
- Ecclesiastical or organizational status: Mosque
- Status: Active

Location
- Location: Xuanwu, Nanjing, Jiangsu
- Country: China
- Interactive map of Jizhaoying Mosque
- Coordinates: 32°3′8″N 118°47′8″E

Architecture
- Architect: Ma Xiaodong (1987)
- Type: Mosque
- Completed: 1912 (rebuild?); 1987 (current)
- Site area: 815.1 m^{2} (8,774 sq ft)

The Jizhaoying Mosque (simplified Chinese: 吉兆营清真寺; traditional Chinese: 吉兆營清真寺; pinyin: Jízhàoyíng Qīngzhēnsì) is a mosque in Xuanwu District, Nanjing, in the Jiangsu province of China.

== Overview ==
The prayer hall of the mosque was rebuilt in 1912. In 1987, the mosque underwent renovation with funds raised by the Urban Islamic Association in Nanjing.

The current 1987 building of the mosque was designed by Ma Xiaodong. The mosque complex covers an area of 815.1 square metres (8,774 sq ft). It has a total of four floors and includes a guardroom, kitchen, meeting hall, restroom, main prayer hall, shower room, wudu, reception room, imam's office, meeting room and administration office.

== Transportation ==
The mosque is accessible within walking distance northeast of Zhujianglu Station of Nanjing Metro.

== Gallery ==
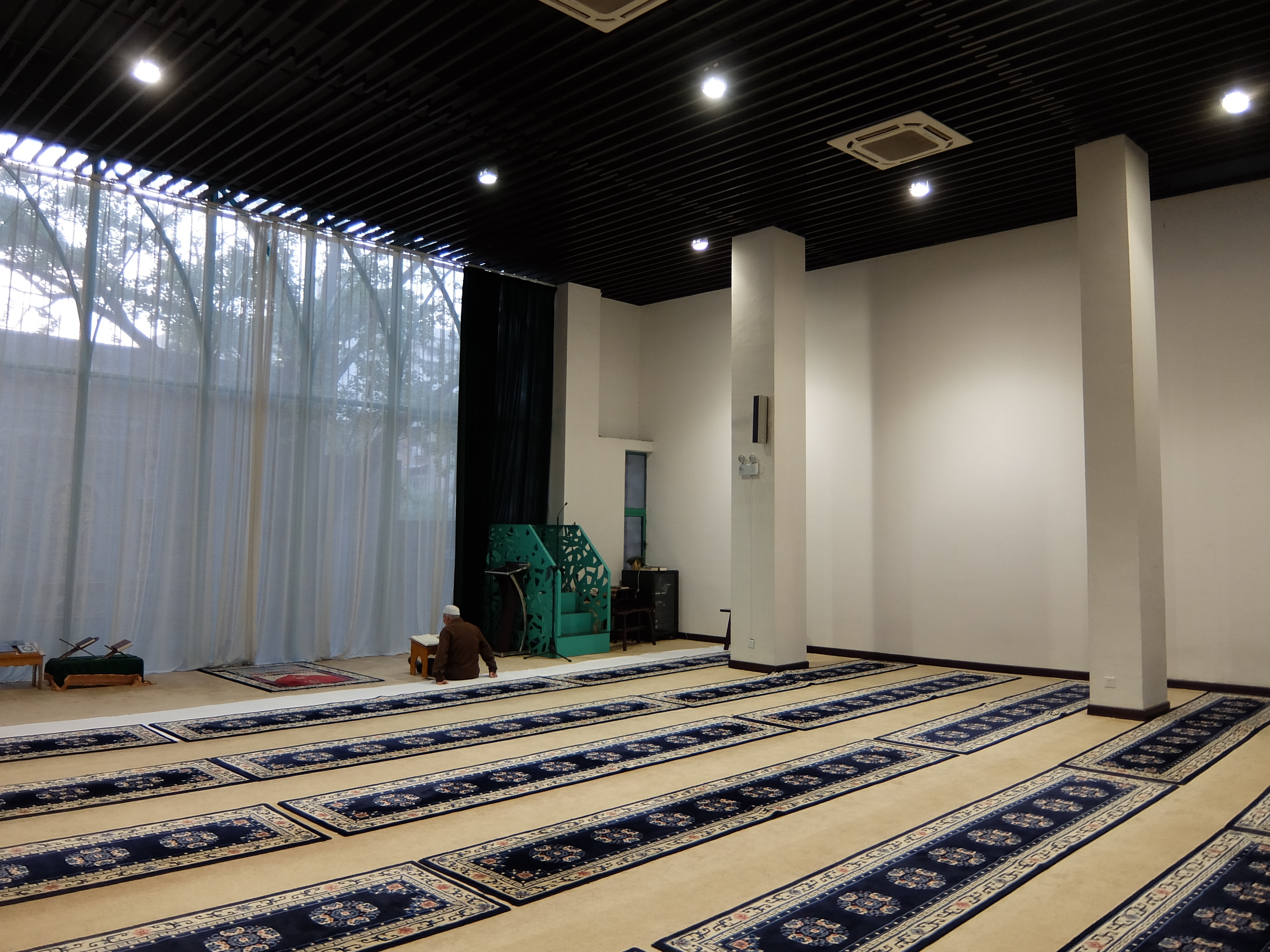
The mosque prayer hall

== See also ==
Jizhaoying Mosque
- Traditional Chinese: 吉兆營清真寺
- Simplified Chinese: 吉兆营清真寺
Transcriptions
Standard Mandarin
- Hanyu Pinyin: Jízhàoyíng Qīngzhēnsì

- Islam in China
- List of mosques in China
