= Nanjing University Library =

Library in Nanjing, Jiangsu, China

- 南京大学图书馆
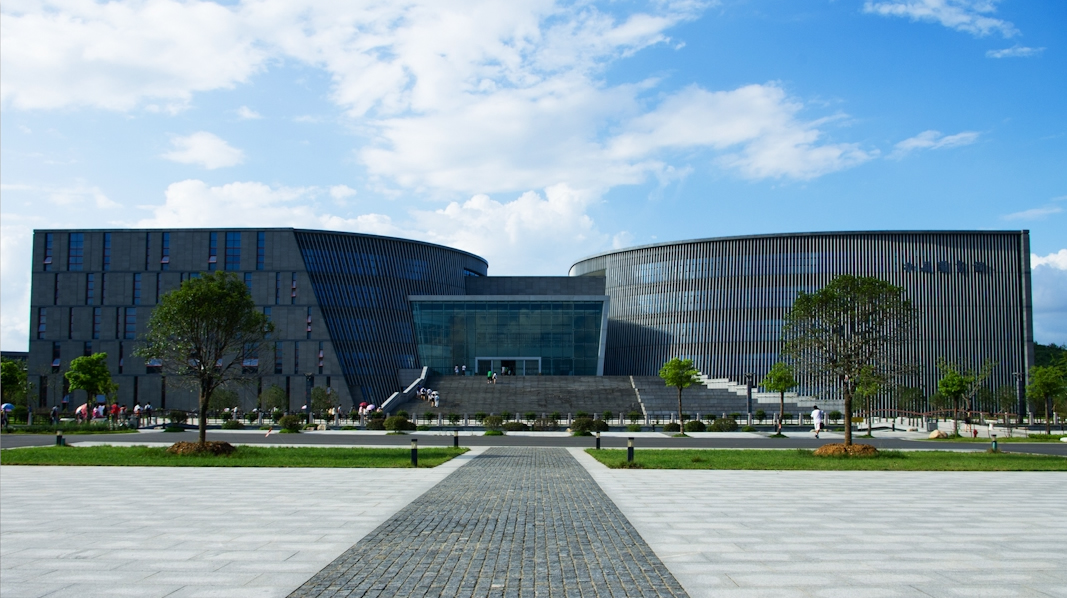
- Nanjing University Library in Xianlin campus
- 32.05456400581642°N 118.78131369368775°E
- Location: Nanjing, China
- Type: academic library

Other information
- Affiliation: Nanjing University

The Nanjing University Library, owned by Nanjing University, is a library in Nanjing, China, with a long history. According to its official website, the library is home to about 400 thousand ancient thread-bound Chinese books, and its total collection as of 2014 had reached 5.77 million. The library is very popular with students, with some controversy emerging due to long queues for study spaces and competition for seats. This issue was addressed in 2016, however, with the introduction of an online seat-booking system.

== Transportation ==
The library in Gulou campus is accessible within walking distance north west of Zhujianglu Station of Nanjing Metro, and in Xianlin campus is near Nanda Xianlin Station.

== See also ==
- List of libraries in China
