= Gaozi South railway station =

Railway station in Jiangsu, People's Republic of China

Gaozi South railway station (Chinese: 高资南站) is a railway station of Shanghai-Nanjing Intercity Railway located in Jiangsu, People's Republic of China.
