= Yuhuatai, Nanjing =

Yuhuatai 雨花台区
- District
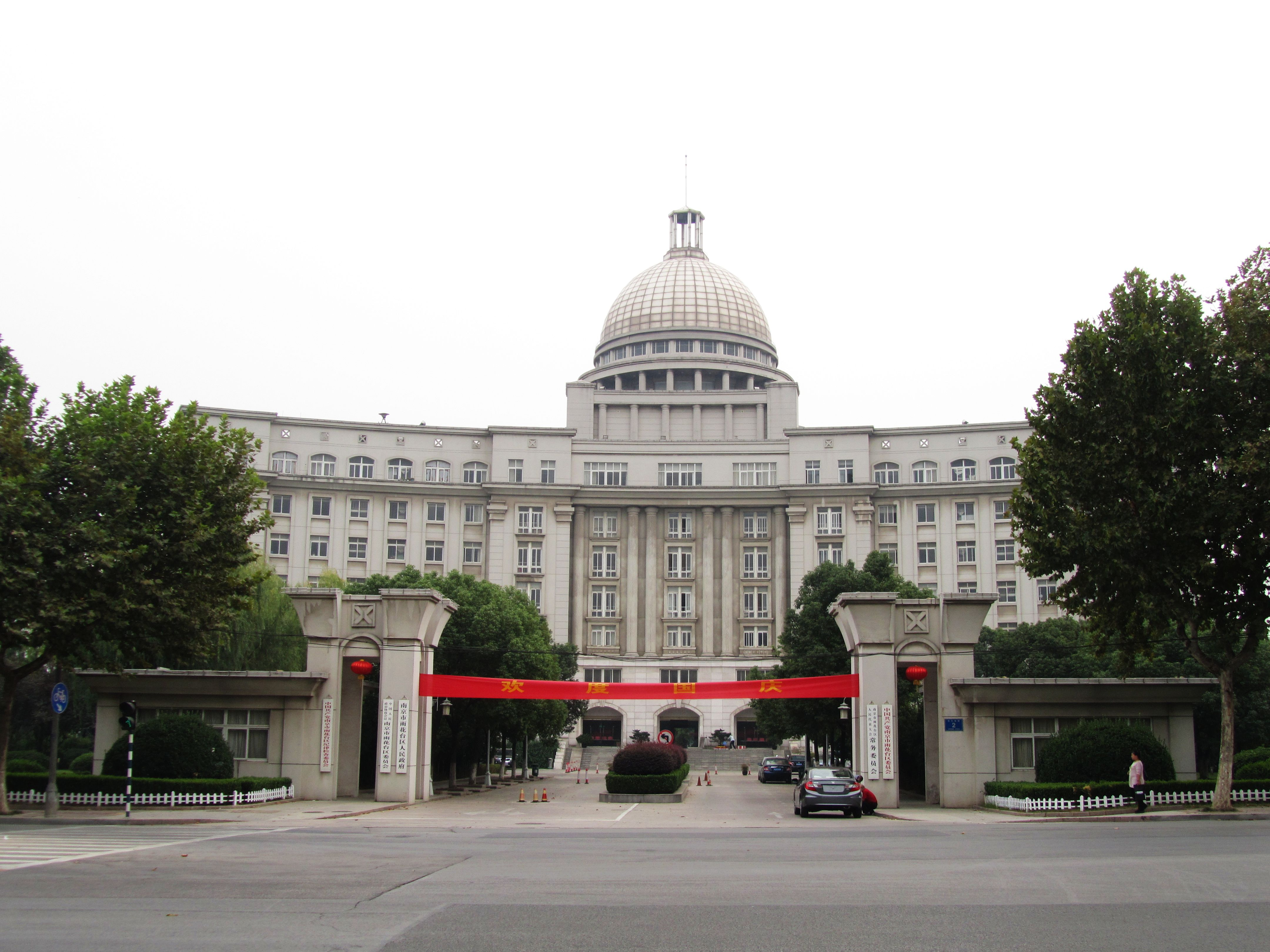
- Yuhuatai District Government Office

- Location in Jiangsu
- Coordinates: 31°56′24″N 118°42′06″E
- Country: People's Republic of China
- Province: Jiangsu
- Sub-provincial city: Nanjing

Area
  - Total: 132.39 km^{2} (51.12 sq mi)

Population (2020)
  - Total: 608,780
  - Density: 4,598.4/km^{2} (11,910/sq mi)
- Time zone: UTC+8 (China Standard)
- Postal code: 210012
Nanjing district map
Subdivisions of Nanjing, Jiangsu
City Proper
1	Xuanwu
2	Qinhuai
3	Jianye
4	Gulou
5	Yuhuatai
6	Qixia
Suburban
7	Jiangning
8	Pukou
9	Luhe
Rural
10	Lishui
11	Gaochun

Yuhuatai (Chinese: 雨花台区; pinyin: Yǔhuātái Qū) is one of 11 districts of Nanjing, the capital of Jiangsu province, China.

== Geography ==
Yuhuatai District is located in the south of the main city of Nanjing, in the lower reaches of the Yangtze River, bordering Jiangning District in the east and south, facing Pukou District across the Yangtze River in the west, and bordering Qinhuai District and Jianye District in the north, covering an area of 132.39 square kilometers (excluding the river area).

== Administrative divisions ==
In the present, Yuhuatai District has 7 subdistricts.

7 Subdistricts

- Yuhuaxincun (雨花新村街道)
- Ningnan (宁南街道)
- Xishanqiao (西善桥街道)
- Banqiao (板桥街道)
- Tiexinqiao (铁心桥街道)
- Meishan (梅山街道)
- Saihongqiao (赛虹桥街道)

== Transportation ==
- Nanjing South railway station

== See also ==
- Yuhuatai Memorial Park of Revolutionary Martyrs
