= Andemen station =

Nanjing Metro interchange station

Coordinates: 31°59′33″N 118°45′43″E

Andemen 安德门
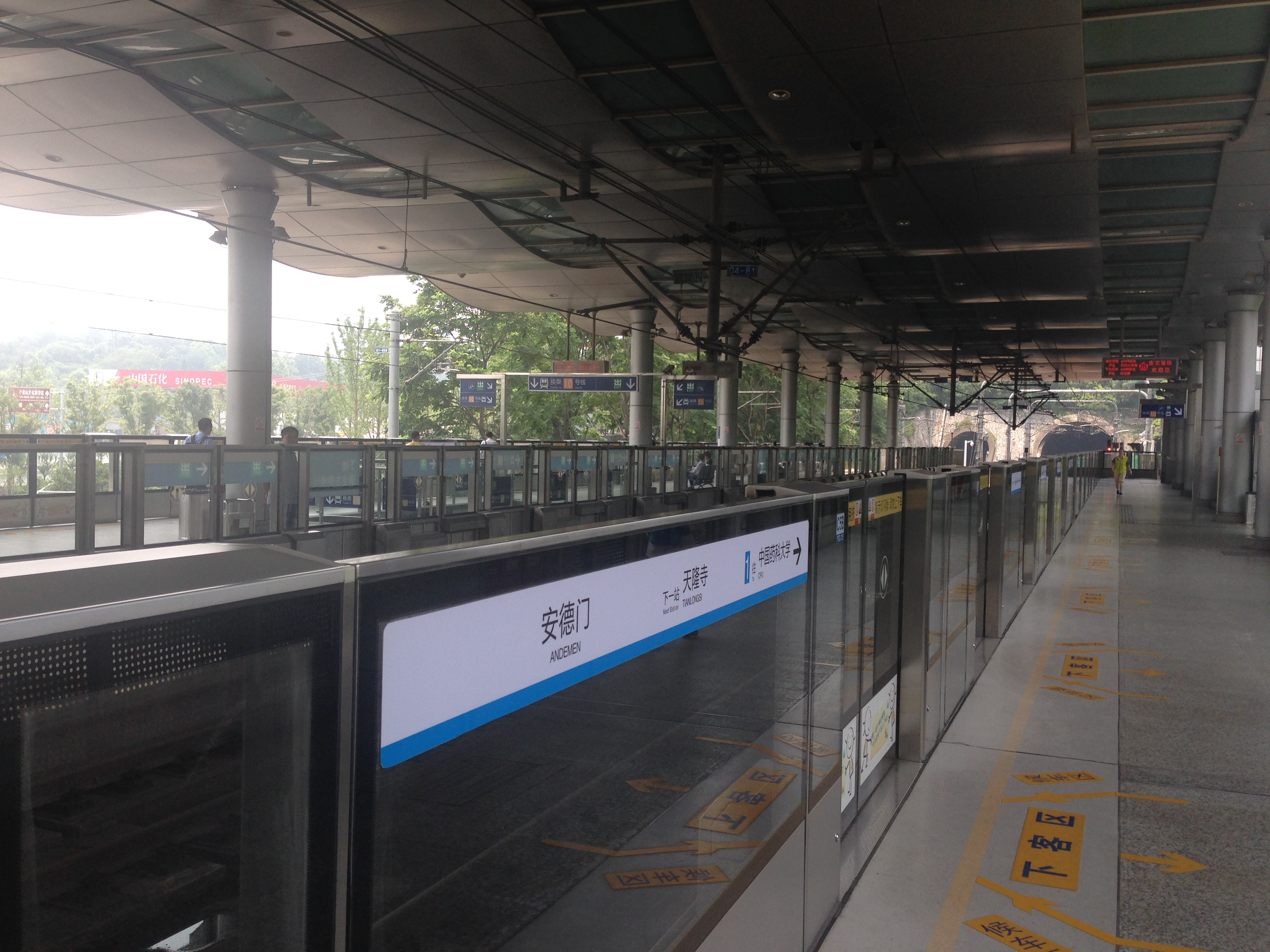
- The tracks and platforms at Andemen Station in 2015

General information
- Location: Yuhuatai District, Nanjing, Jiangsu; China
- Operated by: Nanjing Metro Co. Ltd.
- Lines: Line 1; Line 10

Construction
- Structure type: Elevated (Line 1); Underground (Line 10)

Other information
- Station code: 116(Line 1) 1011(Line 10)

History
- Opened: 3 September 2005 (Line 1); 1 July 2014 (Line 10)

Services
Preceding station	Nanjing Metro	Following station
Zhonghuamen towards Baguazhoudaqiaonan	Line 1	Tianlongsi towards CPU
Gongqingtuanlu towards Andemen	Line 10	Xiaohang towards Yushanlu
Location

Andemen station (simplified Chinese: 安德门站; traditional Chinese: 安德門站; pinyin: Āndémén Zhàn) is a transfer station of Line 1 and Line 10 of the Nanjing Metro. It started operations on 3 September 2005 as part of Line 1's Phase I that ran north to Maigaoqiao; the previous branch of Line 1 from this station to Olympic Stadium was re-designated as Line 10 when that line opened on 1 July 2014, and Andemen became the eastern terminus of Line 10 at that time.

The station is located in Nanjing's Yuhuatai District; the Line 1 station is situated between Xiaohang Road (小行路) to the west and Andemen Street (安德门大街) to the east, while the Line 10 station is situated along the latter thoroughfare. The two-level station has a total area of 4,860.80 m^{2} (52,321.2 sq ft), and the Line 1 station is elevated with two side platforms, while the Line 10 station is underground with an island platform.

== Station structure ==
=== Line 1 ===
2F; Platforms	Line 1 to Baguazhoudaqiaonan (Zhonghuamen)
2F; Platforms	Island platform
2F; Platforms	No regular service
2F; Platforms	Line 1 to CPU (Tianlongsi)
2F; Platforms	Side platform
1F; Concourse	Exits, Customer service, Vending machines, Transfer passage to Line 10

=== Line 10 ===
B1; Concourse	Exits, Customer service, Vending machines, Transfer passage to Line 1
B2; Platforms	Line 10 to Dongqilu (Gongqingtuanlu)
B2; Platforms	Island platform
B2; Platforms	Line 10 to Yushanlu (Xiaohang)
