= China Pharmaceutical University station =

Nanjing Metro station

Coordinates: 31°53′52″N 118°54′50″E

China Pharmaceutical University 中国药科大学
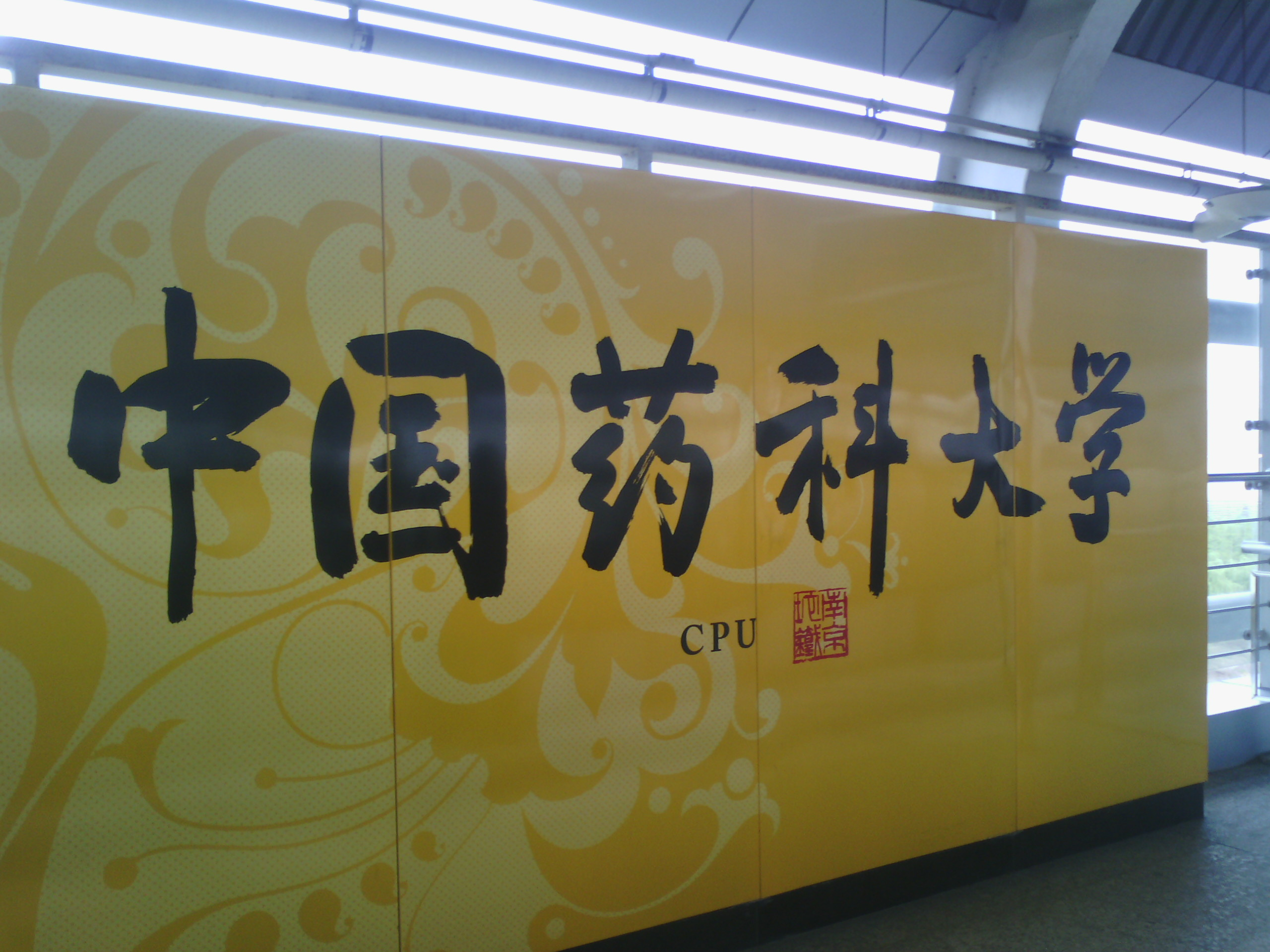

Chinese name
- Simplified Chinese: 中国药科大学站
- Traditional Chinese: 中國藥科大學站
Transcriptions
Standard Mandarin
- Hanyu Pinyin: Zhōngguó Yàokē Dàxué Zhàn

General information
- Location: Longmian Avenue (龙眠大道); Jiangning District, Nanjing, Jiangsu; China
- Operated by: Nanjing Metro Co. Ltd.
- Line(s): Line 1

Construction
- Structure type: Elevated

Other information
- Station code: 101

History
- Opened: 28 May 2010

Services
Preceding station	Nanjing Metro	Following station
NJCI towards Baguazhoudaqiaonan	Line 1	Terminus

China Pharmaceutical University station (Chinese: 中国药科大学站) is a station of Line 1 of the Nanjing Metro. It began operations on 28 May 2010, as part of the southern extension of line 1 from Andemen to this station. The rail depot for the southern extension of Line 1 is located to the west of the station.
