= Nanjing South–Xianlin railway =

Railway line in Jiangsu, China

Xianning Railway 仙宁铁路
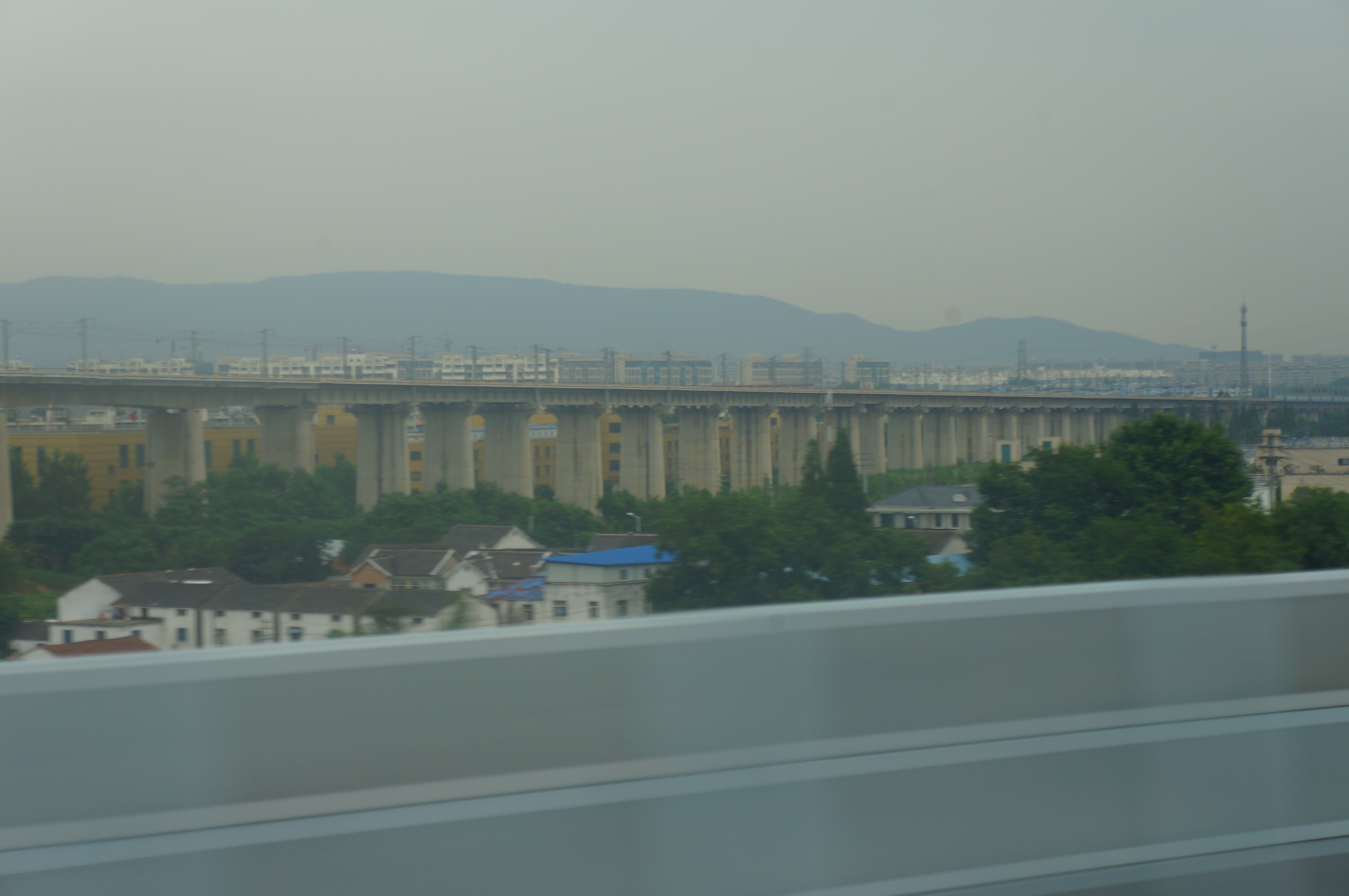

Overview
- Other name(s): Nanjing South–Xianlin railway
- Status: Operating
- Locale: Nanjing
- Termini: Nanjing South railway station; Xianlin railway station
- Stations: 3 (1 not open for passengers)

Service
- Type: High-speed rail

Technical
- Line length: 22.577 kilometres (14.029 mi)
- Track gauge: 1,435 mm (4 ft 8 1/2 in)
- Electrification: 25 kV AC

The Nanjing South–Xianlin railway, also known as a contraction as the Xianning Railway (Chinese: 仙宁铁路), is a line in Nanjing, the capital of Jiangsu province, China. It connects Nanjing South railway station to the Shanghai–Nanjing intercity railway at Xianlin railway station (formerly known as Xianxi station), passing through the Nanjing districts of Yuhuatai, Jiangning, Qinhuai, Xuanwu and Qixia, with a total length of 22.577 kilometres. The line was opened in about 2012. Zijinshandong railway station was established as the only intervening station on the line, but it has not been opened for cost reasons, although it was substantially finished.
