= Crescent Lake =

Crescent Lake or Lake Crescent may refer to:

== United States ==
Alphabetical by state

Lakes:

- Crescent Lake (Alaska)
- Crescent Lake (Arizona)
- Crescent Lake (Florida), in Putnam and Flagler counties
- Crescent Lake (Pensacola), Florida
- Crescent Lake (Rattlesnake Pond), Maine
- Crescent Lake (Waterford Township, Michigan)
- Crescent Lake (Minnesota)
- Crescent Lake, in Park County, Montana
- Crescent Lake, in Wolfeboro, New Hampshire
- Crescent Lake (Oregon)
- Crescent Lake (Utah)
- Lake Crescent, Washington

Settlements:

- Crescent Lake, Oregon, a census-designated place

== Worldwide ==
Alphabetical by country

- Lake Crescent (Tasmania), Australia
- Crescent Lake, near Roberts Arm, Newfoundland and Labrador, Canada
- Crescent Lake (Dunhuang), in Dunhuang, Gansu, China
- Crescent Lake (Ho Chi Minh City), in Phú Mỹ Hưng Urban Area, Ho Chi Minh City, Vietnam
- Yueya Lake (Nanjing) (Crescent Moon Lake), Nanjing, Jiangsu, China
