= Yueyahu =

Yueyahu (Chinese: 月牙湖) may refer to these places in China:

- Yueyahu Subdistrict, in Qinhuai District, Nanjing, Jiangsu
- Yueyahu Township, in Xingqing District, Yinchuan, Ningxia

== See also ==
- Yueya Lake (disambiguation)
