= Yueya Lake =

Yueya Lake may refer to:

- Yueya Lake (Nanjing), lake in Nanjing, Jiangsu, China
- Yueyaquan, lake in Dunhuang, Gansu, China

== See also ==
- Yueyahu (disambiguation)
