= Daminglu station =

Nanjing Metro station

Daminglu 大明路
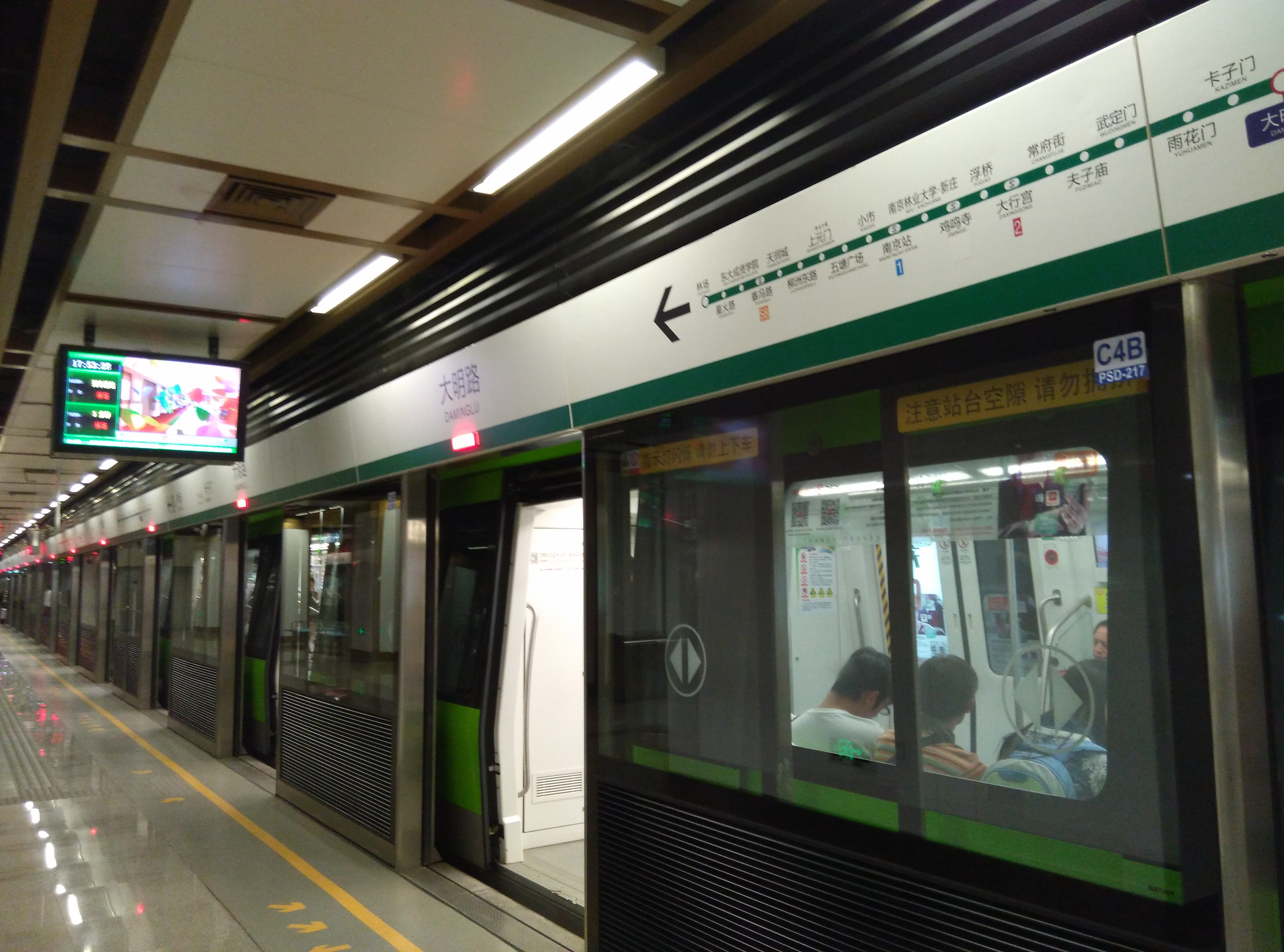
- The Platform

General information
- Location: Qinhuai District, Nanjing, Jiangsu; China
- Coordinates: 31.9881°N 118.79489°E
- Operated by: Nanjing Metro Co. Ltd.
- Line(s): Line 3

Construction
- Structure type: Underground

Other information
- Station code: 320

History
- Opened: 1 April 2015

Services
| Preceding station | Nanjing Metro | Following station |
|---|---|---|
| Kazimen towards Linchang | Line 3 | Mingfaguangchang towards Mozhoudonglu |
Location

Daminglu station (Chinese: 大明路站) is a station on Line 3 of the Nanjing Metro. It started operating on 1 April 2015.
