= Jinjue Mosque =

Mosque in Nanjing, Jiangsu, China

- 净觉寺
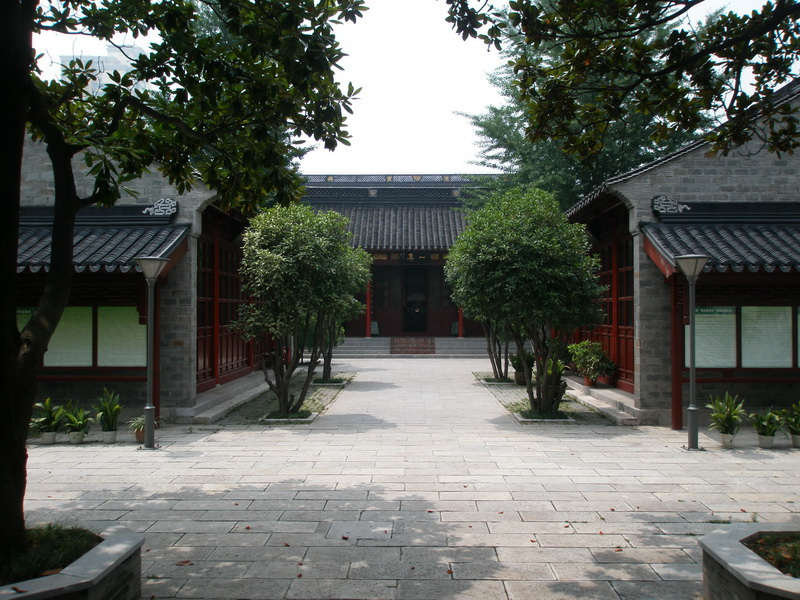

- Location of the mosques in Jiangsu

Religion
- Affiliation: Sunni Islam
- Ecclesiastical or organizational status: Mosque
- Status: Active

Location
- Location: 28 Shengzhou Road, Qinhuai, Nanjing, Jiangsu
- Country: China
- Interactive map of Jinjue Mosque
- Coordinates: 32°01′26″N 118°47′00″E

Architecture
- Type: Mosque
- Style: Chinese; Islamic
- Completed: 1392 CE (original); 1430 (renovations)
- Site area: 4,000 m^{2} (43,000 sq ft)

Jinjue Mosque
- Traditional Chinese: 淨覺寺
- Simplified Chinese: 净觉寺
Transcriptions
Standard Mandarin
- Hanyu Pinyin: Jìngjué Sì

The Jinjue Mosque (simplified Chinese: 净觉寺; traditional Chinese: 淨覺寺; pinyin: Jìngjué Sì) is a mosque in Qinhuai District, Nanjing City, in the Jiangsu province of China.

== History ==
Construction of the mosque was completed in 1392, under an order of Hongwu Emperor of the Ming Dynasty issued in 1388. During the Xuande Emperor rule, following the mosque's destruction by fire, Zheng He appealed for the mosque to undergo renovation and the first significant repairs took place in 1430. Further expansion and repairs were commissioned by the Jiajing Emperor in the mid-sixteenth century. Other repairs occurred in 1492, 1877, 1879, 1957, 1982, 1984, and 2002.

By the late 19th century, the mosque site was reduced from 107 hectares (264 acres) to a mere 1,650 square metres (17,800 sq ft) as a consequence of the Taiping Rebellion and to reduce the taxes owed by the mosque. The current structure was constructed in the late Qing Dynasty and its area has been reduced to 4,000 square metres (43,000 sq ft). In 2007, the mosque underwent reparation and renovation with the support of Nanjing municipal government. In 2014, the government added the adjacent primary school into the mosque area, thus doubling its area.

== Architecture ==
The Jinjue Mosque is elaborately styled in a Sino-Islamic architectural style. The three-entry gate has an imitation imperial tablet in the top center that reads "bestowed by imperial order" and below that it reads "Jingjuesi" (the name of the mosque). The mosque has several sahns, a reception room, a wudu, an antechamber, guest quarters, a prayer hall, a kitchen, and a mihrab located at the western end of the mosque.

== Transportation ==
The mosque is accessible within walking distance north east of Sanshanjie Station of Nanjing Metro.

== Gallery ==
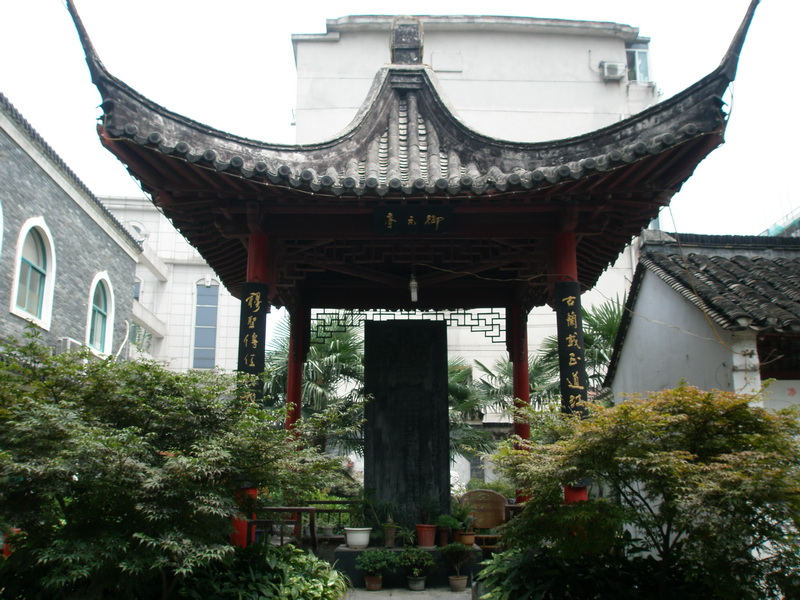
Unusual architectural style

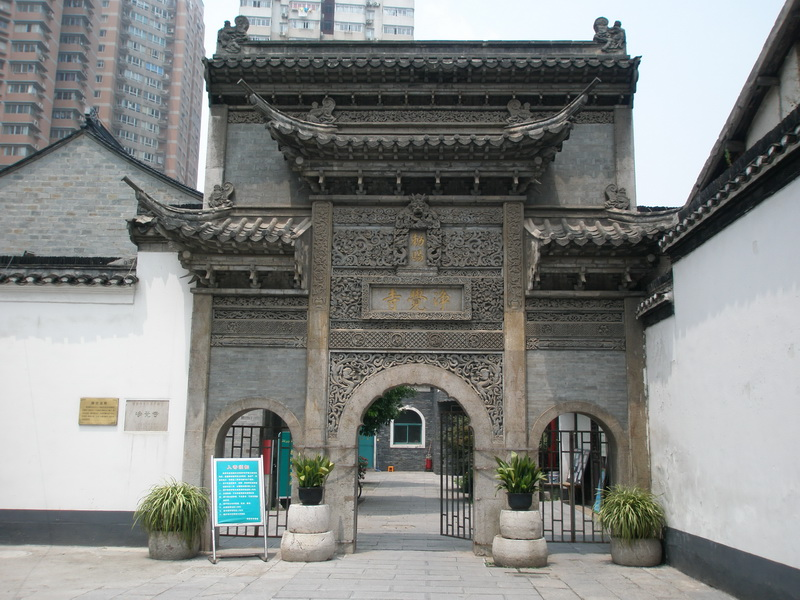
One of the three iwans

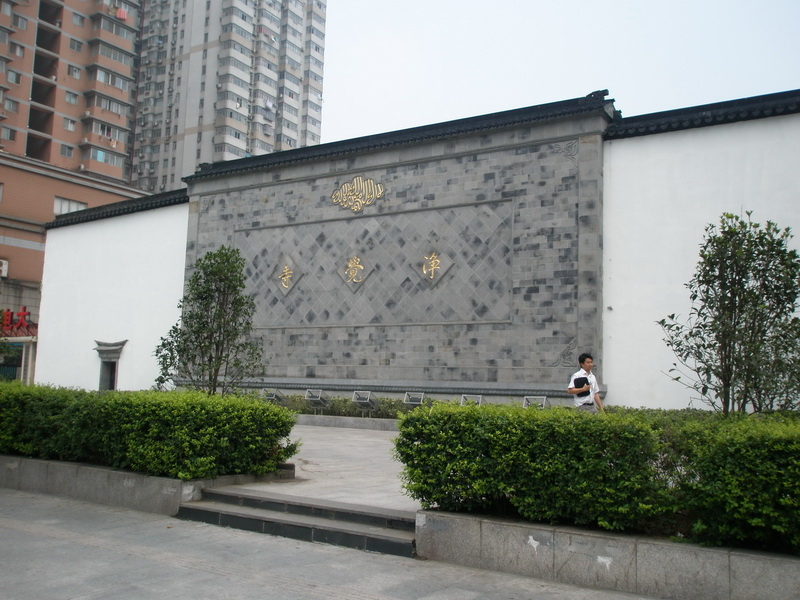
Modern eastern wall

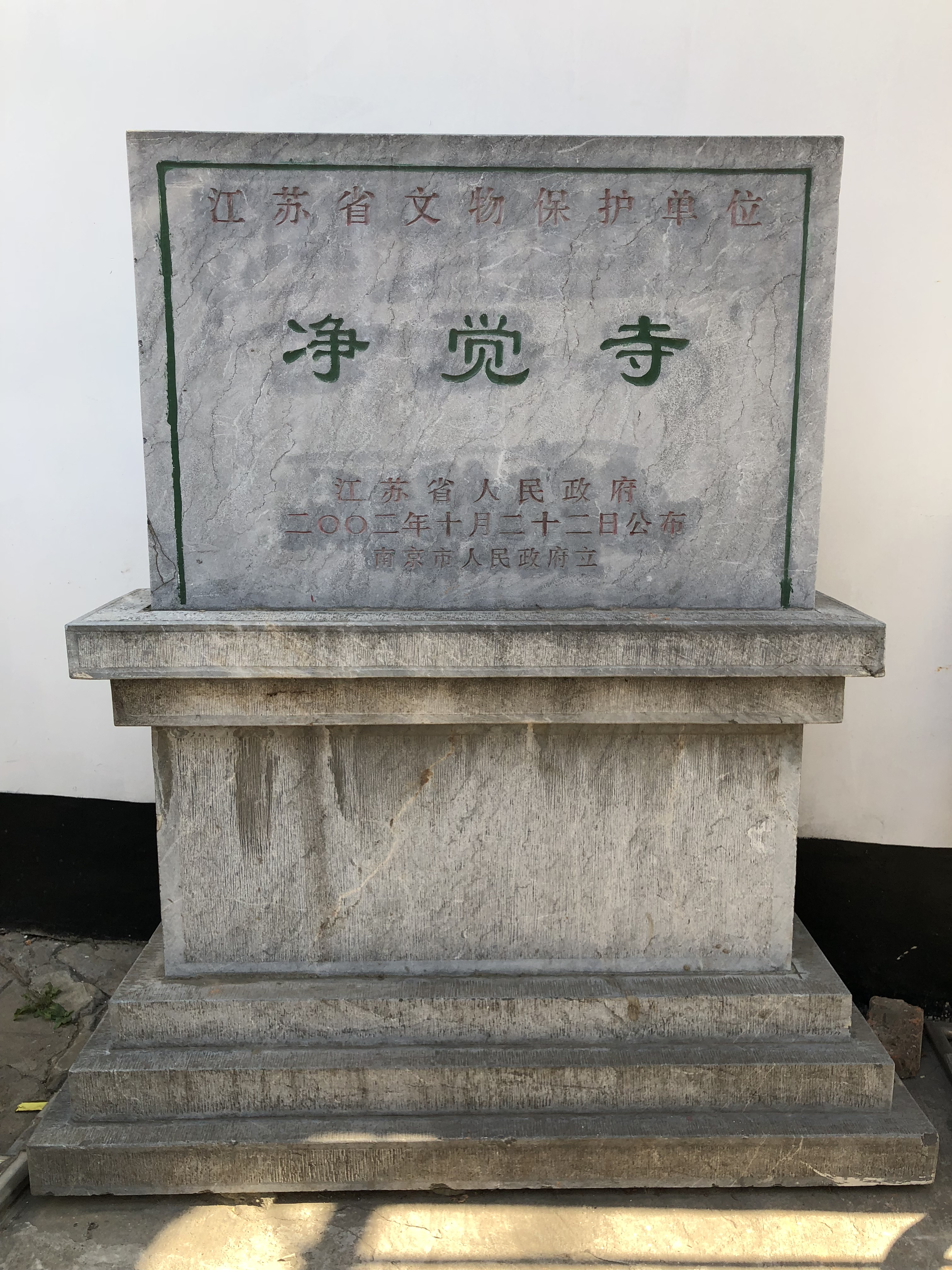
The tablet

== See also ==
- Islam in China
- List of mosques in China
