= Nanjing Economic and Technological Development Zone =

Nanjing Economic and Technological Development Zone 南京经济技术开发区
- Economic and Technological Development Zone
- Nickname: Nanjing ETDZ
- Country: China
- Province: Jiangsu
- Prefecture-level city: Nanjing
- District: Qixia District
- Established: September 18, 1992

Government
  - Party Secretary: Sun Haidong
  - Director: Lan Jun

Area
  - Total: 200 km^{2} (77 sq mi)

Population
  - Total: 300,000
- Time zone: UTC+8 (China Standard Time)
- Postal code: 210038
- Area code: 025

Nanjing Economic and Technological Development Zone (Nanjing ETDZ, Chinese: 南京经济技术开发区) is a state-level economic and technological development zone located in the western part of Qixia District, Nanjing, Jiangsu Province, China. It was established on September 18, 1992, and upgraded to a national-level development zone in March 2002 upon approval by the State Council of China. The zone covers an area of 200 km² and is divided into four main sub-zones: Xinguang, Qixia, Longtan, and LCD Valley.

== History ==
Nanjing ETDZ was initially approved as a provincial-level development zone in November 1993 by the Jiangsu provincial government. In 2002, it gained national-level status, and in 2003, the Nanjing Export Processing Zone was established within its boundaries. The zone has been ISO14001 certified and adopted streamlined administrative systems such as one-stop approval and service commitment mechanisms.

Over the past decades, the zone has developed rapidly with significant improvements in infrastructure and investment attraction. From 1995 to 2001, key economic indicators such as gross revenue, tax revenue, and export value increased annually by over 50%. For instance, total industrial output grew from ¥3 billion in 1996 to ¥20.5 billion in 2001.

By 2015, the zone’s industrial output reached ¥371.1 billion, with a GDP of ¥85.01 billion and foreign trade volume of US$21.65 billion. In 2019, the zone achieved a total industrial output of ¥300.3 billion, accounting for 98.5% of the district’s output. As of 2019, the zone housed 473 key enterprises, including 241 large-scale industrial firms, 95 in modern services, and 88 in wholesale and retail. Major industries include optoelectronic displays, integrated circuits, biomedicine, high-end equipment, modern logistics, and new energy vehicles.

In February 2021, the zone was designated one of the first China–Japan–South Korea (Jiangsu) Industrial Cooperation Demonstration Parks.

== Geographic Location ==
Nanjing ETDZ is situated in northeastern Nanjing, bordered by Jinxiuzhongshan in the south, the Second Yangtze River Bridge in the west, and Longtan Deep-water Port in the north. It enjoys strategic access to key infrastructure including:

- Ports: Longtan Port, Xinshengwei Port
- Railway: Xianlin railway station, Nanjing railway station, Nanjing South railway station
- Airport: Nanjing Lukou International Airport
- Highways and Urban Roads: Connected via expressways and city transport systems

== Special Platforms ==
The zone includes several national-level platforms such as:

- Nanjing Comprehensive Bonded Zone
- Xinguang High-tech Park
- Nanjing Port-based National Logistics Hub (Production and Service-oriented)

It also hosts key industrial clusters like China (Nanjing) Smart Valley and LCD Valley.

== Economy ==
By 2023, the zone’s total industrial output reached ¥345.56 billion. In 2019, it recorded a foreign trade volume of ¥84.23 billion (US$12.3 billion) and attracted US$690 million in foreign investment. Budgetary revenue totaled ¥10.15 billion, accounting for 68.5% of the district's total.
