= Chaotian Palace =

- 朝天宫 (Chinese); Cháotiān Gōng (Chinese)
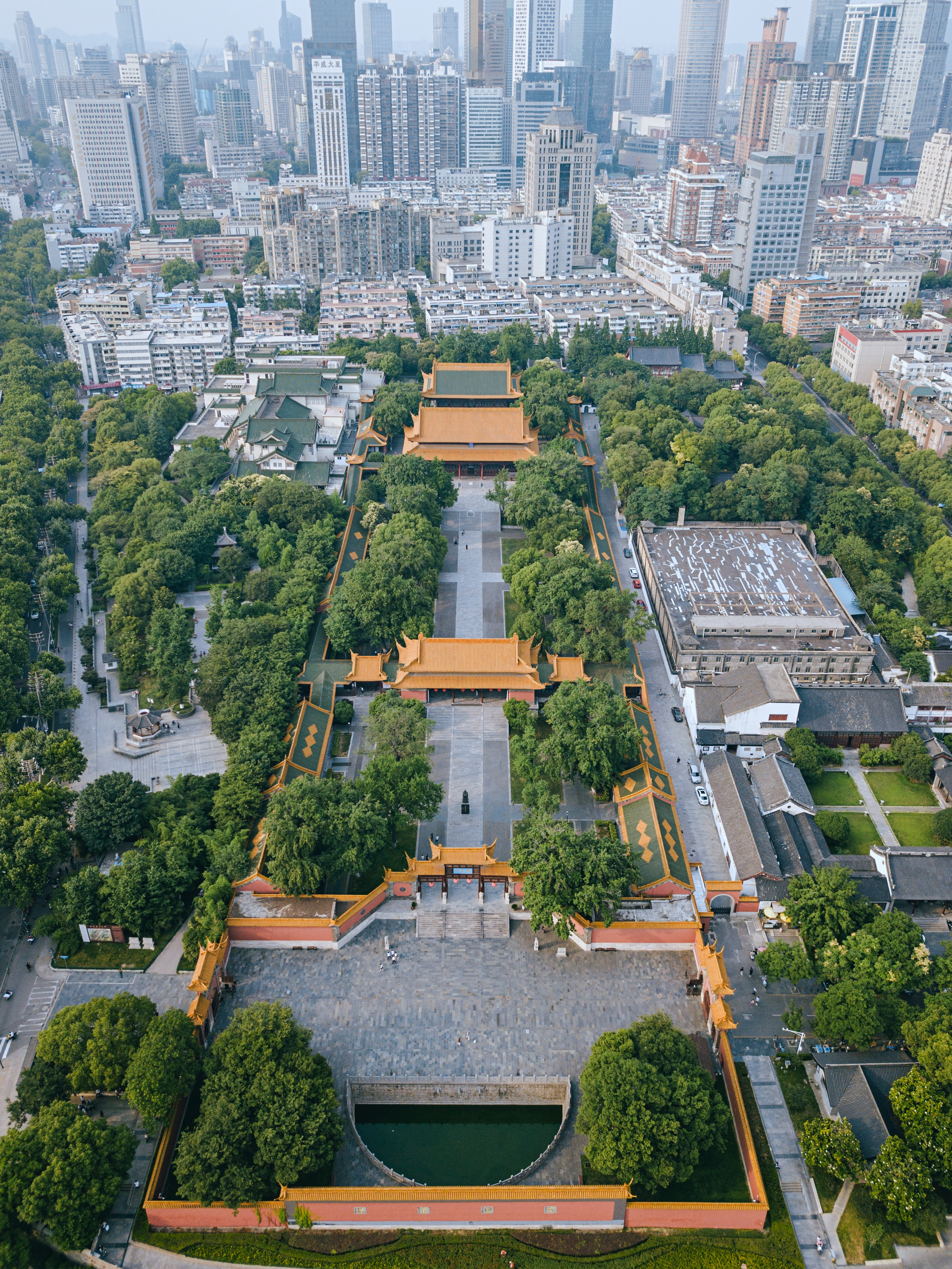
- the Chaotian Palace
- Interactive map of Chaotian Palace
- 32.035°N 118.775°E
- Location: Mochou Road, Nanjing, China

Site notes
- Architectural style: Ming dynasty

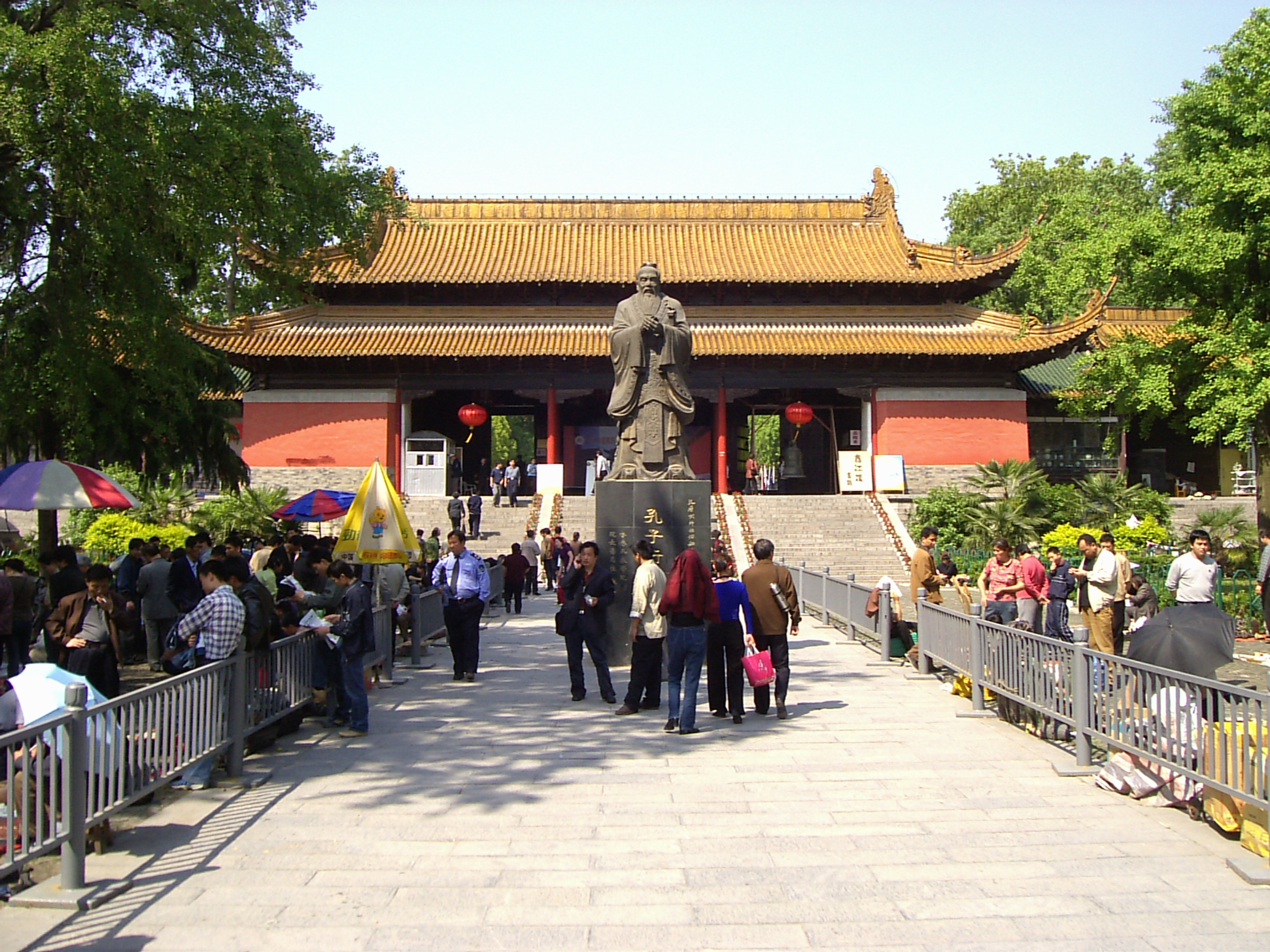

The Chaotian Palace (Chinese: 朝天宫; pinyin: Cháotiān Gōng, lit. "Palace of Heaven Veneration") is located in Nanjing, China. It was built as an imperial palace in the Ming dynasty, and today it is known as the Nanjing Municipal Museum. Chaotian Palace area has the largest preserved traditional Chinese architectural complex in Jiangnan.

== Overview ==
The palace is a complex of buildings, in the center of which is the Wen Temple, which was built with precious materials, including yellow glazed tile was from Jingdezhen in Jiangxi province. It is a total of 70,000 square meters, consisting of three lines.

Within the palace are more than 100,000 cultural relics.

== History ==
The site of the palace is located on Ye Mountain, once a place for metal casting in the ancient time of State of Wu in Zhou dynasty, named Ye Cheng, literally the city of metallurgy, the first name of the city of Nanjing. The Imperial Central University, at the time called Zongmingguan, was located there in Former Song dynasty. Chaotian Palace, or called Mingtian Palace, as a Taoist temple was originally named Ziji Palace built on the site of Zongmingguan in the era of Southern Wu, the Kingdom of Wu in the ending of Tang dynasty. It was rebuilt as Chaotian Palace by the Hongwu Emperor during the early Ming dynasty (in the late 14th century). In Ming dynasty it was used primarily by members of the royalty for "veneration of ancestors".

The complex was burnt down during the Taiping Rebellion in Qing dynasty, and the present buildings were built from 1866 to 1870 when Nanking Academy (Jiangning Fuxue) moved to the site. During the ROC rule the place became Examination Yuan, Capital High Court, Ministry of Education (once named Tahsueh Yuan), as well as Palace Museum Nanjing Branch. In the PRC it became the Nanjing Municipal Museum.

== Architectural design ==
Chaotian Palace is located in the west gate of Qinhuai District, Nanjing. It is the highest grade, the largest scale and the most complete preservation of ancient buildings in Jiangnan area. Emperor Zhu Yuanzhang of Ming Dynasty named Chaotian Palace, meaning "to worship heaven" and "to see the emperor", is the highest view of Ming Dynasty royal Taoism.

Chaotian Palace is a typical Ming and Qing dynasty palace style architecture, and its architectural pattern, style, and construction technology are important and rare physical materials for studying ancient Chinese architecture, especially Ming and Qing architecture. It has extremely high historical, artistic, and scientific value. In the Chaotian Palace, there is a Confucian Temple, to the east is the Fuxue Temple, and to the west is the Bianzhu Temple. In the south of the Confucian Temple is surrounded by the screen wall of "Ten Thousand Ren Palace Wall". In the palace wall is Panchi, and on the east and west sides are brick memorial archway. The front is Lingxing Gate. On both sides of the gate, there are Wenli Zhai and Si Shen Ku in the east, Wuguan Zhai and Si Ya Ting in the west. Across the Lingxing Gate to the north, there are Dacheng Gate, Dacheng Hall, Chongsheng Hall, and Jingyi Pavilion in turn. The east and west sides of Dacheng Hall have twelve verandas and corridors respectively. In the east of Jingyi Pavilion, there are Feiyun Pavilion, Feixia Pavilion, and Imperial Stele Pavilion.

== Exhibition Hall ==
Nanjing Museum is located in Chaotian Palace, covering an area of more than 50,000 square meters, exhibition hall area of more than 8000 square meters, collecting more than 100,000 cultural relics. These collections date back to the Republican period. It is rich in connotation and of high historical, artistic and scientific value.

=== Nanjing urban history exhibition ===
A total of more than 1,600 artifacts are on display in five parts, ranging from ancient times to the Qin and Han dynasties, Sui, Tang, Song and Yuan dynasties, Ming and Qing dynasties and the Republic of China.

=== Chaotian Palace history exhibition ===
It is divided into three units: "Yecheng Spring and Autumn", "Chaotian Yun Song" and "Human Story".

=== Fine collection exhibition ===
A collection of cultural relics, including items such as "Zhenguan treasure" Xiao Heyue chasing Han Xin earth plum bottles, and gold, silver and jade Ming Dynasty artifacts excavated from royal tombs. The interior design of the exhibition hall is typical of Jiangnan style. Depending on the material and characteristics of the relic, it will be displayed in groups of two to three people in about 10 theme spaces.

=== Collection of Song and Ming clothes exhibition ===
The exhibition hall, located in Nanjing Chongsheng Temple Museum, houses clothing from the Song and Ming Dynasties. Silk garments are beautifully and comfortably patterned, and various jewellery techniques are exquisite and dazzling. It shows the images, costumes and living habits of the ancients in Song and Ming Dynasties from the three dimensions of image, dress, decoration and living habits.

== Transportation ==
The palace is accessible within walking distance west of Zhangfuyuan station of Nanjing Metro Line 1. Chaotian Palace is located about 1000 meters southwest to Xinjiekou, the center of Nanjing, and about 800 meters east to Mochou Lake, hedged off by Qinhuai River and linked by Jianye Road Bridge.
