= Sanshanjie station =

Nanjing Metro station

Coordinates: 32°01′24″N 118°46′54″E

Sanshanjie 三山街
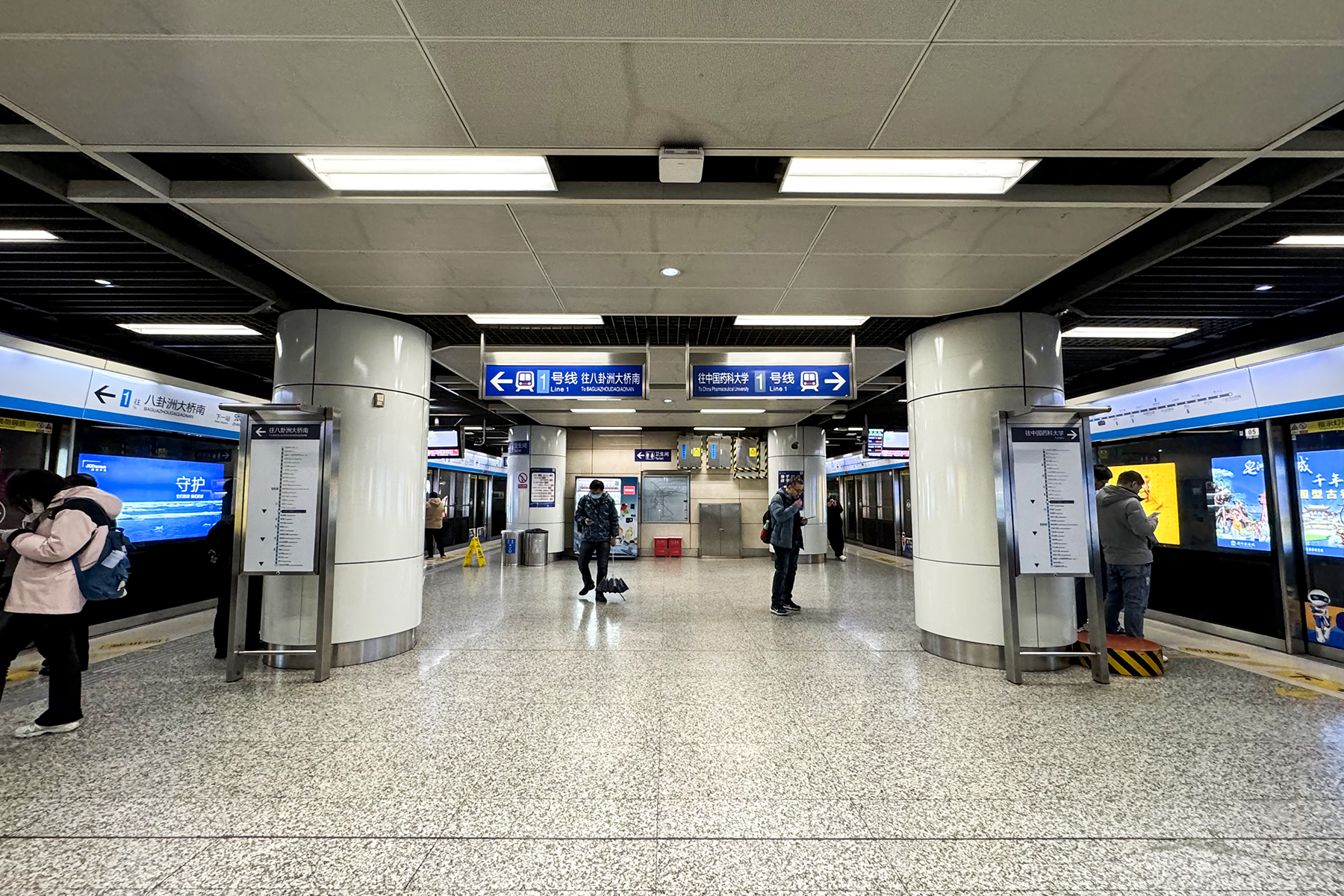
- Line 1 platform

General information
- Location: South Zhongshan Road; Qinhuai District, Nanjing, Jiangsu; China
- Operated by: Nanjing Metro Co. Ltd.
- Lines: Line 1; Line 5

Construction
- Structure type: Underground

Other information
- Station code: 118

History
- Opened: 3 September 2005 (Line 1); 6 August 2025 (Line 5)

Services
Preceding station	Nanjing Metro	Following station
Zhangfuyuan towards Baguazhoudaqiaonan	Line 1	Zhonghuamen towards CPU
Chaotiangong towards Fangjiaying	Line 5	Fuzimiao towards Jiyindadao
Location

Sanshanjie station (Chinese: 三山街站; pinyin: Sānshānjiē Zhàn) is a station of Line 1 of the Nanjing Metro, and a interchange station with the Line 5. Construction on the station began in 1992 in order for the Metro's engineers and designers to experiment and test their plans. Construction for the rest of Line 1 began eight years later in December 2000. It started operations on 3 September 2005 as part of the line's Phase I from Maigaoqiao to Andemen. (Note: The section from Andemen to Olympic Stadium that initially opened as Line 1 was re-designated as Line 10 when the latter opened in 2014.)

== Around the station ==
- Former Residence of Gan Xi
- Jiangnan Examination Hall
- Jinjue Mosque
- Nanjing Fuzimiao

== Gallery ==
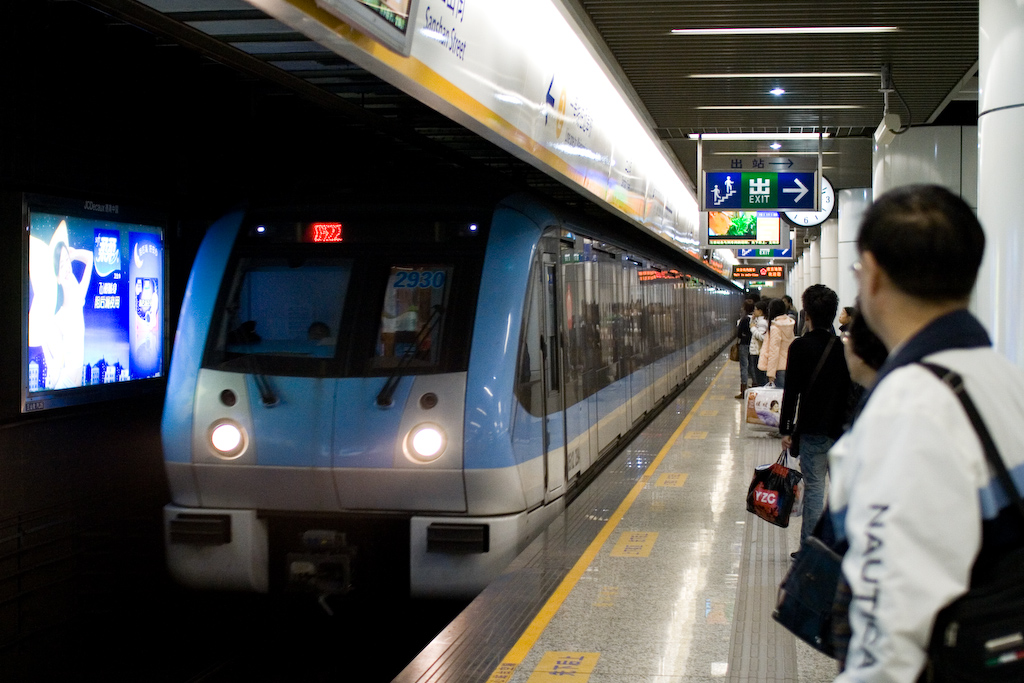
Train arriving at Sanshanjie station in 2007

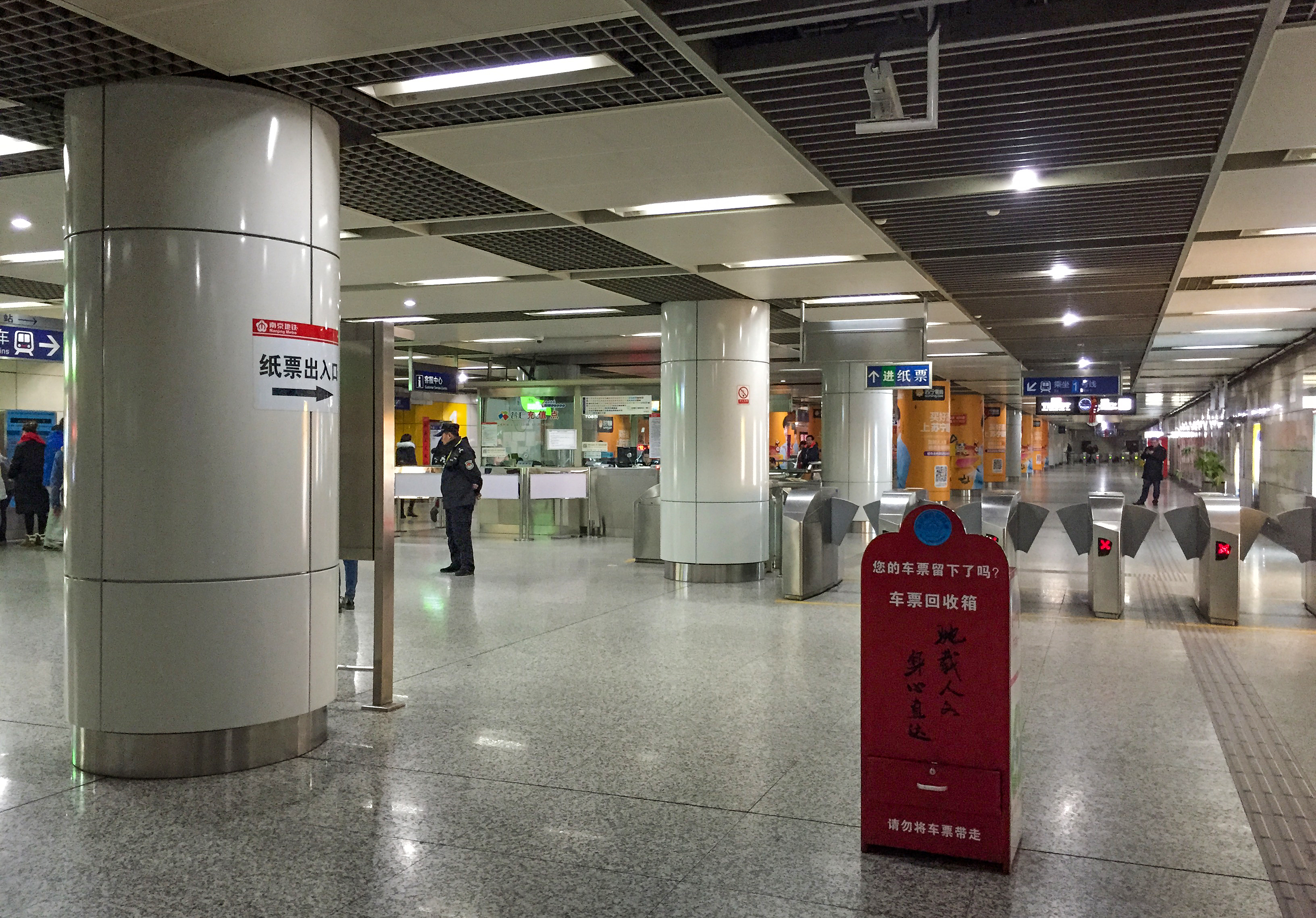
Line 1 concourse

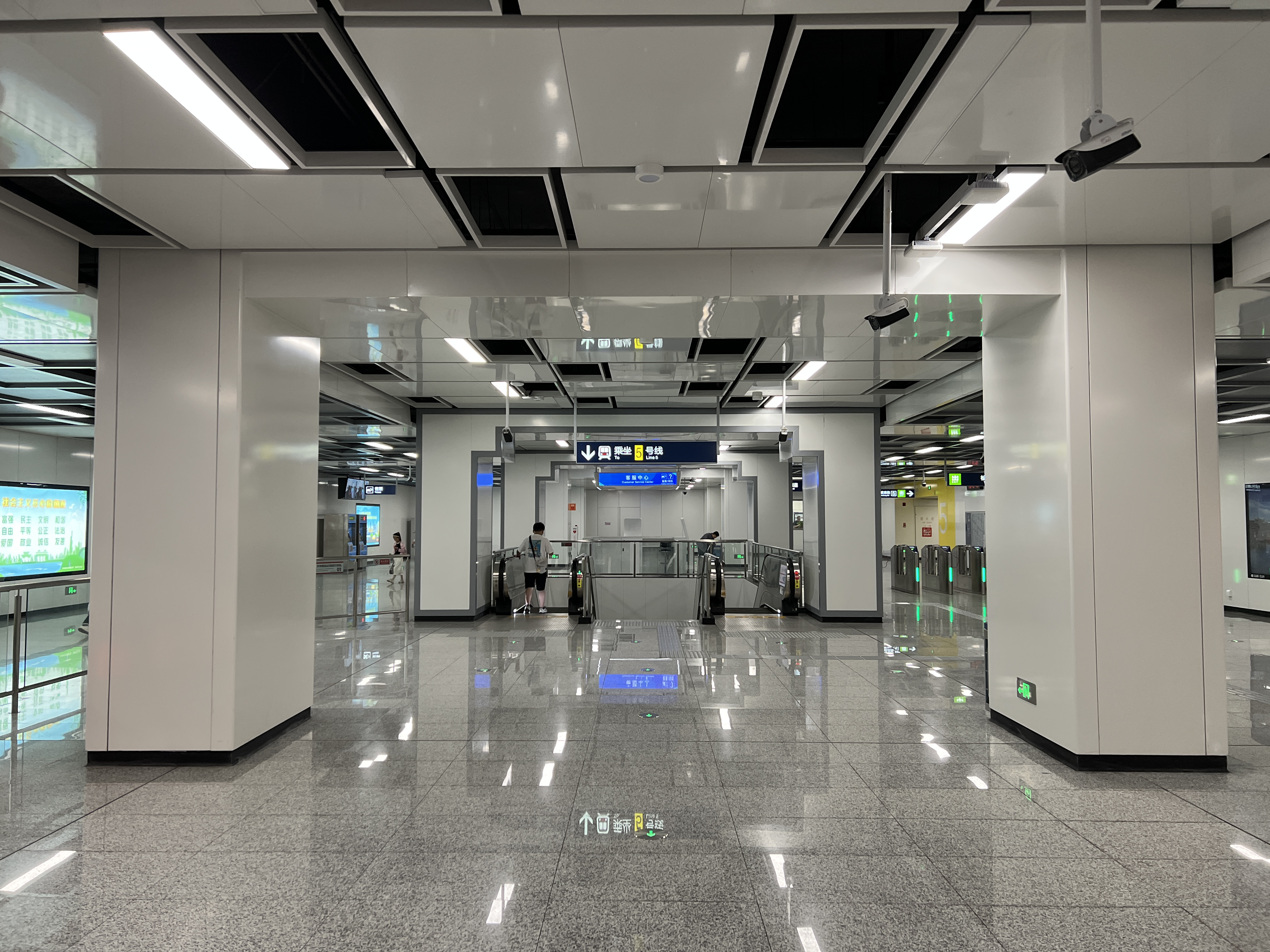
Line 5 concourse

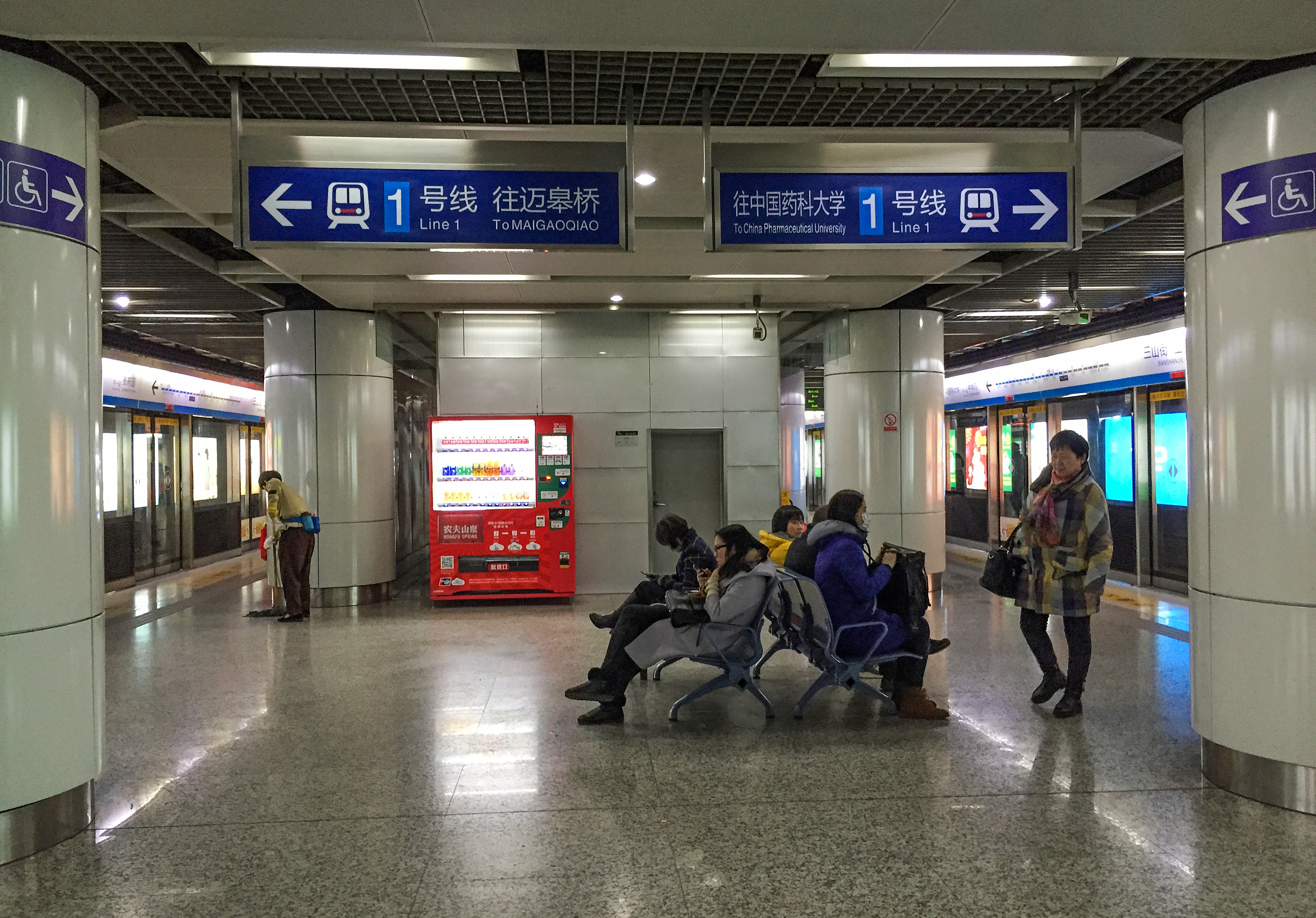
Line 1 platform

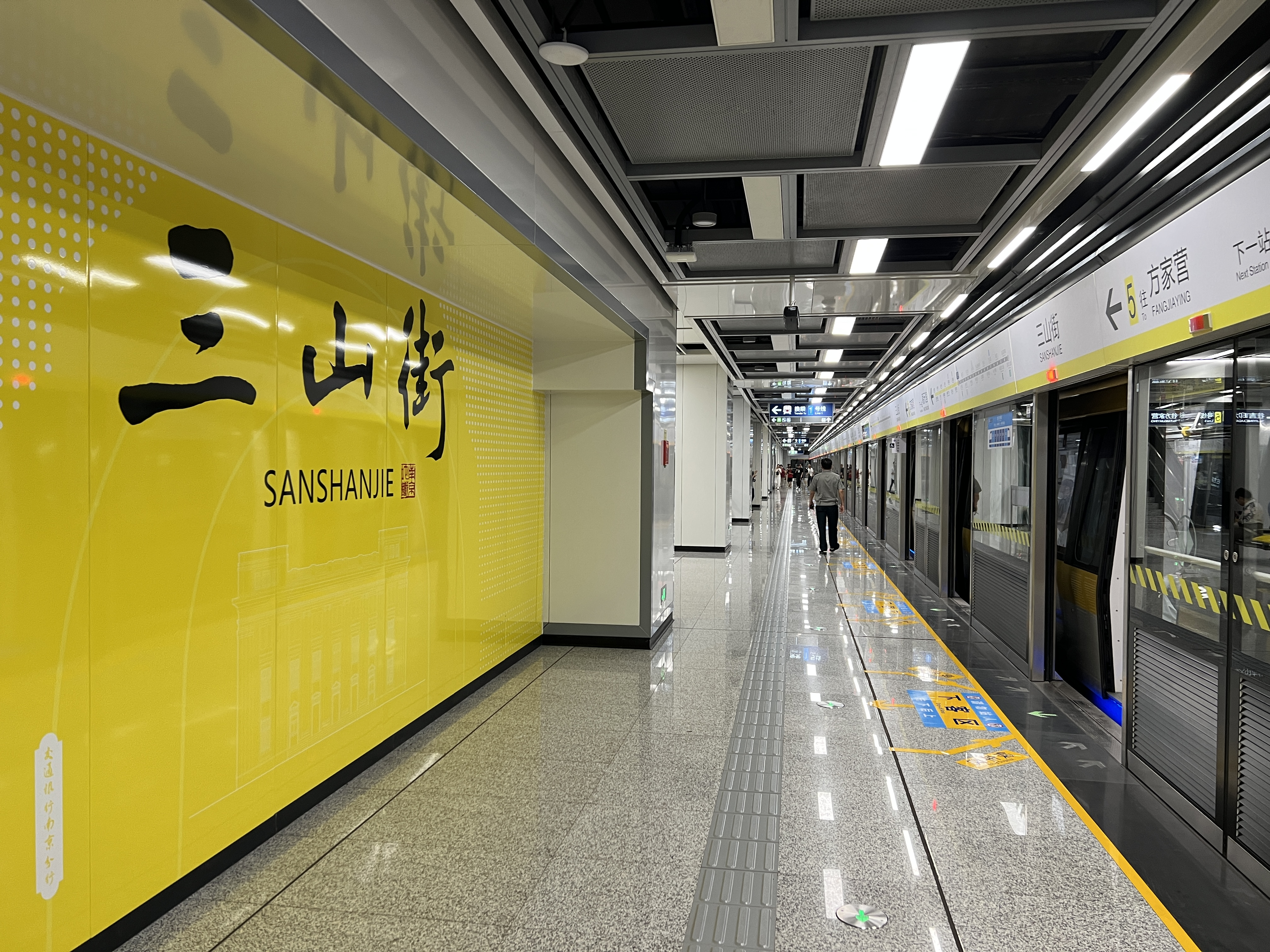
Line 5 platform
