= Yuhuamen station =

Nanjing Metro station

Yuhuamen 雨花门
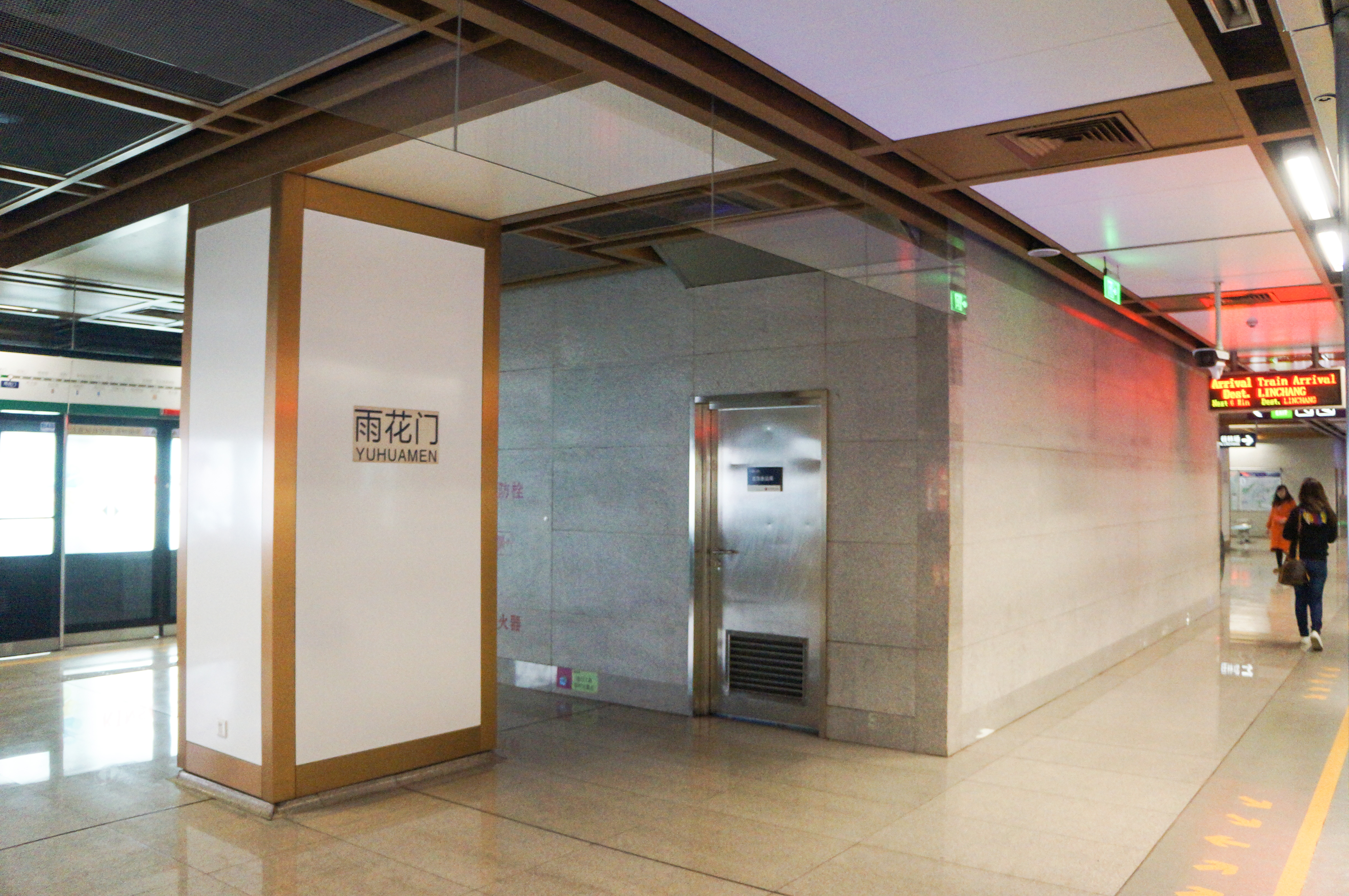

General information
- Location: Qinhuai District, Nanjing, Jiangsu; China
- Coordinates: 32.0058°N 118.7874°E
- Operated by: Nanjing Metro Co. Ltd.
- Line: Line 3

Construction
- Structure type: Underground

Other information
- Station code: 318

History
- Opened: 1 April 2015

Services
| Preceding station | Nanjing Metro | Following station |
|---|---|---|
| Wudingmen towards Linchang | Line 3 | Kazimen towards Moling |
Location

Yuhuamen station (Chinese: 雨花门站) is a station on Line 3 of the Nanjing Metro. It started operations on 1 April 2015.
