= Mount McGhan =

Mountain in Alaska, United States

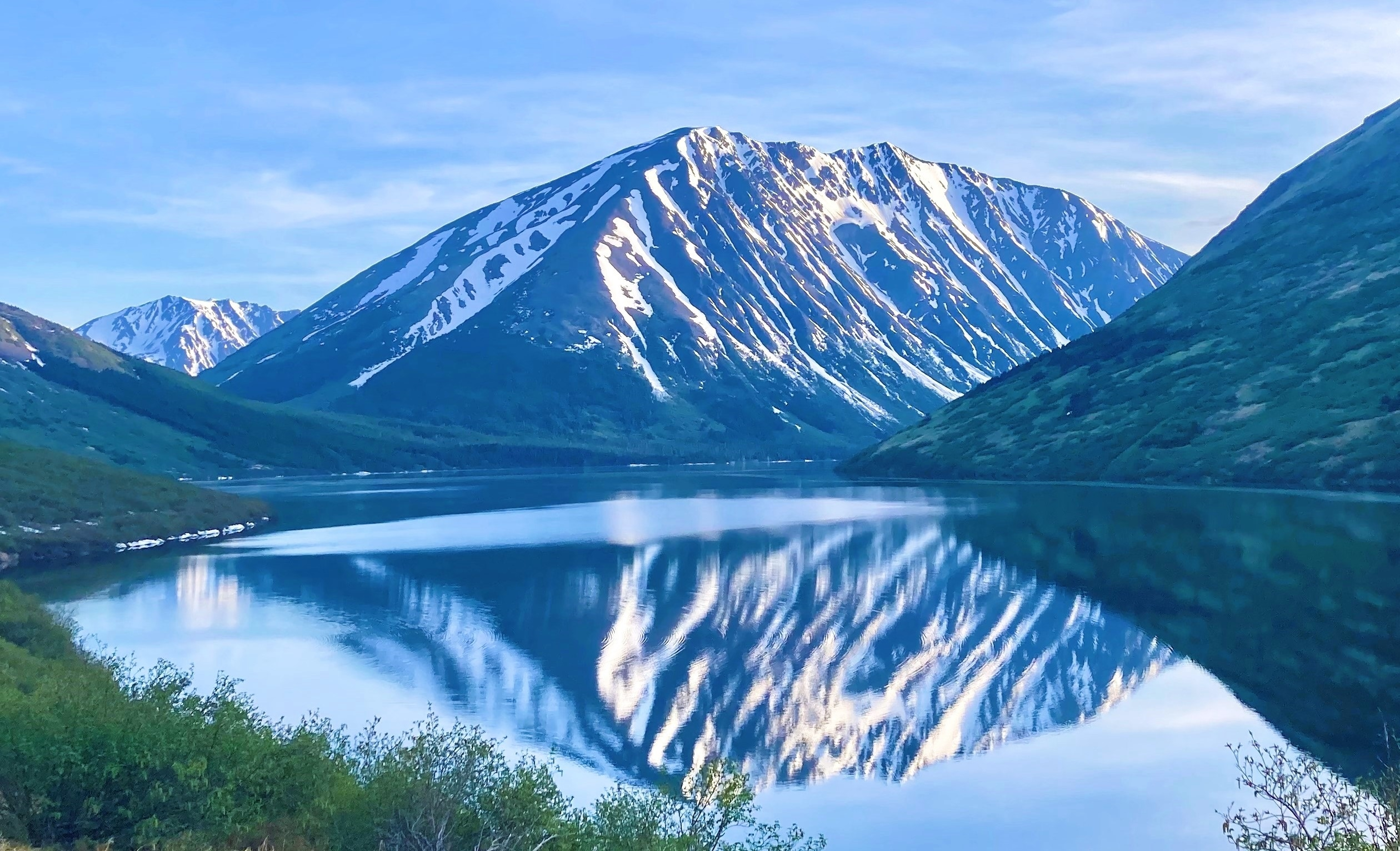
- Northeast aspect reflected in Crescent Lake

Highest point
- Elevation: 4,730 ft (1,442 m)
- Prominence: 2,110 ft (643 m)
- Parent peak: Axis Peak
- Isolation: 2.27 mi (3.65 km)
- Coordinates: 60°25′59″N 149°32′44″W

Naming
- Etymology: Bruce McGhan

Geography
- Location within Alaska
- Interactive map of Mount McGhan
- Country: United States
- State: Alaska
- Borough: Kenai Peninsula
- Protected area: Chugach National Forest
- Parent range: Kenai Mountains
- Topo map: USGS Seward B-7

Geology
- Rock age: Cretaceous
- Rock type: Metasedimentary rock

Mount McGhan is a 4,730-foot-elevation (1,442-meter) mountain summit in Alaska, United States.

== Description ==
Mount McGhan is located on the Kenai Peninsula on land managed by Chugach National Forest. It is set 23 miles (37 km) north of the city of Seward in the Kenai Mountains. Although modest in elevation, topographic relief is significant as the summit rises 3,275 feet (998 meters) above Crescent Lake in one mile (1.6 km), and 4,300 feet (1,311 meters) above Kenai Lake in two miles (3.2 km). Precipitation runoff from the mountain drains into these two lakes which are part of the Kenai River drainage basin. The mountain was named in 1988 after Bruce McGhan (1953–1986) at the request of his widow, Debra McGhan, with the Kenai Peninsula Borough Assembly supporting the proposal to honor her late husband who died in an industrial accident.

== Climate ==
Based on the Köppen climate classification, Mount McGhan is located in a subpolar oceanic climate zone with long, cold, snowy winters, and mild summers. Weather systems coming off the Gulf of Alaska are forced upwards by the Kenai Mountains (orographic lift), causing heavy precipitation in the form of rainfall and snowfall. Winter temperatures can drop below 0 °F with wind chill factors below −10 °F.

== Gallery ==
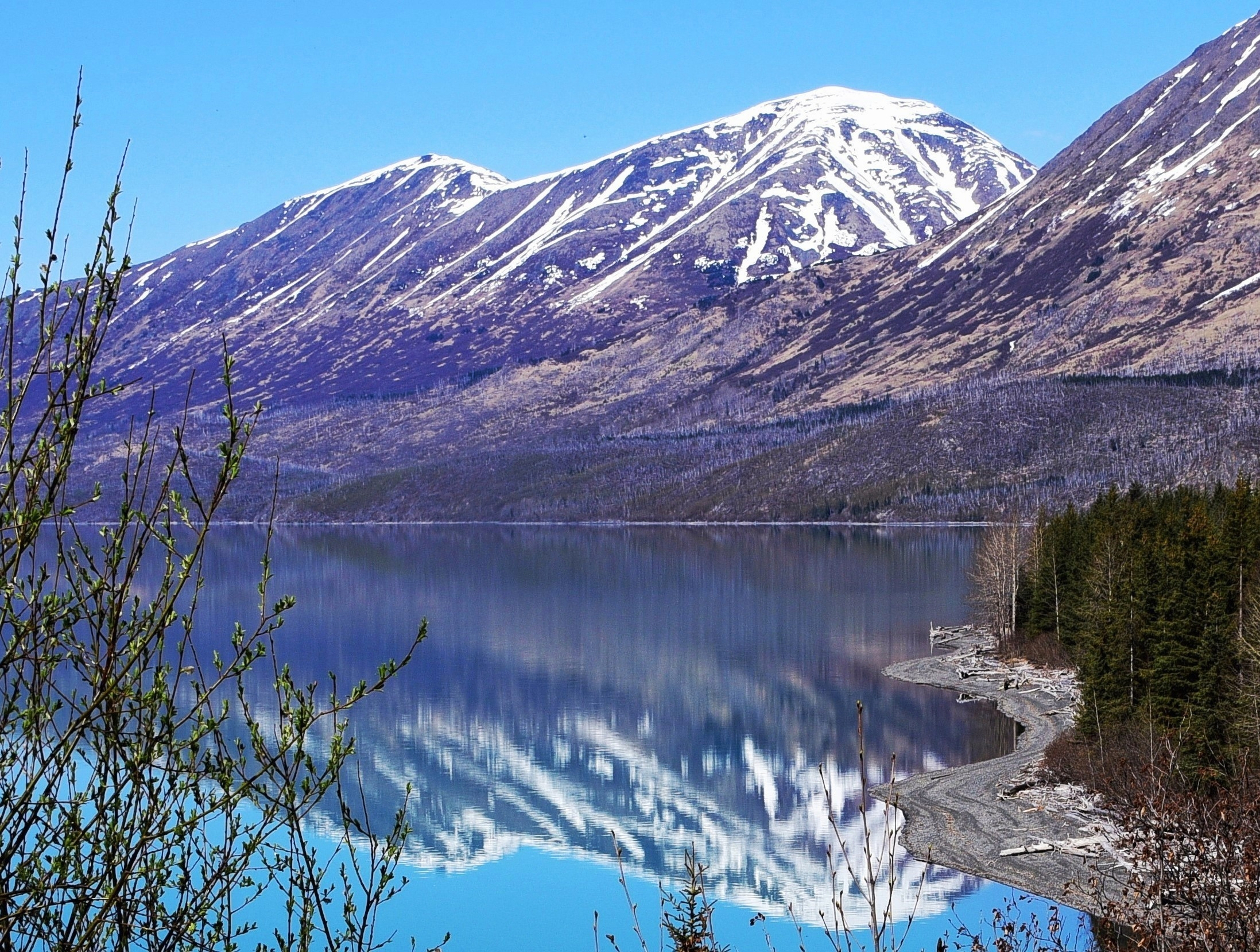
Southeast aspect of Mount McGhan across Kenai Lake

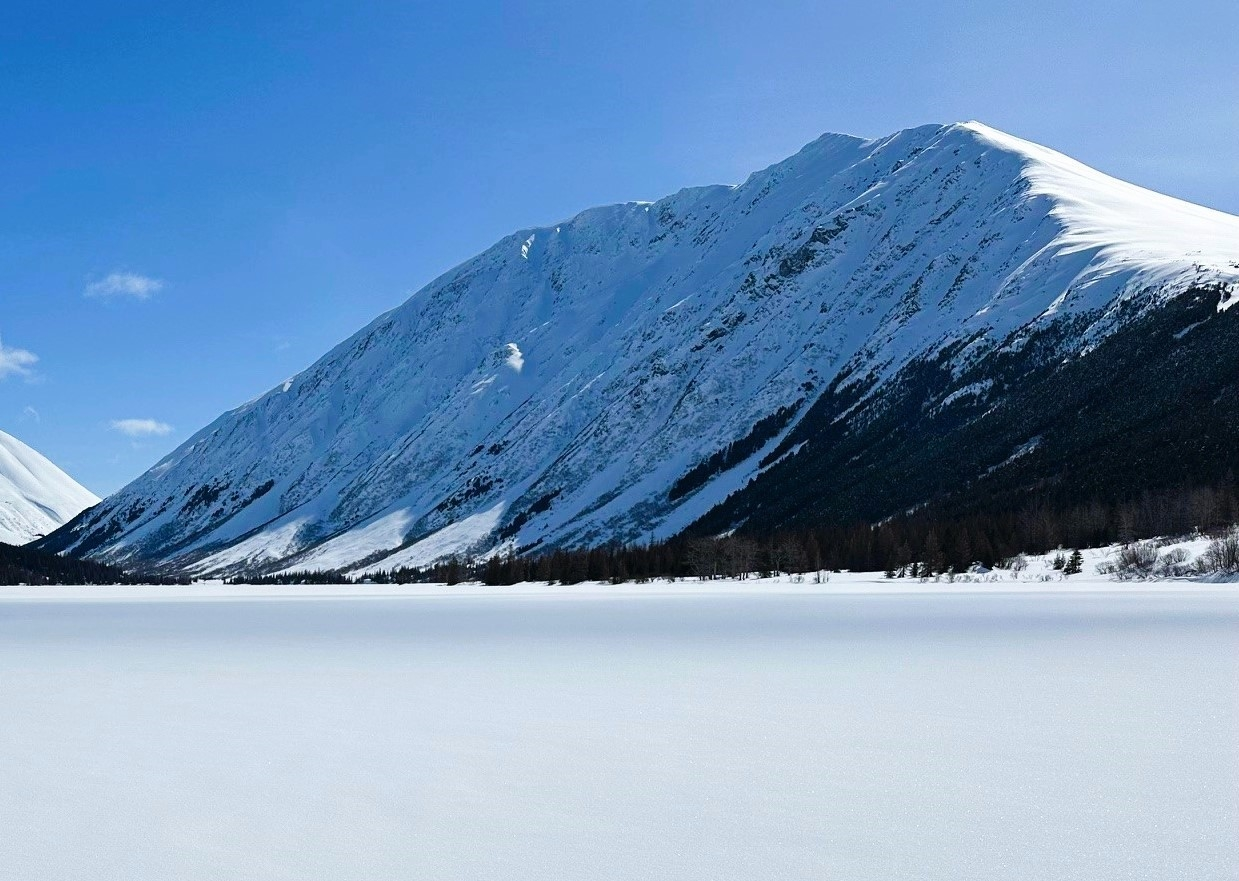
Northwest aspect from frozen Crescent Lake

== See also ==
- List of mountain peaks of Alaska
- Geology of Alaska
