= Kazimen station =

Nanjing Metro station

Kazimen 卡子门
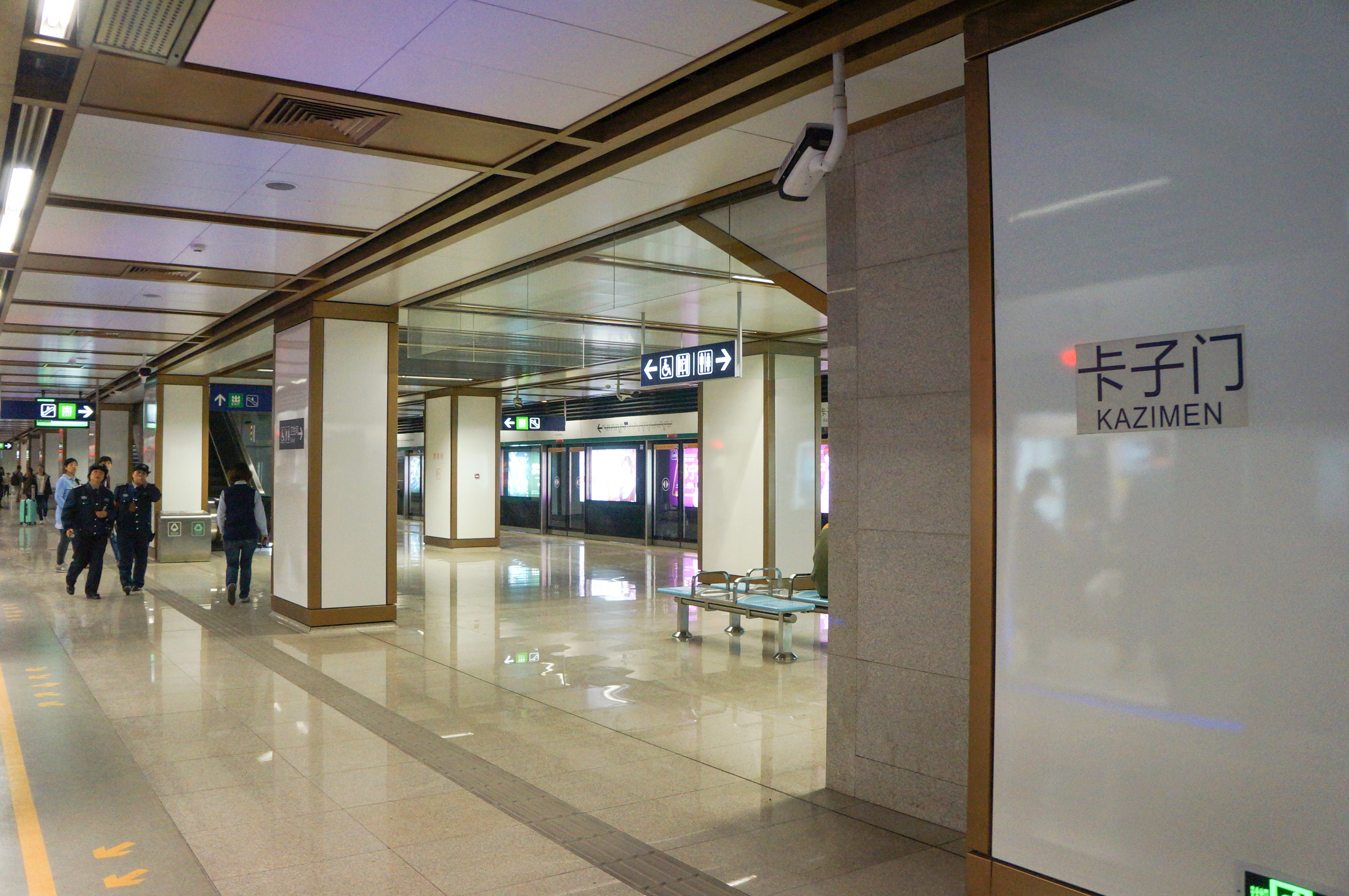

General information
- Location: Qinhuai District, Nanjing, Jiangsu; China
- Operated by: Nanjing Metro Co. Ltd.
- Lines: Line 3 Line 10

Construction
- Structure type: Underground

Other information
- Station code: 319

History
- Opened: 1 April 2015 (Line 3); 19 December 2025 (Line 10)

Services
Preceding station	Nanjing Metro	Following station
Yuhuamen towards Linchang	Line 3	Daminglu towards Moling
Jichangpaodaojiuzhi towards Dongqilu	Line 10	Yuhuatai towards Yushanlu
Location

Kazimen station (Chinese: 卡子门站) is a station on Line 3 and Line 10 of the Nanjing Metro. It started operations on 1 April 2015.
