= Zhangfuyuan station =

Nanjing Metro station

Coordinates: 32°01′50″N 118°47′02″E

Zhangfuyuan 张府园
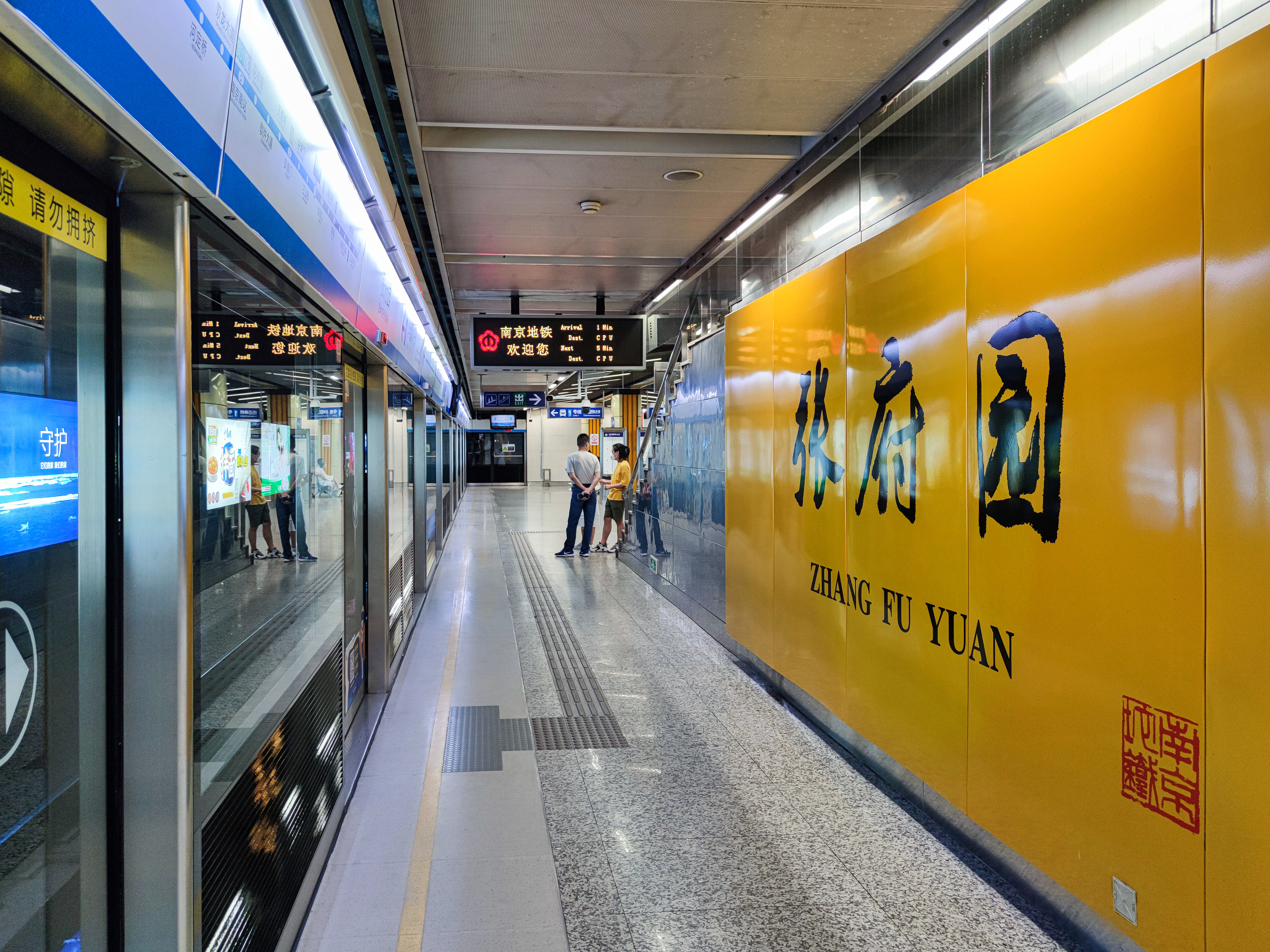

General information
- Location: South Zhongshan Road; Qinhuai District, Nanjing, Jiangsu; China
- Operated by: Nanjing Metro Co. Ltd.
- Line(s): Line 1

Construction
- Structure type: Underground

Other information
- Station code: 119

History
- Opened: 3 September 2005

Services
Preceding station	Nanjing Metro	Following station
Xinjiekou towards Baguazhoudaqiaonan	Line 1	Sanshanjie towards CPU

Zhangfuyuan station (simplified Chinese: 张府园站; traditional Chinese: 張府園站; pinyin: Zhāngfǔyuán Zhàn) is a station of Line 1 of the Nanjing Metro. It started operations on 3 September 2005 as part of the line's Phase I from Maigaoqiao to Andemen. (Note: The section from Andemen to Olympic Stadium that initially opened as Line 1 was re-designated as Line 10 when the latter opened in 2014.)

== Around the station ==
- Caoqiao Mosque
- Chaotian Palace
