= Jiangnan Examination Hall =

Building in Nanjing, China

- 江南贡院
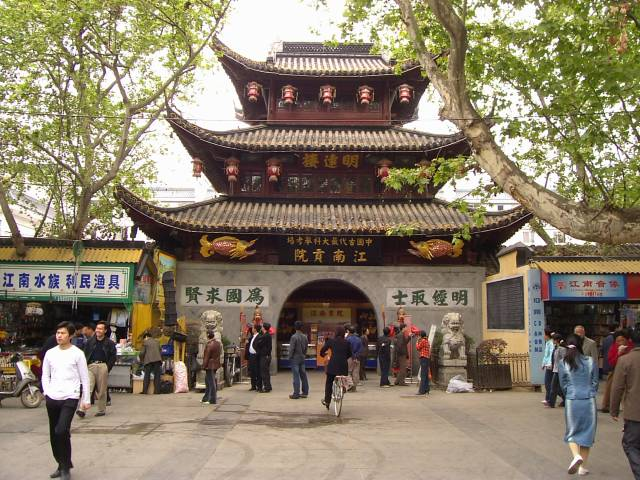

- Location within China
- Alternative names: Jiangnan Gongyuan

General information
- Status: Completed
- Location: 122 Fuzimiao St, Qinhuai District, Nanjing, China
- Coordinates: 32°1′18.83″N 118°47′25.37″E
- Completed: 1168

Technical details
- Floor area: 300,000 m2

The Jiangnan Examination Hall (simplified Chinese: 江南贡院; traditional Chinese: 江南貢院; pinyin: Jiāngnán Gòngyuàn, Jiangnan Gongyuan), near the Confucius temple, is located in the southern part of Nanjing, Jiangsu Province, China. It is the largest examination hall for imperial examination in ancient China. It now houses the Imperial Examination Museum.

== History ==
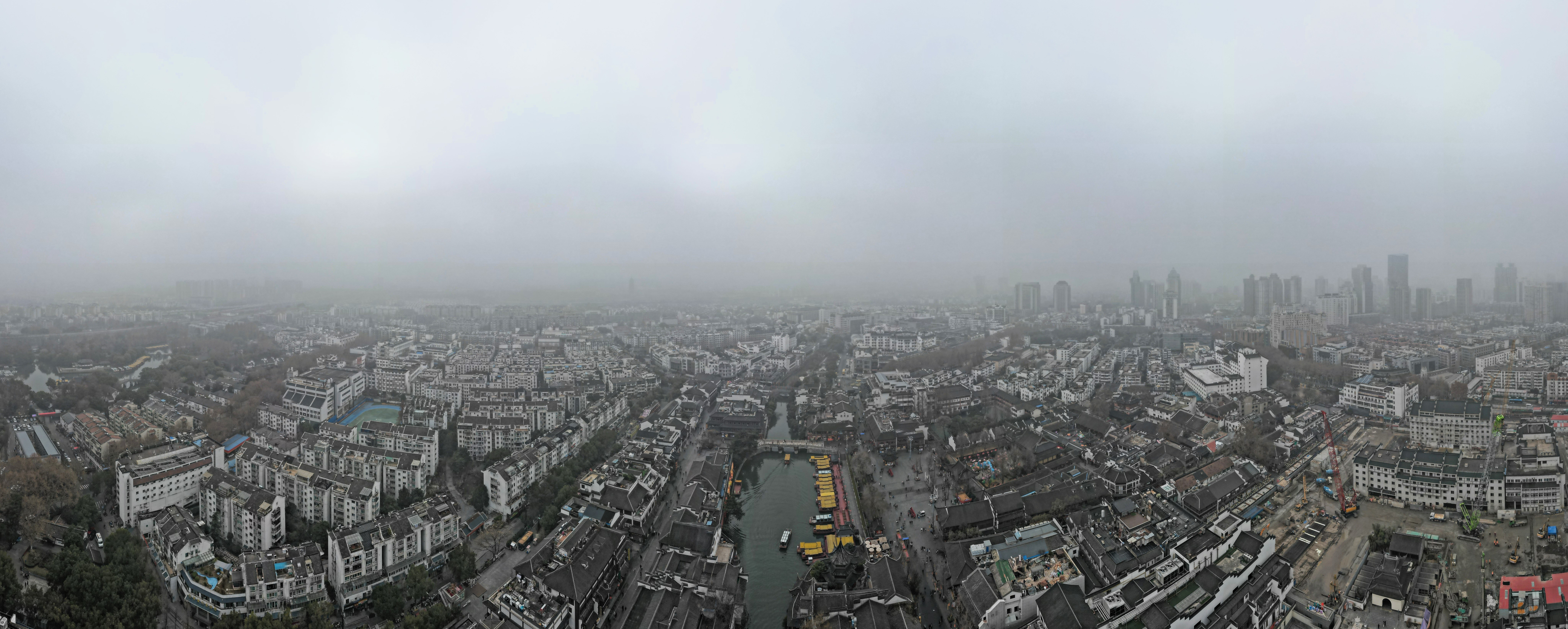
Aerial panorama of Nanjing South and the Qinhuai River where the Jiangnan Examination Hall is located. December 2023.

The Jiangnan Examination Hall (Jiangnan Gongyuan) was first built in the 4th year of Emperor Xiaozong's reign (Qiandao era) of the Southern Song (1168). Nanjing was made capital in the Ming dynasty. The Jiangnan Examination Hall was used as the examination hall for both the provincial level examination (juren) of Jiangsu Province as well as Anhui Province and metropolitan examination (jinshi). After the capital was moved to Beijing in the Yongle period, the formal capital became Nanjing Had. Jiangnan Examination Hall was heavily expanded with 20,644 examination cells. In the early Qing dynasty (1873), Nanjing was the capital of Jiangnan province, so the Examination Hall continued to use the name of Jiangnan Examination Hall.

== Examination ==
During the Qing dynasty, the imperial examination included 112 subjects. There were a total of 58 examinees from the Jiangnan Province (which includes Jiangsu, Anhui, Shanghai today) who passed the provincial imperial examination held in the Jiangnan Examination Hall. They then became a Number One Scholar in the final imperial examination. These 58 examinees, 49 from Jiangsu and 9 from Anhui, consisted of c.52% of the Number One Scholars at national level.

Within the Examination Hall, there were two enclosures surrounded by walls full of thorns. These were designed to avoid cheating and were known as the "Thorns Wall".

== Location and size ==
East from Yao's Lane, west to Gongyuan West Street, north near Qinhuai River and south to Jiankang Road, the Examination Hall used to cover an area of 300,000 m^{2}. It is one of the main architectural complexes in the Confucius Temple District. T'ai-tsu also built a government-run brothel by the side of Qinhuai River, which faced the Examination Hall across the river. The brothel was once called the Old Court or Fule Court, which was built for use by scholars. The district of Qinhuai River once prospered because of the Examination Hall, Fule Court, and Confucius Temple. Only a Siheyuan-type building is left now, which is used as a museum.

The Examination Hall was listed among the third batch of Provincial Key Cultural Relics Protection Units in Jiangsu Province in 1982. In 2002, the ancient buildings of Jiangnan Examination Hall were classified into Gongyuan Inscriptions, and it was listed in the provincial units of cultural relics protection under the name of Jiangnan Examination Hall.

== Famous people ==
Famous people in the Ming dynasty and Qing dynasty such as Tang Bohu, Zheng Banqiao, Wu Jingzi, Shi Nai'an, Weng Tonghe, Li Hungchang and "Number One Scholar" Zhang Jiang in the late Qing dynasty all took the imperial examination here.

== Imperial Examination Museum ==
The Nanjing Imperial Examination Museum of China (Chinese: 南京中国科举博物馆) in Jiangnan Examination Hall, is located in the 1st Jinlin Road, Confucius Temple, Nanjing. It is the only professional museum that reflects the content of Chinese imperial civil examination system in China. The museum, open both day and night, is also a place for studying the imperial examination and an institution for collecting cultural relics and historical data about the imperial examination.

== Transportation ==
The building is accessible within walking distance east of Sanshanjie Station of Nanjing Metro Line 1 and Fuzimiao Station of Line 3 and 5. Alternative buses including route 1, 4, 7, 44, 202, and Y1 at Jiankang Road - Fuzimiao bus stop.
