= Xuanjin Bridge =

Xuanjin Bridge 玄津桥
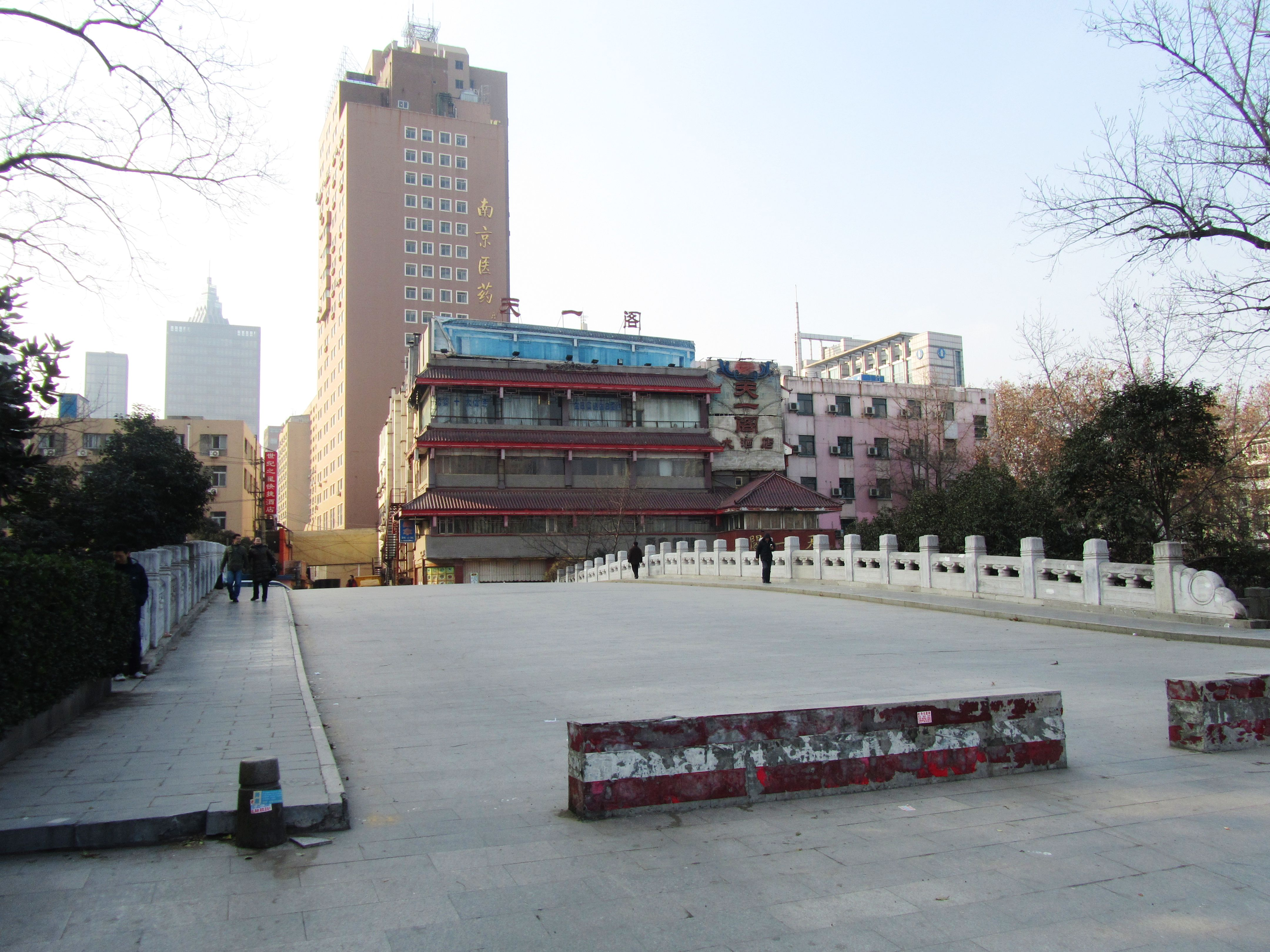
- Xuanjin Bridge in January 2012
- Coordinates: 32°02′45″N 118°48′38″E
- Carries: Pedestrians and bicycles
- Crosses: Moat of the Ming Palace
- Locale: Qinhuai District, Nanjing, Jiangsu, China

Characteristics
- Design: Arch bridge
- Material: Stone
- Total length: 41.6 metres (136 ft)
- Width: 19.1 metres (63 ft)

History
- Construction end: 1368–1398

The Xuanjin Bridge (simplified Chinese: 玄津桥; traditional Chinese: 玄津橋; pinyin: Xuánjīn Qiáo) is a historic stone arch bridge over the moat of the Ming Palace in Qinhuai District, Nanjing, Jiangsu, China.

== History ==
Xuanjin Bridge was originally built between 1368 and 1398 during the Hongwu Emperor's reign of the Ming dynasty (1368–1644). The bridge is 41.6 metres (136 ft) long and 19.1 metres (63 ft) wide with three arches. In the Kangxi era of the Qing dynasty (1644–1911), due to the naming taboo of "Xuan" (Kangxi Emperor's bornname "Xuanye"), its name was changed to "Yuanjin Bridge" (元津桥).

In December 2011, it was classified as a provincial cultural relic preservation organ by the Government of Jiangsu.

== Gallery ==
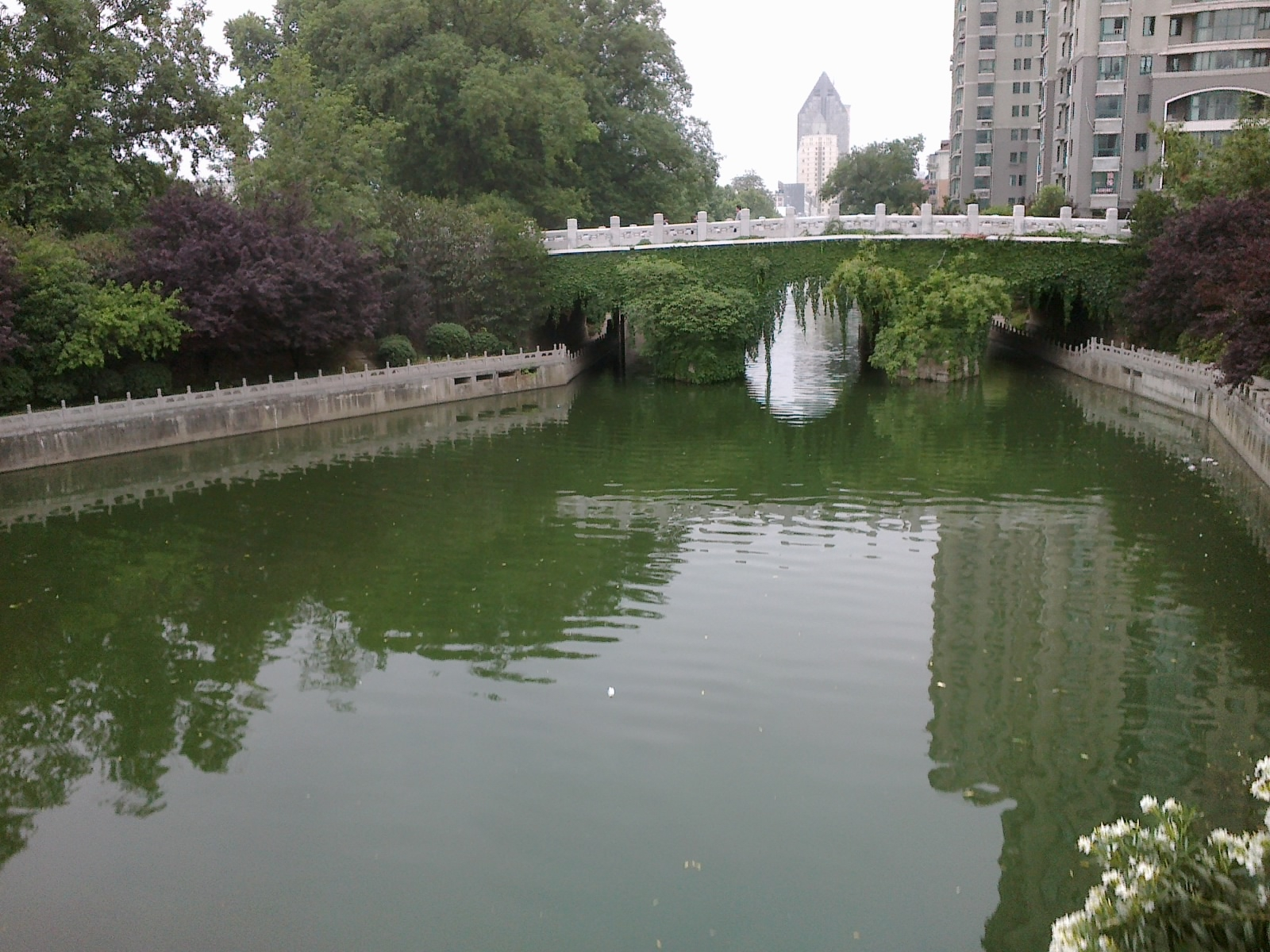
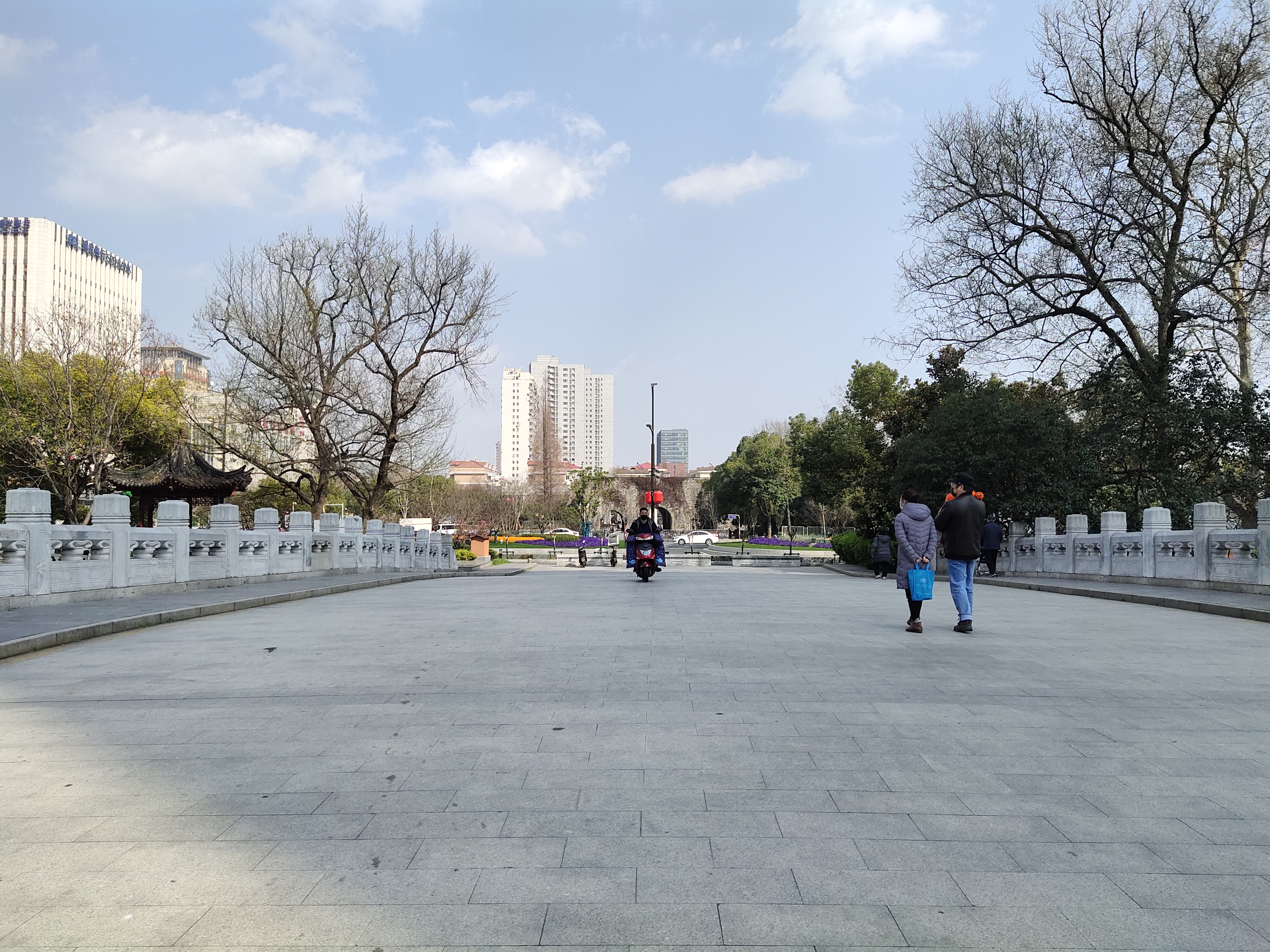
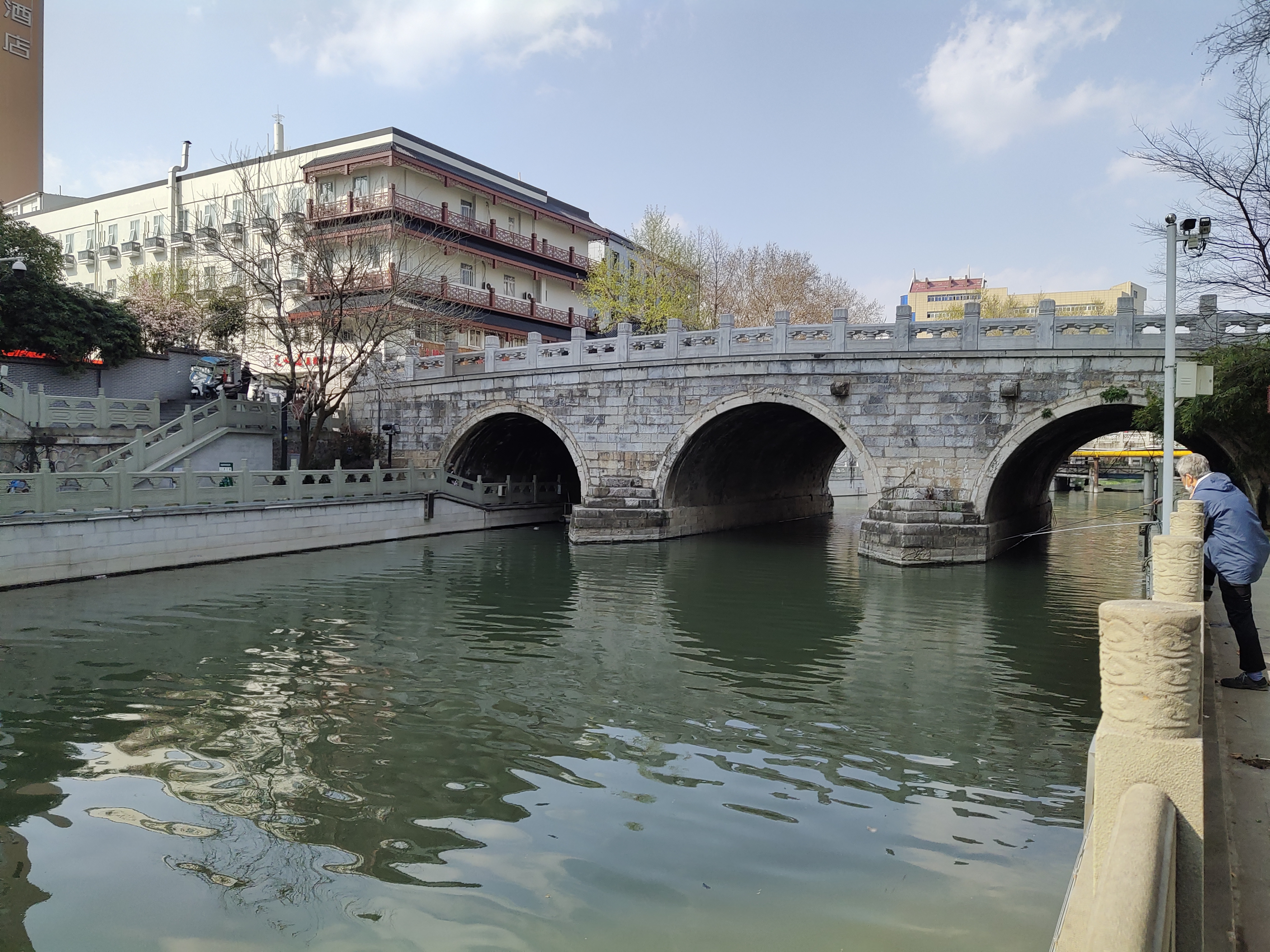
