= Caoqiao Mosque =

Mosque in Nanjing, Jiangsu, China

- 草桥清真寺
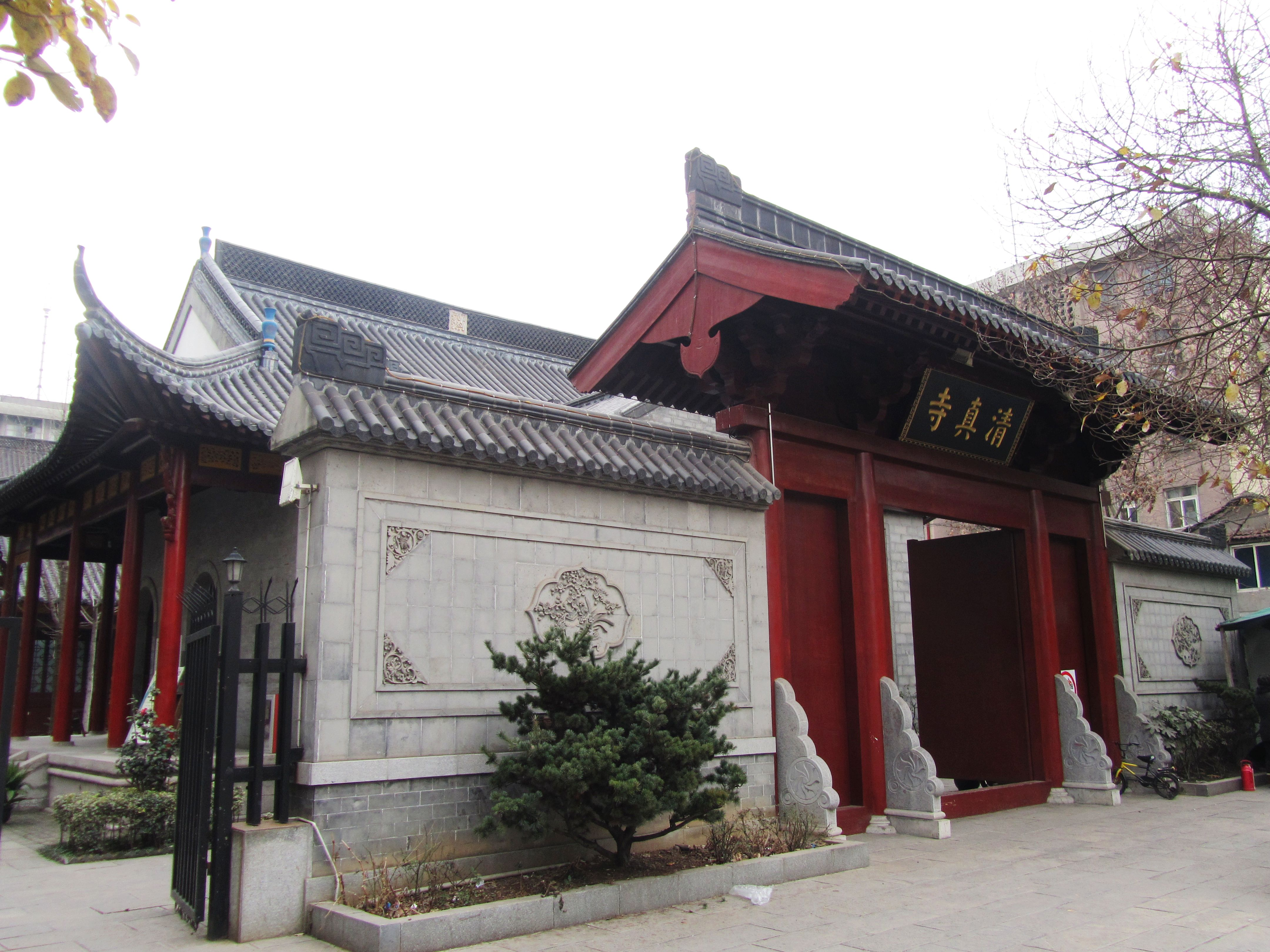

- Location of the mosques in Jiangsu

Religion
- Affiliation: Sunni Islam
- Ecclesiastical or organizational status: Mosque
- Status: Active

Location
- Location: 26-32 Ganyu Lane, Qinhuai, Nanjing, Jiangsu
- Country: China
- Interactive map of Caoqiao Mosque
- Coordinates: 32°01′46″N 118°46′41″E

Architecture
- Type: Mosque
- Style: Chinese
- Completed: c. 1796
- Minaret: 1

The Caoqiao Mosque (simplified Chinese: 草桥清真寺; traditional Chinese: 草橋清真寺; pinyin: Cǎoqiáo Qīngzhēnsì), also known as the Grass Bridge Mosque, is a mosque in the Qinhuai District of Nanjing City, in the Jiangsu province of China.

== Overview ==
The mosque was constructed during the Qianlong Emperor (r. 1735–1796) rule of the Qing dynasty. Since then, the mosque has been reconstructed and removed several times.

The mosque was built in the traditional Chinese architectural style. It consists of main prayer hall, teaching room, wudu, and wing room.

The mosque houses the headquarters of Chinese Hui Religion Association (Chinese: 中国回教联合会), established in 1912.

== Transportation ==
The mosque is accessible within walking distance west of Zhangfuyuan Station of Nanjing Metro.

== Gallery ==
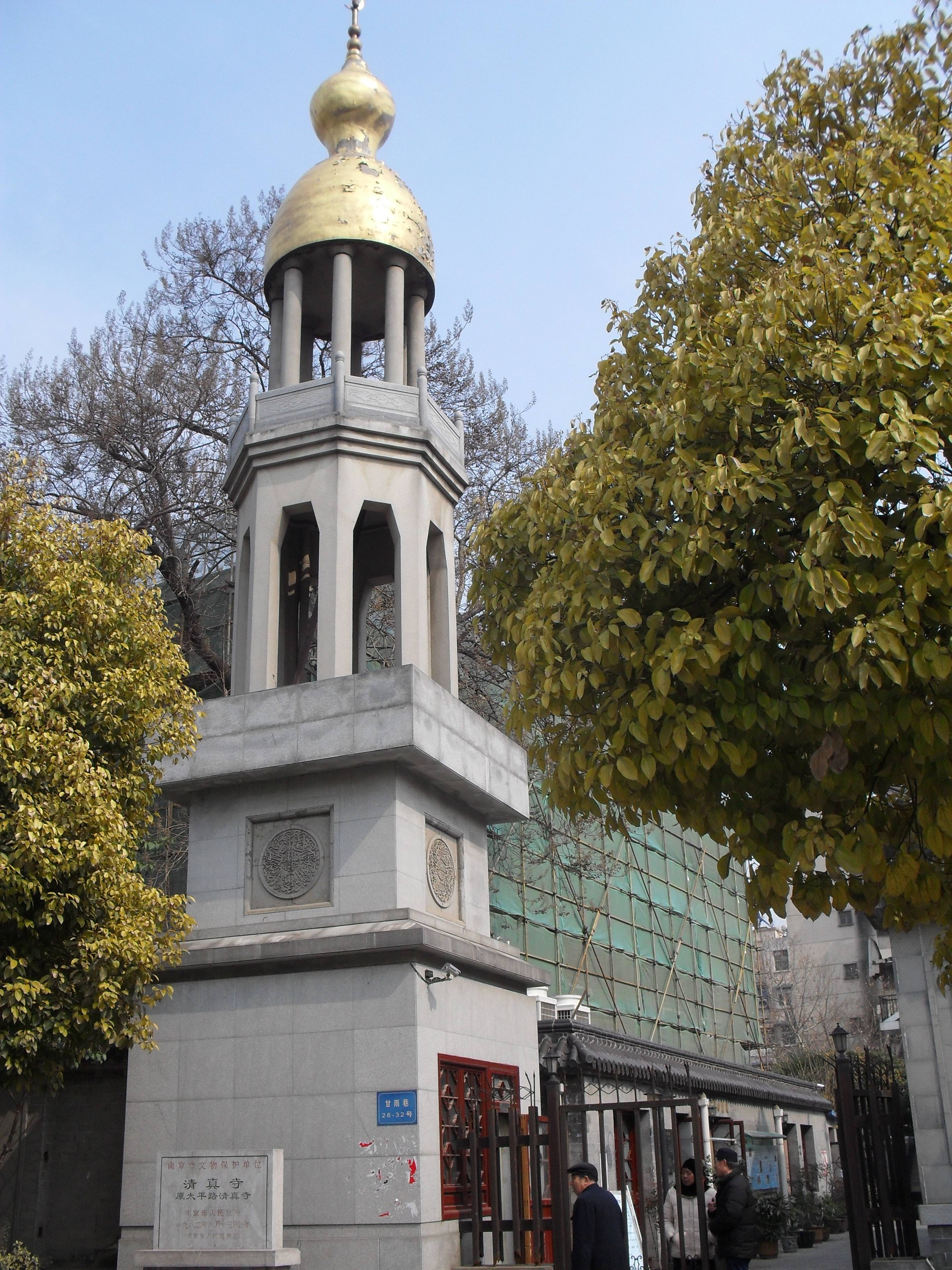
The unusual minaret

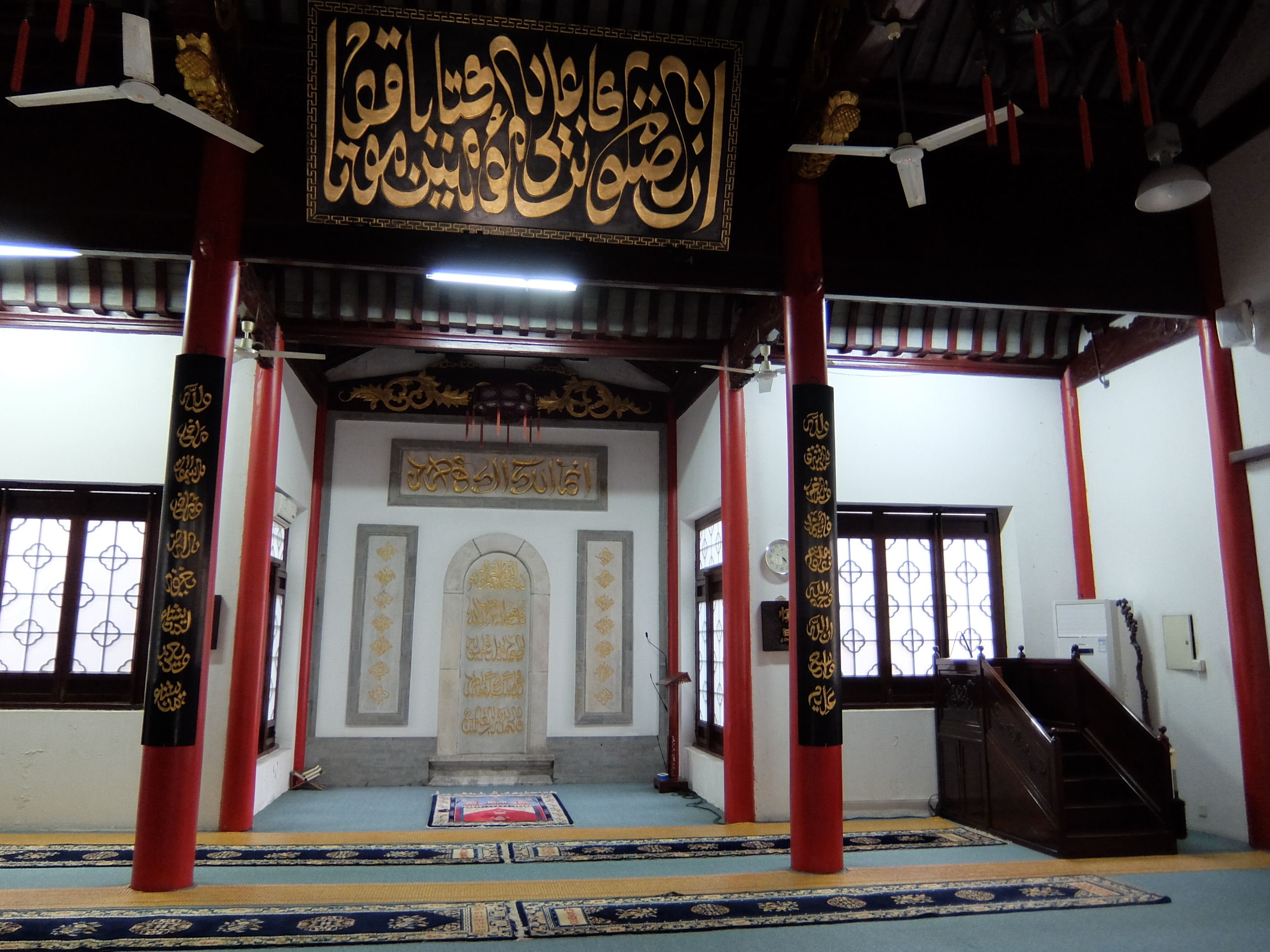
The mosque prayer hall

== See also ==
Caoqiao Mosque
- Traditional Chinese: 草橋清真寺
- Simplified Chinese: 草桥清真寺
Transcriptions
Standard Mandarin
- Hanyu Pinyin: Cǎoqiáo Qīngzhēnsì

- Islam in China
- List of mosques in China
