= Nanjing Municipal Museum =

Museum in Nanjing, China

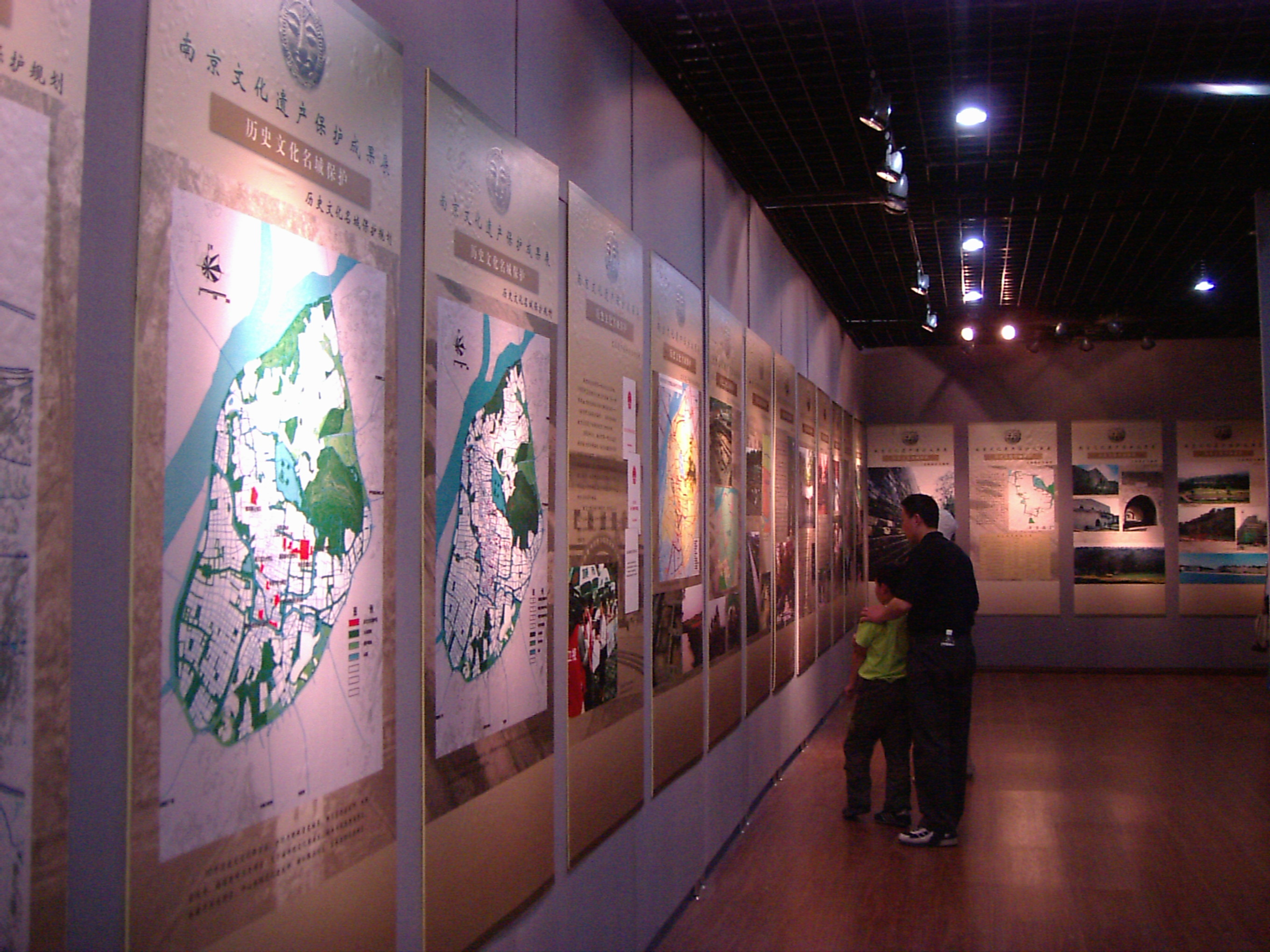
Image of the Nanjing Municipal Museum

The Nanjing Municipal Museum (Chinese: 南京市博物馆) is a municipal public museum in Nanjing, Jiangsu, China. It is owned by the Nanjing City People's Government. It is located inside Chaotian Palace. The museum was formally established in 1978 and is a key historical and cultural site.

With rich and exquisite cultural relics, the museum holds exhibitions such as "Treasures in Nanjing Municipal Museum", "the Feature of the Six Dynasties", "Nanjing: The Capital of Ming Dynasty", "Nanjing: A Home for Royalty", "Seven Overseas Voyages by Zheng He", "Archaeological Achievements in Ten Years", etc.

== See also ==
- Nanjing Museum
- List of museums in China
