= Former Residence of Gan Xi =

Coordinates: 32.0282°N 118.7764°E

- 甘熙故居
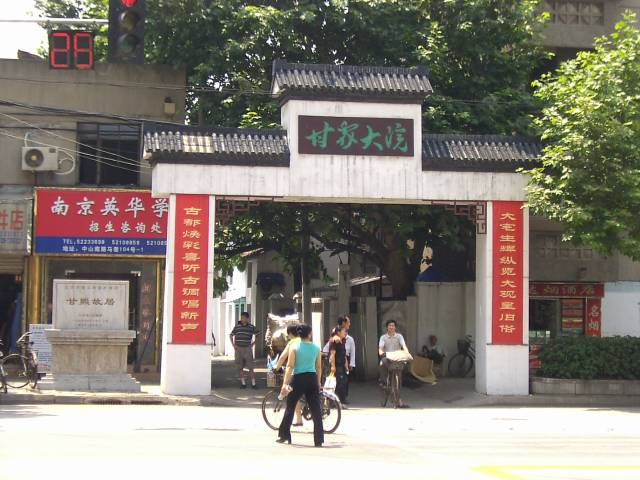
- Entrance
- Interactive map of the Former Residence of Gan Xi area

General information
- Location: No. 15, 17 & 19, Zhongshan South Road, Nanjing, Jiangsu Province, China

The Former Residence of Gan Xi, known as the Grand Courtyard of the Gan Clan, is located on Zhongshan South Road, Nanjing, Jiangsu Province, China. It lies next to Nan Bu Ting (南捕厅), the South station of the former Nanjing Police Station. It was built in the reign of the Jiaqing Emperor (1796–1820), the Qing dynasty, and its first owner was Gan Xi's father, Gan Fu. Originally known as "Fraternity Hall" (友恭堂), it now serves as the Nanjing Folk Museum.

There is a well-known claim that the Forbidden City, the largest imperial palace complex, contains 9,999 and a half rooms, and that the largest mandarin estate, namely the Mansion of Confucius’ Descendants in Qufu, supposedly comprised 999 and a half rooms. As a large residence belonging to commoners, the Gan Family Mansion was often said by analogy to contain 99 and a half rooms, though in fact there are over three hundred.

As the Nanjing Folk Museum, it displays an exhibition of handicrafts, including Yixing clay teapot, Chinese paper cutting, miniature engravings, Chinese opera make-up patterns (脸谱), old clocks as well as local snacks. Some parts of the residence are still privately owned or occupied by certain companies.

== Transportation ==
The building is accessible within walking distance north of Sanshanjie Station of Nanjing Metro.
