= Yueyahu Subdistrict =

Yueyahu Subdistrict 月牙湖街道
- Subdistrict
- Location in Jiangsu
- Coordinates: 32.0282°N 118.8318°E
- Country: People's Republic of China
- Province: Jiangsu
- Prefecture-level city: Nanjing
- District: Qinhuai District
- Time zone: UTC+8 (China Standard)

Yueyahu Subdistrict (Chinese: 月牙湖街道; pinyin: Yuèyáhú Jiēdào) is a subdistrict in Qinhuai District, Nanjing, Jiangsu, China. As of 2018, it has 8 residential communities under its administration.

== See also ==
- List of township-level divisions of Jiangsu
