= Yueyahu Township =

Yueyahu Township 月牙湖乡
- Township
- Location in Ningxia
- Coordinates: 38°35′56″N 106°33′46″E
- Country: People's Republic of China
- Autonomous region: Ningxia
- Prefecture-level city: Yinchuan
- District: Xingqing District
- Time zone: UTC+8 (China Standard)

Yueyahu Township (simplified Chinese: 月牙湖乡; traditional Chinese: 月牙湖鄉; pinyin: Yuèyáhú Xiāng) is a township under the administration of Xingqing District, Yinchuan, Ningxia, China. As of 2018, it has 12 villages under its administration.
