= Yueya Lake (Nanjing) =

Lake near Nanjing, China

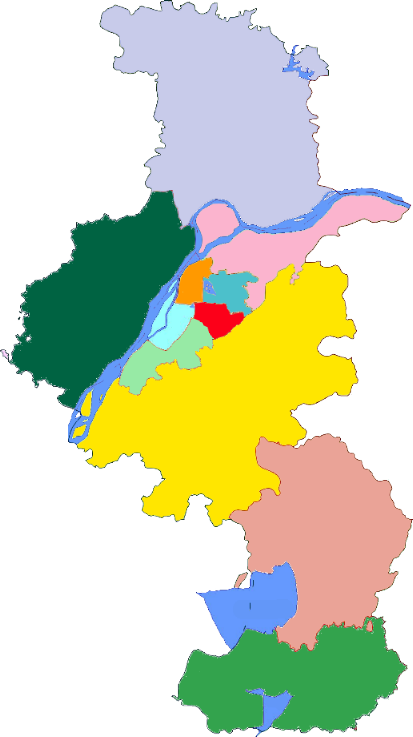
- Location within Nanjing Location within Jiangsu
- Location: Nanjing, Jiangsu
- Coordinates: 32.030°N 118.822°E
- Basin countries: China

Yueya Lake (Chinese: 月牙湖; pinyin: Yuèyá Hú; lit. 'Crescent Moon Lake') is a lake near Nanjing.
