= Xianlin railway station =

Railway station in Nanjing, China

Coordinates: 32.13°N 118.91°E

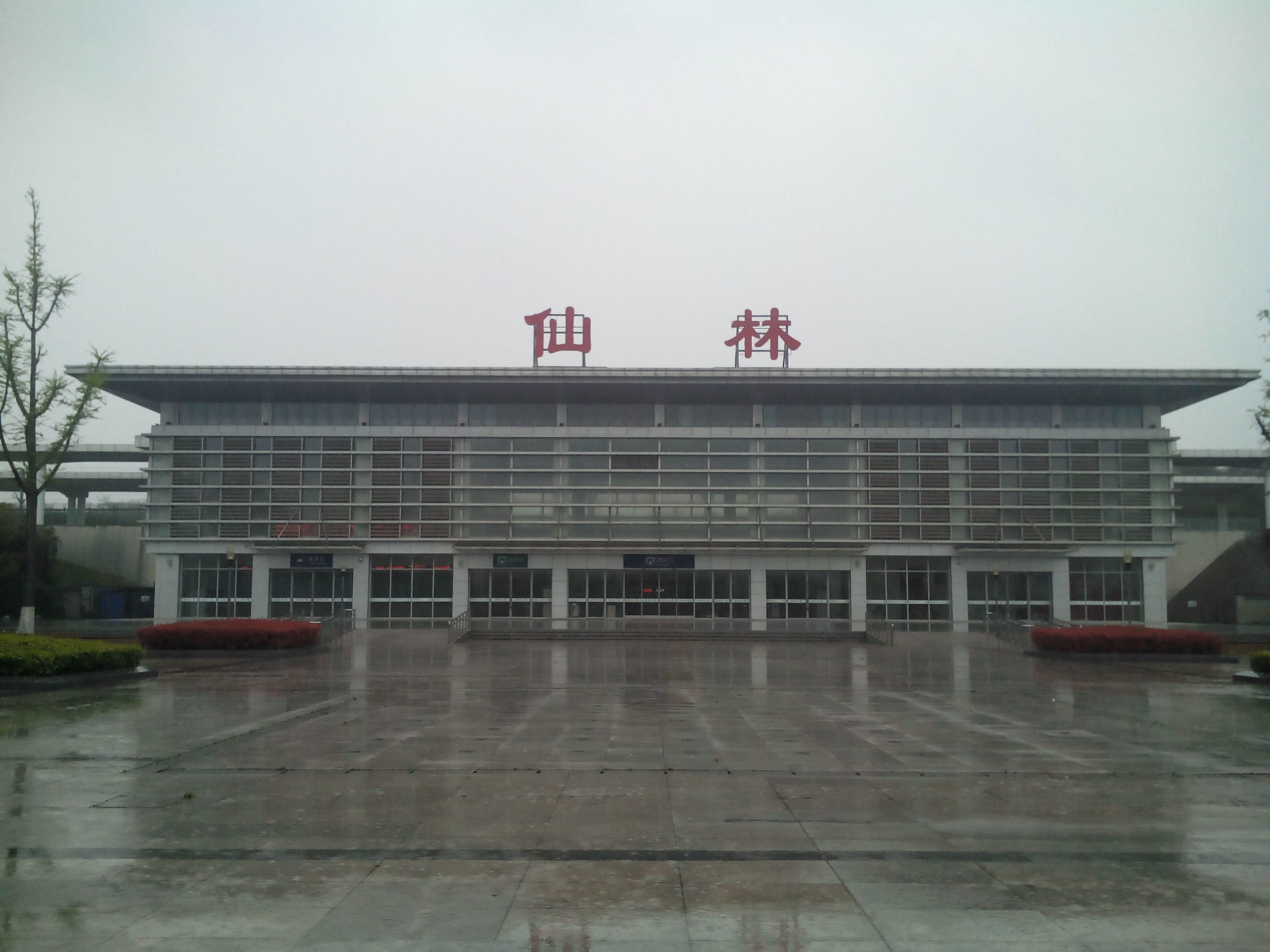
Xianlin Station

Xianlin railway station is a railway station of Shanghai–Nanjing intercity railway located in Qixia District of Nanjing City, People's Republic of China. From 2012, only one train a day in each direction has stopped at this station. This continues to be the case as of 2020. There is a morning train to Shanghai and an afternoon train to Nanjing.

== Notes ==
Preceding station	China Railway High-speed	Following station
Baohuashan towards Shanghai or Shanghai Hongqiao	Shanghai–Nanjing intercity railway Part of the Shanghai–Wuhan–Chengdu passenger-dedicated railway	Nanjing Terminus
Baohuashan towards Shanghai or Shanghai Hongqiao	Shanghai–Nanjing intercity railway Part of the Shanghai–Wuhan–Chengdu passenger-dedicated railway	Nanjing South towards Nanjing
