= Crescent Lake (Alaska) =

Lake in the state of Alaska, United States

- Location within Alaska Location within North America
- Location: Chugach National Forest, east of Cooper Landing, Alaska
- Coordinates: 60°26′54″N 149°31′10″W
- Basin countries: United States

Crescent Lake is a lake near Cooper Landing, Alaska. It may be accessed by trail from near the Crescent Creek campground or from Carter Lake. The lake is somewhat popular with grayling fishermen.
