= Qinhuai, Nanjing =

Qinhuai 秦淮区
- District
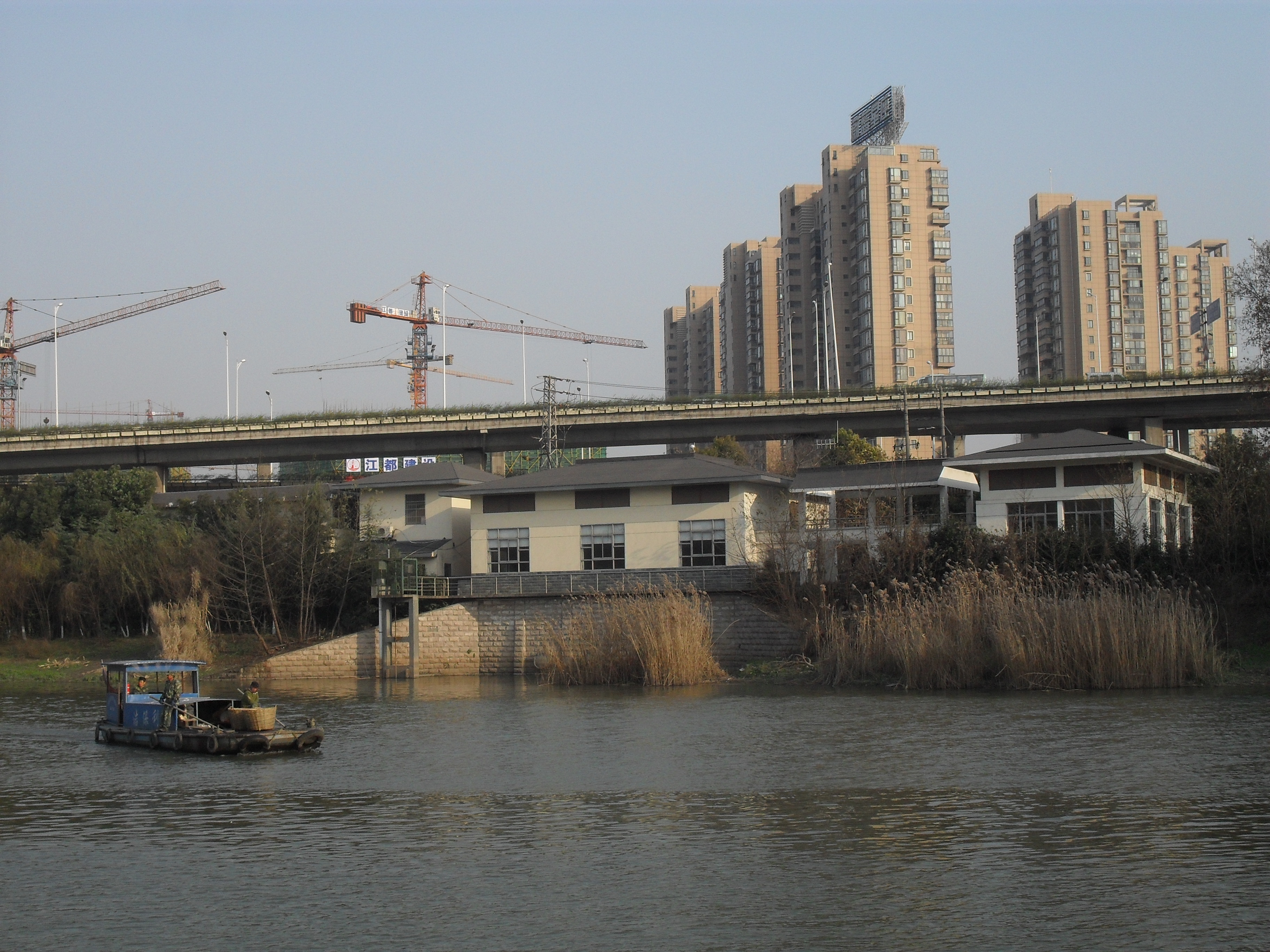

- Location in Jiangsu
- Coordinates: 32°00′11″N 118°48′13″E
- Country: People's Republic of China
- Province: Jiangsu
- Sub-provincial city: Nanjing

Area
  - Total: 49.11 km^{2} (18.96 sq mi)

Population (2018)
  - Total: 1,032,000
  - Density: 21,010/km^{2} (54,430/sq mi)
- Time zone: UTC+8 (China Standard)
- Postal code: 210001
- Area code: 025
District map
Subdivisions of Nanjing, Jiangsu
City Proper
1	Xuanwu
2	Qinhuai
3	Jianye
4	Gulou
5	Yuhuatai
6	Qixia
Suburban
7	Jiangning
8	Pukou
9	Luhe
Rural
10	Lishui
11	Gaochun
- Website: njqh.gov.cn

Qinhuai District (simplified Chinese: 秦淮区; traditional Chinese: 秦淮區; pinyin: Qínhuái Qū) is one of 11 districts of Nanjing, the capital of Jiangsu province, China.

== Administrative subdivisions ==
Qinhuai has administrative jurisdiction over the following 12 subdistricts:

Name	Chinese (S)	Hanyu Pinyin	Population (2010)	Area (km^{2})
Wulaocun Subdistrict	五老村街道	Wǔlǎocūn Jiēdào	72,881	0.63
Hongwulu Subdistrict	洪武路街道	Hóngwǔlù Jiēdào	109,385	2.73
Daguanglu Subdistrict	大光路街道	Dàguānglù Jiēdào	78,475	2.2
Ruijinlu Subdistrict	瑞金路街道	Ruìjīnlù Jiēdào	75,756	2.11
Yueyahu Subdistrict	月牙湖街道	Yuèyáhú Jiēdào	70,546	3.15
Guanghualu Subdistrict	光华路街道	Guānghuálù Jiēdào	84,085	10.92
Chaotiangong Subdistrict	朝天宫街道	Cháotiāngōng Jiēdào	110,833	1.34
Qinhong Subdistrict	秦虹街道	Qínhóng Jiēdào	81,332	1.94
Fuzimiao Subdistrict	夫子庙街道	Fūzǐmiào Jiēdào	73,308	2.94
Honghua Subdistrict	红花街道	Hónghuā Jiēdào	112,254	13
Shuangtang Subdistrict	双塘街道	Shuāngtáng Jiēdào	101,553	2.47
Zhonghuamen Subdistrict	中华门街道	Zhōnghuámén Jiēdào	37,508	2.17

In 2013, Baixia merged into Qinhuai gaining seven additional subdistricts.

== Important areas in Qinhuai District ==
- Caoqiao Mosque
- Fuzimiao
- Zhonghua Gate
- Bao'ensi

== Tourism ==
The county houses many ancient bridges, such as Xuanjin Bridge.

== See also ==
- Qinhuai Lantern Fair
