= Zhonghuamen station =

Nanjing Metro station

Coordinates: 32°00′24″N 118°46′29″E

Zhonghuamen 中华门
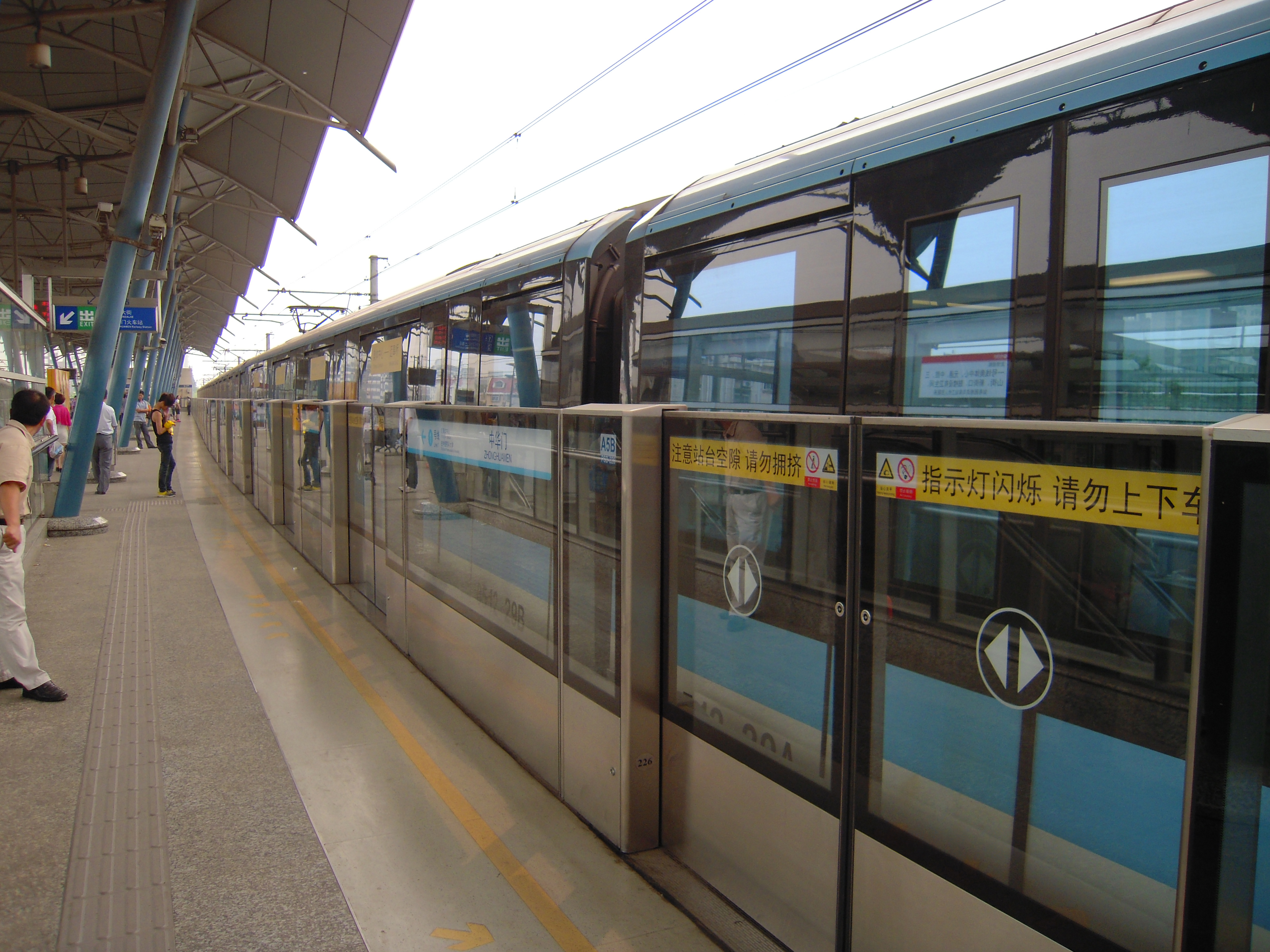

General information
- Location: West Yuhua Road (雨花西路); Yuhuatai District, Nanjing, Jiangsu; China
- Operated by: Nanjing Metro Co. Ltd.
- Line(s): Line 1

Construction
- Structure type: Elevated

Other information
- Station code: 117

History
- Opened: 3 September 2005

Services
Preceding station	Nanjing Metro	Following station
Sanshanjie towards Baguazhoudaqiaonan	Line 1	Andemen towards CPU

Zhonghuamen station (simplified Chinese: 中华门站; traditional Chinese: 中華門站; pinyin: Zhōnghuámén Zhàn) is a station of Line 1 of the Nanjing Metro. It started operations on 3 September 2005 as part of the line's Phase I from Maigaoqiao to Andemen. (Note: The section from Andemen to Olympic Stadium that initially opened as Line 1 was re-designated as Line 10 when the latter opened in 2014.)

== Around the station ==
- Gate of China. The metro station is named after the gate.
- Zhonghuamen railway station
