= Yuantong station =

Nanjing Metro interchange station

Coordinates: 31°59′44″N 118°43′18″E

Yuantong 元通
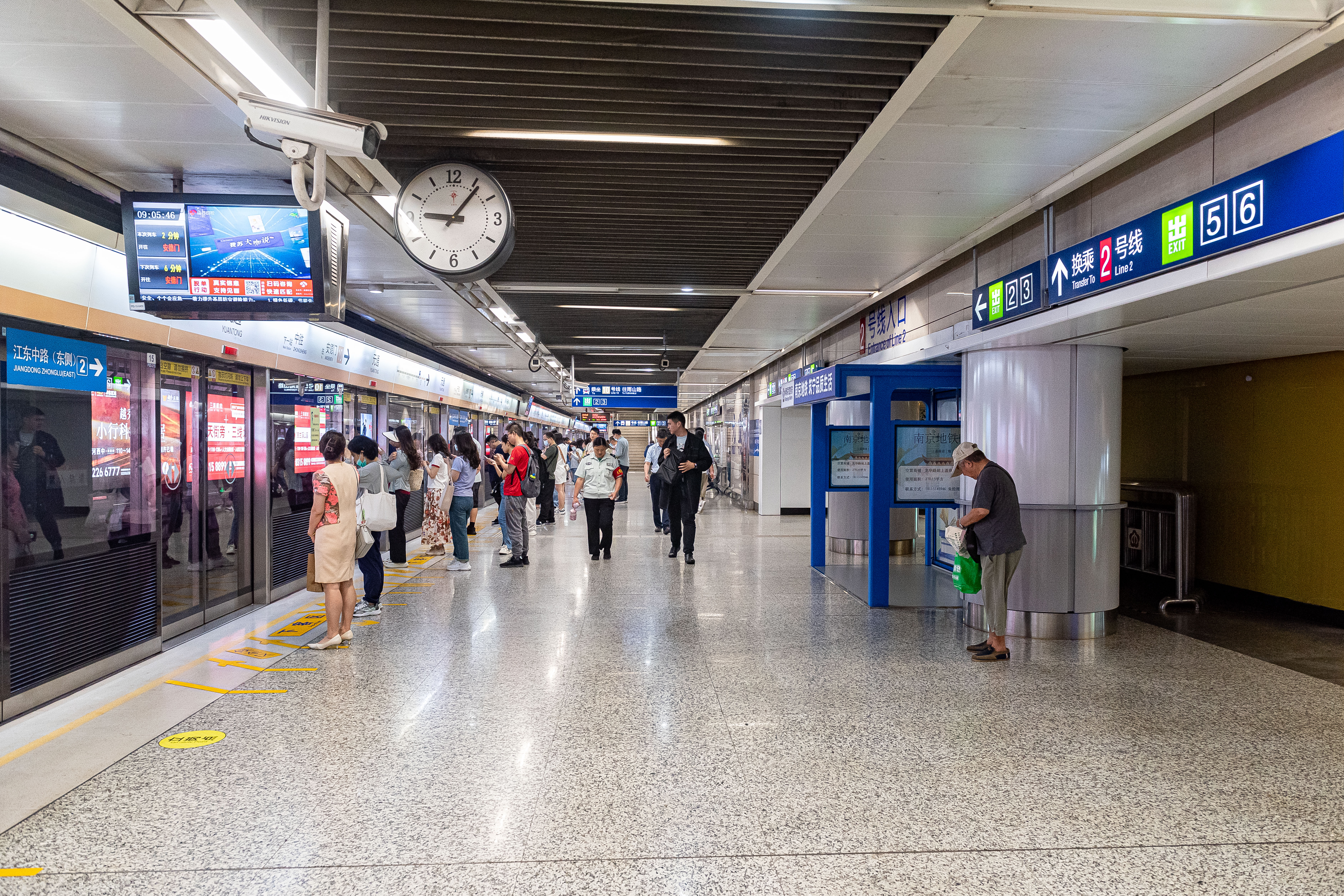
- Line 10 platform

General information
- Other names: Nanjing International Expo Centre
- Location: Hexi Street (河西大街) and Middle Jiangdong Road (江东中路); Jianye District, Nanjing, Jiangsu; China
- Lines: Line 2; Line 10

Other information
- Station code: 207 (Line 2); 1014 (Line 10)

History
- Opened: 3 September 2005 (as Line 1); 28 May 2010 (Line 2)

Services
Preceding station	Nanjing Metro	Following station
Yurundajie towards Yuzui	Line 2	Olympic Stadium East towards Jingtianlu
Zhongsheng towards Dongqilu	Line 10	Olympic Stadium towards Yushanlu
Location

Yuantong station (Chinese: 元通站; pinyin: Yuántōng Zhàn) is an interchange station between Line 2 and Line 10 of the Nanjing Metro. The Line 10 station began operations on 3 September 2005 as part of Line 1's Phase I that ran from Maigaoqiao to Olympic Stadium, while the interchange with Line 2 opened when that line opened on 28 May 2010. On 1 July 2014, with the opening of Line 10, the former branch of Line 1 from Andemen to Olympic Stadium became re-designated as Line 10.

The theme of the Line 2 station's decorations is Lantern Festival.

The decoration wall of the Line 10 station is called Sparkling New City.

== Around the station ==
- Nanjing International Expo Center
- Hexi Central Park
- Jinling Conference Center
- Nanjing IFC
- Nanjing International Expo Center
