= Zhongsheng station =

Nanjing Metro station

Coordinates: 31°59′16″N 118°43′59″E

Zhongsheng 中胜
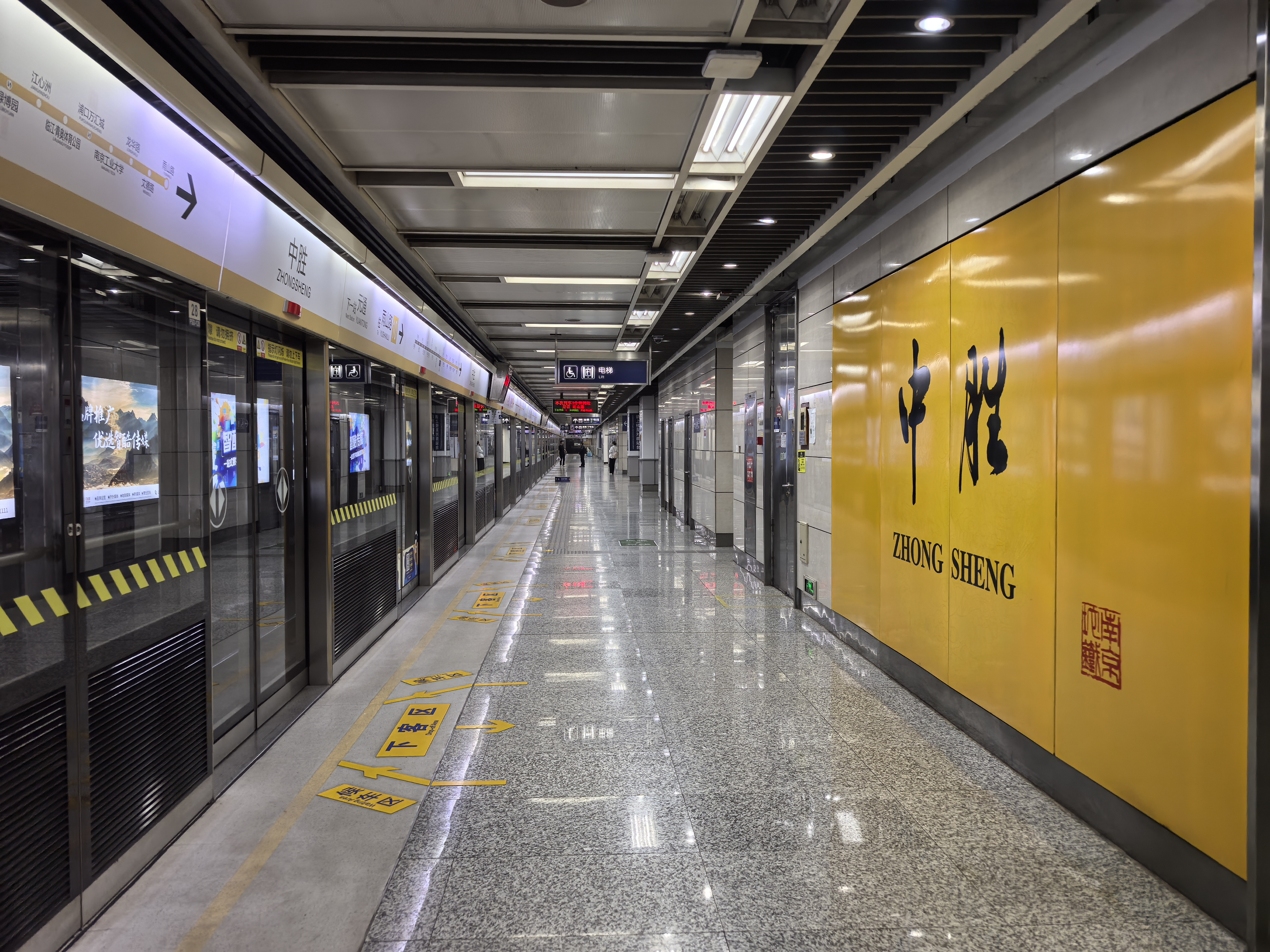

General information
- Location: Jianye District, Nanjing, Jiangsu; China
- Lines: Line 7 Line 10

History
- Opened: 3 September 2005 (as Line 1)

Services
Preceding station	Nanjing Metro	Following station
Xinchengkejiyuan towards Xianxinlu	Line 7	Jialingjiangdongjie towards Xishanqiao
Xiaohang towards Dongqilu	Line 10	Yuantong towards Yushanlu
Location

Zhongsheng station (simplified Chinese: 中胜站; traditional Chinese: 中勝站; pinyin: Zhōngshèng Zhàn) is a railway station on Line 10 of the Nanjing Metro. When it began operations on 3 September 2005, it was part of Nanjing Metro Line 1's Phase I from Maigaoqiao to Olympic Stadium. On 1 July 2014, with the opening of Line 10, the former branch of Line 1 from Andemen to Olympic Stadium became re-designated as Line 10. On 28 December 2023, with the opening of the southern part of Line 7, it became an interchange station between Line 7 and Line 10.
