= Xiaohang station =

Nanjing Metro station

Coordinates: 31°58′59″N 118°44′41″E

Xiaohang 小行
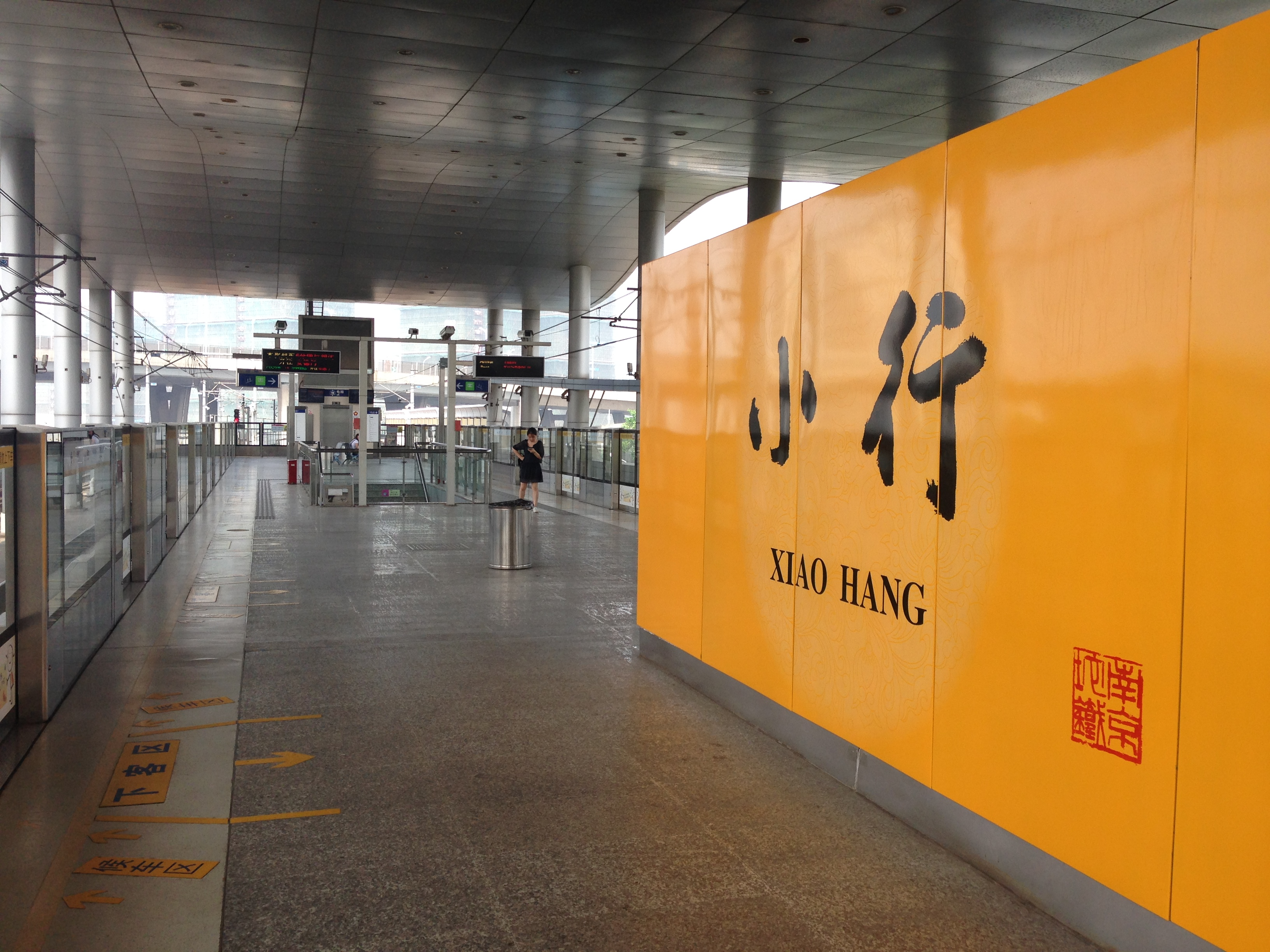

General information
- Location: Yuhuatai District, Nanjing, Jiangsu; China
- Operated by: Nanjing Metro Co. Ltd.
- Line(s): Line 10

Construction
- Structure type: Elevated

Other information
- Station code: 1012

History
- Opened: 3 September 2005 (as Line 1); 1 July 2014 (as Line 10)

Services
Preceding station	Nanjing Metro	Following station
Andemen Terminus	Line 10	Zhongsheng towards Yushanlu

Xiaohang station (Chinese: 小行站; pinyin: Xiǎoháng Zhàn) is a station of Line 10 of the Nanjing Metro. It started operations on 3 September 2005 as part of Line 1's Phase I that ran from Maigaoqiao to Olympic Stadium. On 1 July 2014, with the opening of Line 10, the former branch of Line 1 from Andemen to Olympic Stadium became re-designated as Line 10.
