= Hongshan Zoo station =

Nanjing Metro station

Coordinates: 32°05′48″N 118°48′08″E

Hongshan Zoo station 红山动物园站

General information
- Location: Xuanwu District, Nanjing, Jiangsu; China
- Operator: Nanjing Metro Co. Ltd.
- Line: Line 1

Construction
- Structure type: Elevated

Other information
- Station code: 126

History
- Opened: 3 September 2005

Services
Preceding station	Nanjing Metro	Following station
Maigaoqiao towards Baguazhoudaqiaonan	Line 1	Nanjing Railway Station towards CPU
Location

Hongshan Zoo station (simplified Chinese: 红山动物园站; traditional Chinese: 紅山動物園站; pinyin: Hóngshān Dòngwùyuán Zhàn; lit. 'red hill zoo station') is a station of Line 1 of the Nanjing Metro. It started operations on 3 September 2005 as part of the line's Phase I from Maigaoqiao to Andemen. (Note: The section from Andemen to Olympic Stadium that initially opened as Line 1 was re-designated as Line 10 when the latter opened in 2014.)

== Around the station ==
- Nanjing Hongshan Forest Zoo
