= Pukouwanhuicheng station =

Metro station in Nanjing, China

Pukouwanhuicheng 浦口万汇城
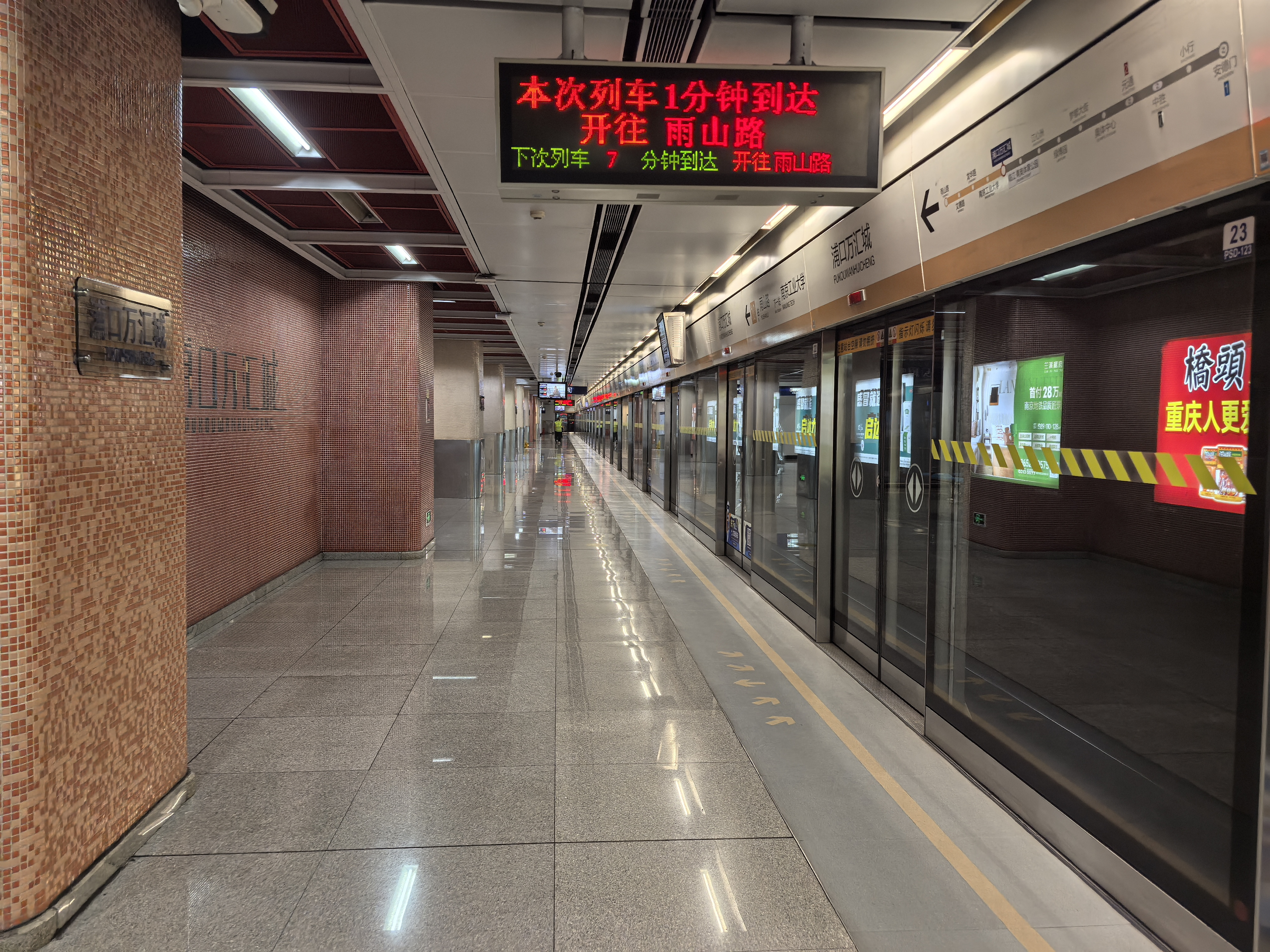

General information
- Location: Pukou District, Nanjing, Jiangsu; China
- Coordinates: 32.063511°N 118.652778°E
- Operated by: Nanjing Metro Co. Ltd.
- Line: Line 10

Construction
- Structure type: Underground

History
- Opened: 1 July 2014

Services
Preceding station	Nanjing Metro	Following station
Linjiang / YOGSP towards Dongqilu	Line 10	Nanjing Tech towards Yushanlu
Location

Pukouwanhuicheng station (Chinese: 浦口万汇城站) is a station of Line 10 of the Nanjing Metro. It started operations on 1 July 2014.
