= Jiangxinzhou station =

Metro station in Nanjing, China

Jiangxinzhou 江心洲
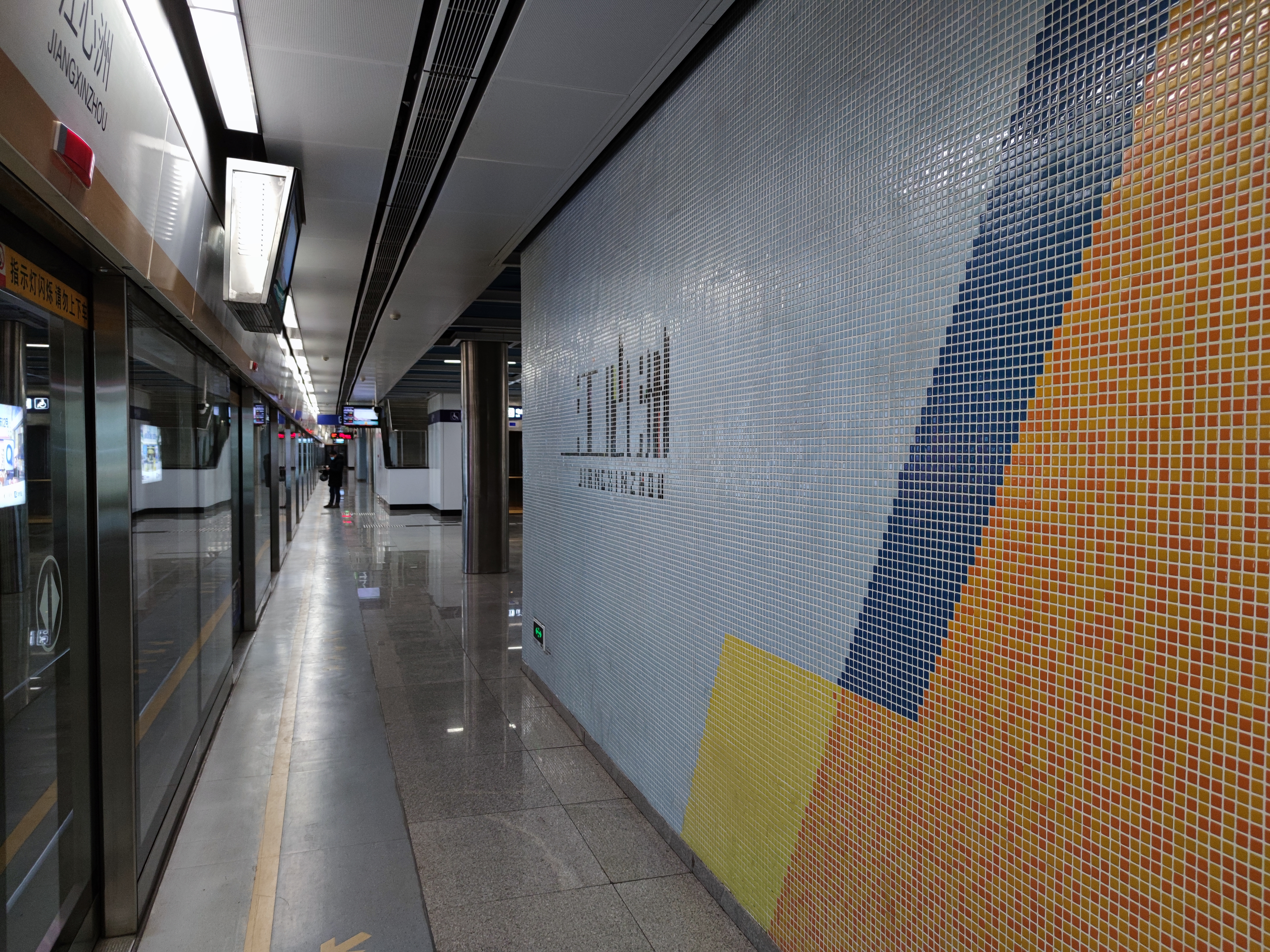

General information
- Location: Pukou District, Nanjing, Jiangsu; China
- Operated by: Nanjing Metro Co. Ltd.
- Line: Line 10

Construction
- Structure type: Underground

History
- Opened: 1 July 2014

Services
Preceding station	Nanjing Metro	Following station
Lüboyuan towards Dongqilu	Line 10	Linjiang / YOGSP towards Yushanlu
Location

Jiangxinzhou station (Chinese: 江心洲站) is a station of Line 10 of the Nanjing Metro. It started operations on 1 July 2014.
