= Longhualu station =

Metro station in Nanjing, China

Longhualu 龙华路
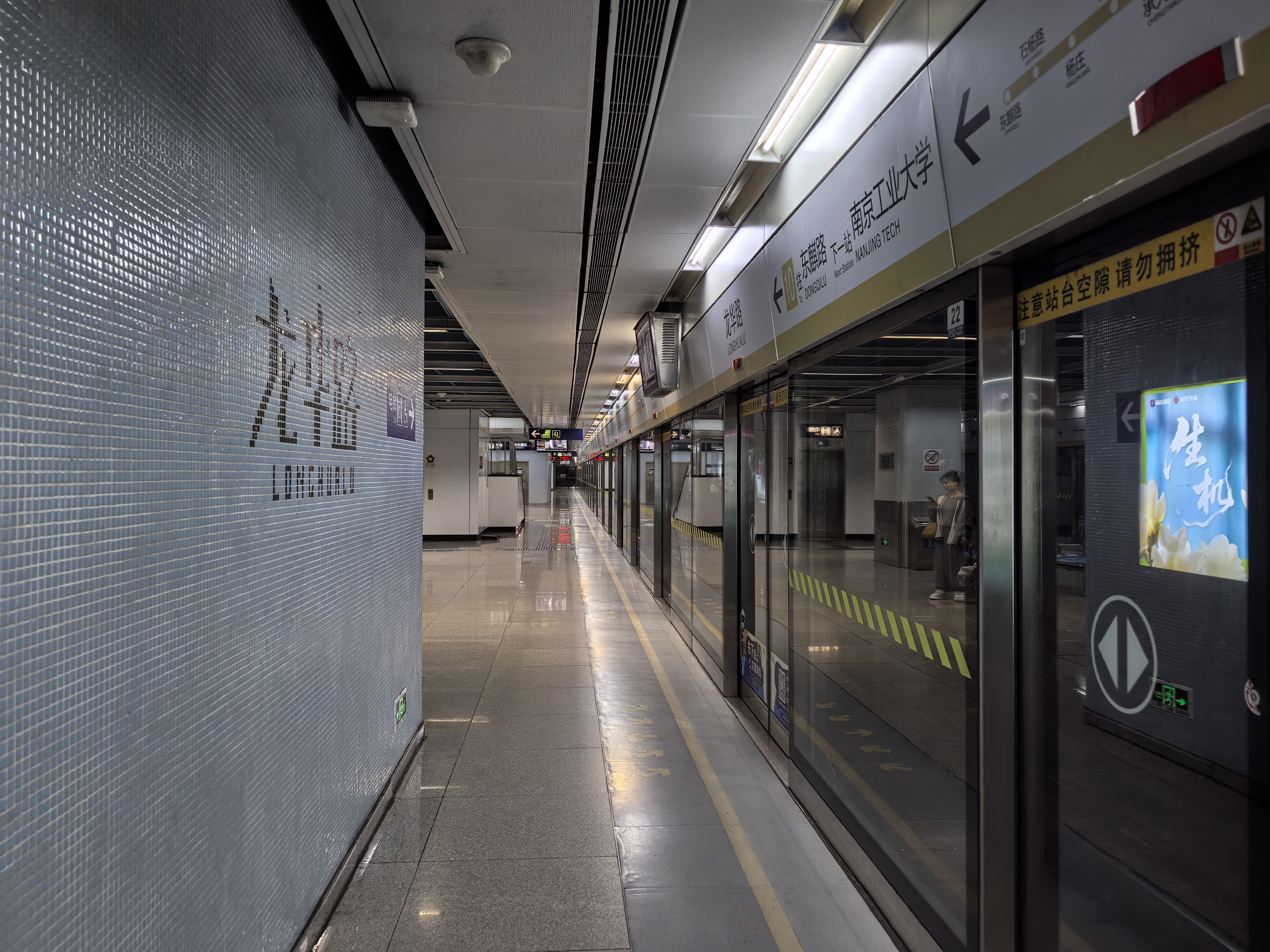

General information
- Location: Pukou District, Nanjing, Jiangsu; China
- Coordinates: 32.066894°N 118.630185°E
- Operated by: Nanjing Metro Co. Ltd.
- Line: Line 10

Construction
- Structure type: Underground

History
- Opened: 1 July 2014

Services
Preceding station	Nanjing Metro	Following station
Nanjing Tech towards Dongqilu	Line 10	Wendelu towards Yushanlu
Location

Longhualu station (Chinese: 龙华路站) is a station of Line 10 of the Nanjing Metro. It started operations on 1 July 2014.
