= Mengdudajie station =

Metro station in Nanjing, China

Mengdudajie 梦都大街
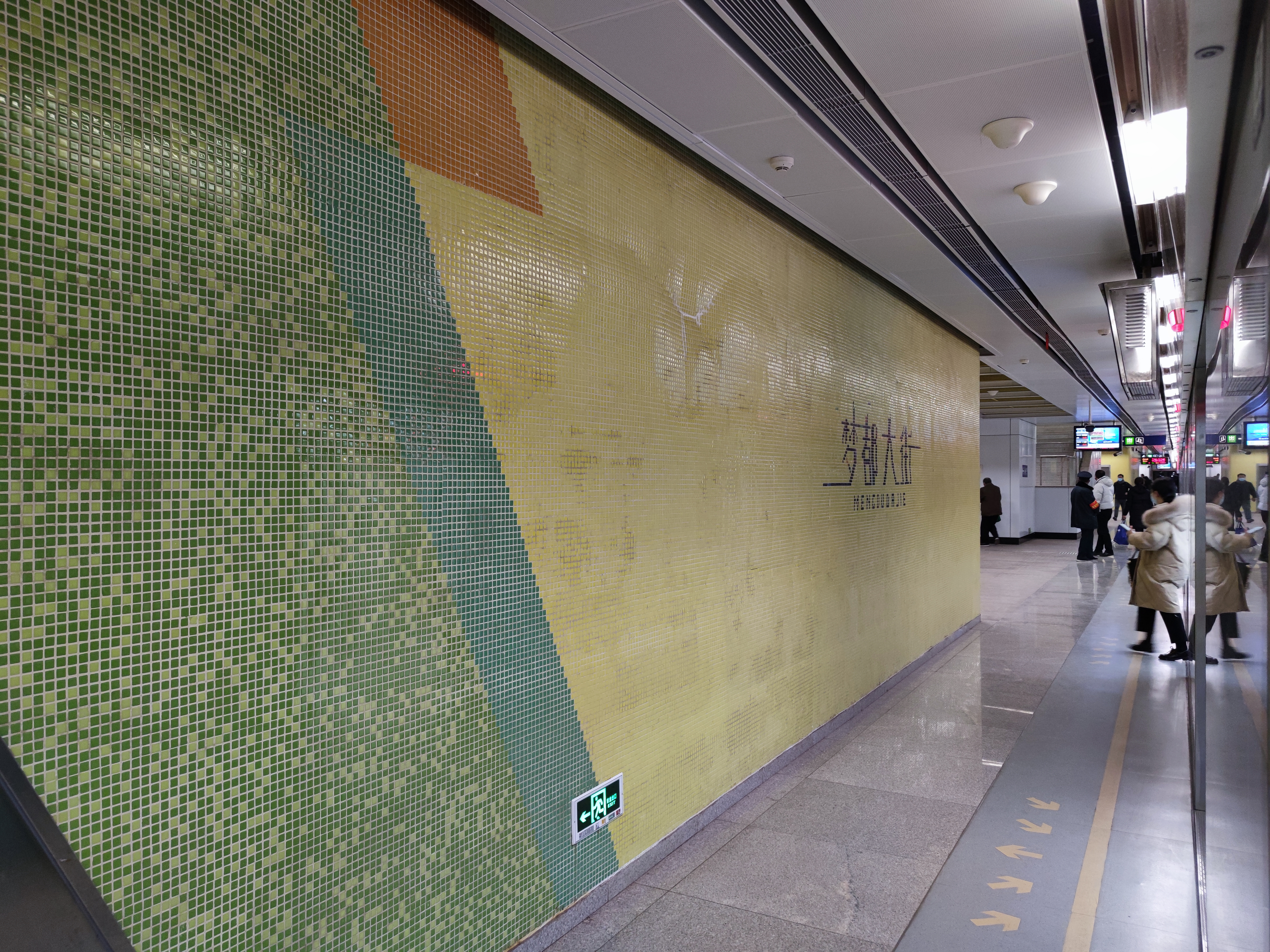

General information
- Location: Pukou District, Nanjing, Jiangsu; China
- Operated by: Nanjing Metro Co. Ltd.
- Line: Line 10

Construction
- Structure type: Underground

History
- Opened: 1 July 2014

Services
Preceding station	Nanjing Metro	Following station
Olympic Stadium towards Dongqilu	Line 10	Lüboyuan towards Yushanlu
Location

Mengdudajie station (Chinese: 梦都大街站) is a station of Line 10 of the Nanjing Metro. It started operations on 1 July 2014.
