= Linjiang / YOGSP station =

Metro station in Nanjing, China

Linjiang / YOGSP 临江·青奥体育公园
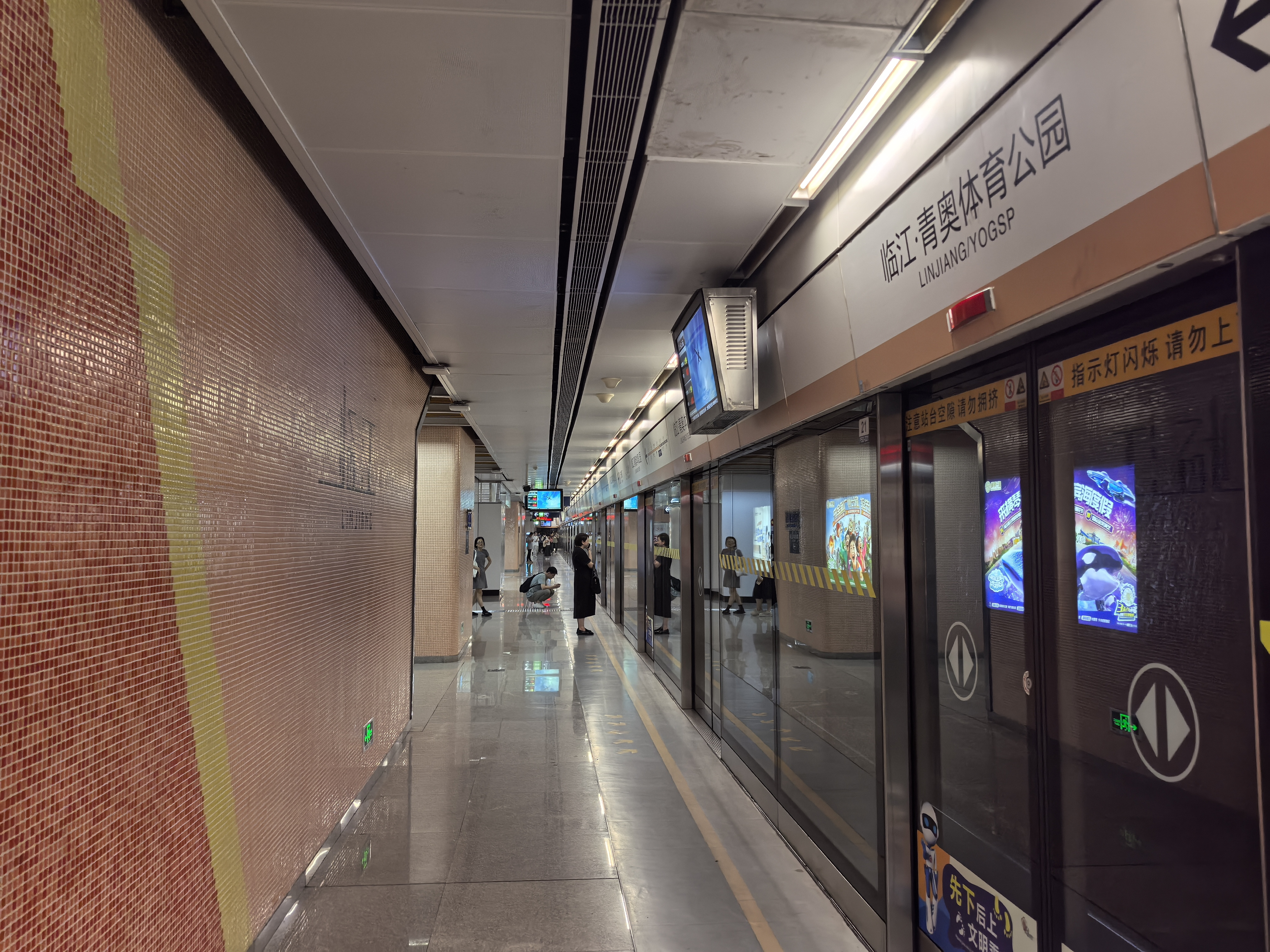

General information
- Location: Pukou District, Nanjing, Jiangsu; China
- Operated by: Nanjing Metro Co. Ltd.
- Line: Line 10

Construction
- Structure type: Underground

History
- Opened: 1 July 2014

Services
Preceding station	Nanjing Metro	Following station
Jiangxinzhou towards Dongqilu	Line 10	Pukouwanhuicheng towards Yushanlu
Location

Linjiang / YOGSP station (Chinese: 临江·青奥体育公园站) is a station of Line 10 of the Nanjing Metro. It started operations on 1 July 2014.
