= Nanjing University of Technology station =

Metro station in Nanjing, China

Nanjing Tech 南京工业大学
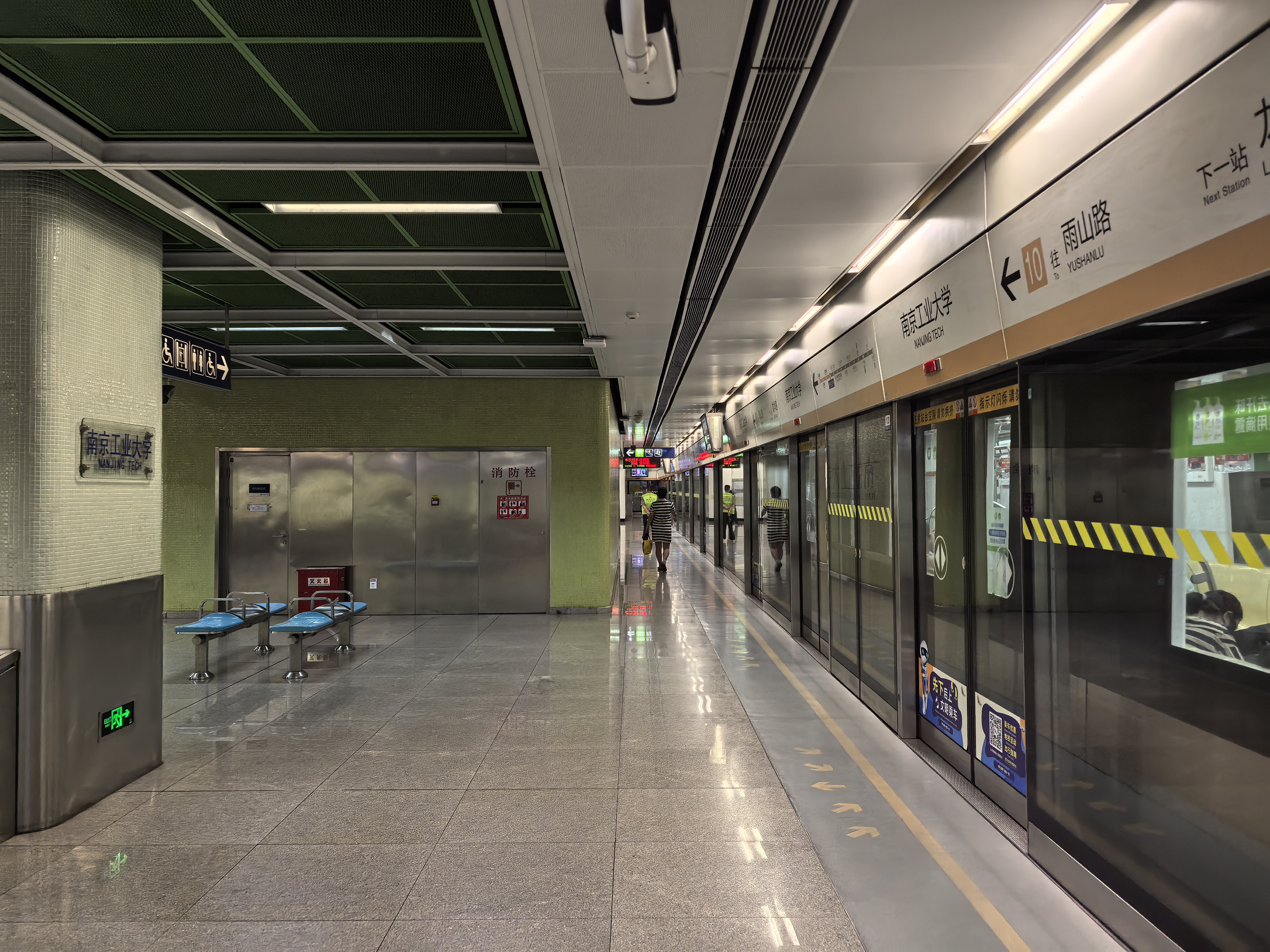

General information
- Location: Pukou District, Nanjing, Jiangsu; China
- Coordinates: 32.069011°N 118.643057°E
- Operated by: Nanjing Metro Co. Ltd.
- Line: Line 10

Construction
- Structure type: Underground

History
- Opened: 1 July 2014

Services
Preceding station	Nanjing Metro	Following station
Pukouwanhuicheng towards Dongqilu	Line 10	Longhualu towards Yushanlu
Location

Nanjing Tech station (Chinese: 南京工业大学站) is a station of Line 10 of the Nanjing Metro. It started operations on 1 July 2014.
