= Lüboyuan station =

Metro station in Nanjing, China

Lüboyuan 绿博园
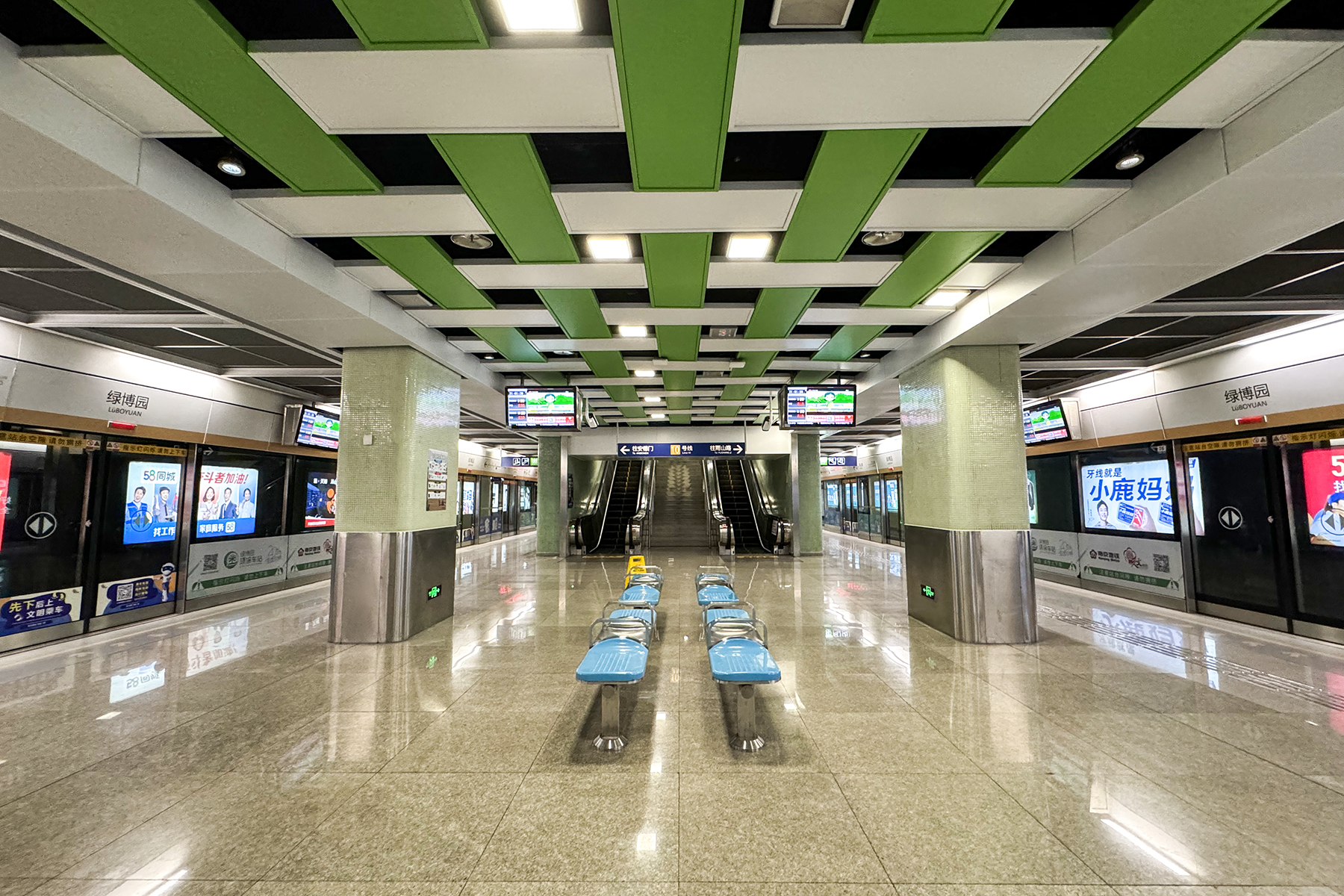

General information
- Location: Jianye District, Nanjing, Jiangsu; China
- Coordinates: 32.0269°N 118.7103°E
- Operated by: Nanjing Metro Co. Ltd.
- Line: Line 10

Construction
- Structure type: Underground

History
- Opened: 1 July 2014

Services
Preceding station	Nanjing Metro	Following station
Mengdudajie towards Dongqilu	Line 10	Jiangxinzhou towards Yushanlu
Location

Lüboyuan station (Chinese: 绿博园站; pinyin: Lǜbóyuán zhàn; lit. 'Green Expo Garden station') is a station of Line 10 of the Nanjing Metro. It started operations on 1 July 2014.
