= Wendelu station =

Metro station in Nanjing, China

Wendelu 文德路
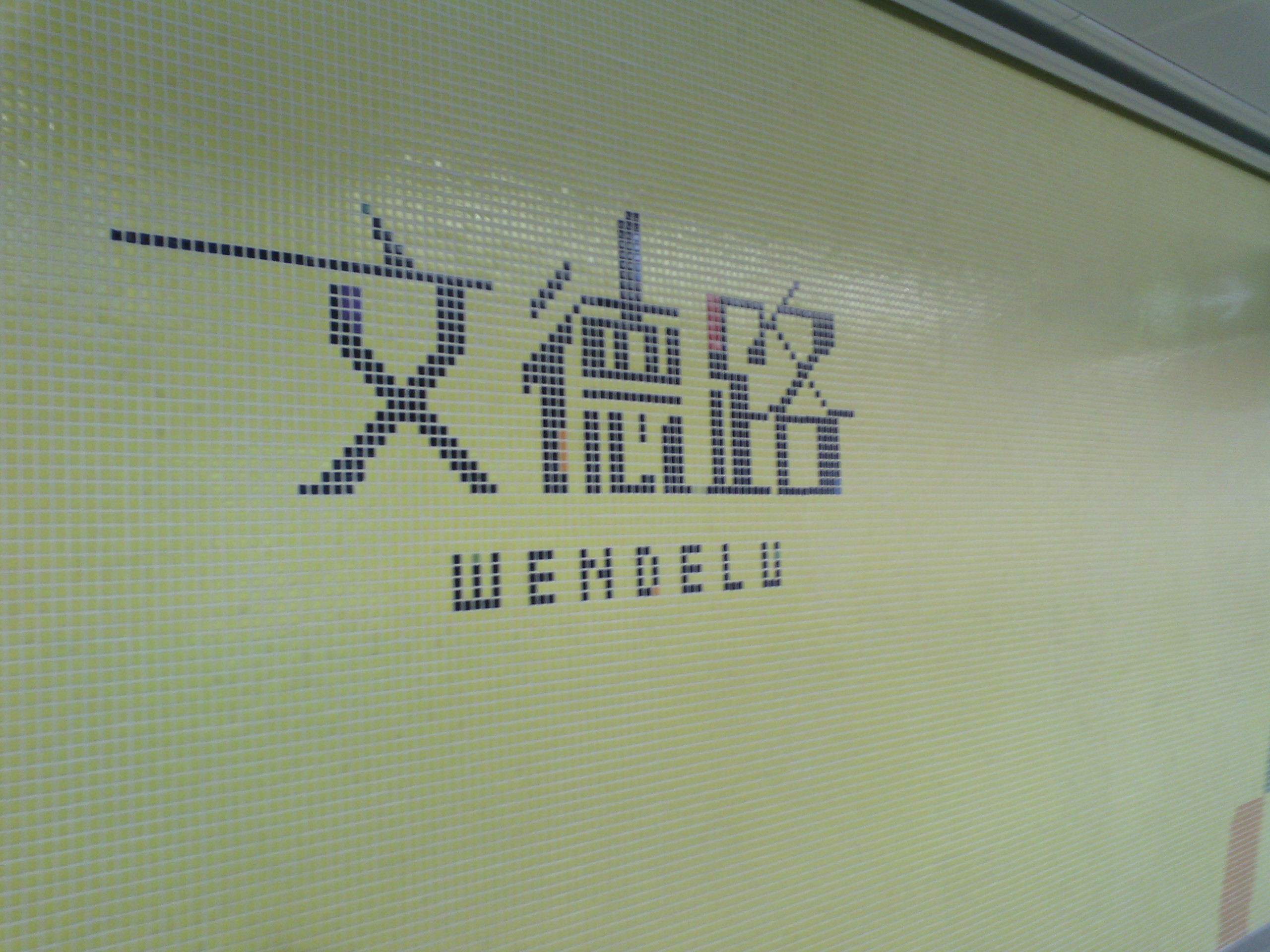

General information
- Location: Pukou District, Nanjing, Jiangsu; China
- Coordinates: 32.059491°N 118.621585°E
- Operated by: Nanjing Metro Co. Ltd.
- Line(s): Line 10

Construction
- Structure type: Underground

History
- Opened: 1 July 2014

Services
Preceding station	Nanjing Metro	Following station
Longhualu towards Andemen	Line 10	Yushanlu Terminus
Location

Wendelu station (Chinese: 文德路站) is a station of Line 10 of the Nanjing Metro. It started operations on 1 July 2014.
