= Zhongsheng =

Zhongsheng may refer to:

- Zhongsheng Group (中升), a multinational automotive retail and services company headquartered in Beijing, China
- Zhongsheng Station (中胜), a station on Line 1 of the Nanjing Metro in Nanjing, China
- Zhongsheng (仲升), the courtesy name of Ban Chao, a general and cavalry commander in ancient China
