= Hongshan Forest Zoo =

- Interactive map of Hongshan Forest Zoo
- 32°05′39″N 118°47′54″E
- Slogan: Animals Come First (一切为了动物)
- Date opened: 1998 (Predecessor Xuanwu Lake Zoo in 1954)
- Location: Xuanwu District, Nanjing, Jiangsu, China
- Land area: 168.03 acres (68.00 ha)
- No. of animals: 3,000+
- No. of species: 260
- Annual visitors: 6 million+ (2023)
- Memberships: Chinese Association of Zoological Gardens
- Major exhibits: Giant Panda Pavilion, Great Ape Pavilion, Wolf Pavilion, Monkey Hill, Gaoligong, Gondwana Land, Tigers Pavilion, Koala Pavilion, Feline in China Pavilion
- Director: Shen Zhijun
- Public transit: Nanjing Metro
- Website: www.njhszoo.com

Hongshan Forest Zoo (Chinese: 红山森林动物园; pinyin: Hóngshān sēnlín dòngwùyuán) is a zoological park in Nanjing, the capital city of Jiangsu province, China. The zoo is the member of the Chinese Association of Zoological Gardens. Located on 168 Heyan Road in the Xuanwu District of Nanjing, it is a 168.03 acres (68.00 ha) park and forest with 85% green coverage rate. The area is divided into three major districts: Xiao Hongshan, Da Hongshan, and Fangniu Mountain, with a total of 27 venues. The zoo houses over 3,000 animals of more than 260 species. Its predecessor, Xuanwu Lake Zoo, was relocated and merged with Hongshan Park on September 28, 1998.

The zoo is the only self-funded public institution of its kind in China. Since its opening in 1998, Hongshan Forest Zoo has been dedicated to wildlife conservation and science education. Despite facing challenges such as a sharp decline in visitors and reduced revenue during the COVID-19 pandemic, the zoo has maintained its ticket price at 40 yuan for 15 years. To support itself, it has implemented various self-sustaining measures, including live-streaming activities and virtual animal adoption programs. It is the first zoo in China to end animal performances in 2011. Subsequently, in 2014, it also stopped visitors from feeding the animals.

On January 30, 2013, Hongshan Forest Zoo was officially designated as a national 4A-level tourism attraction by the Chinese National Tourism Scenic Quality Grading Committee.

== History ==
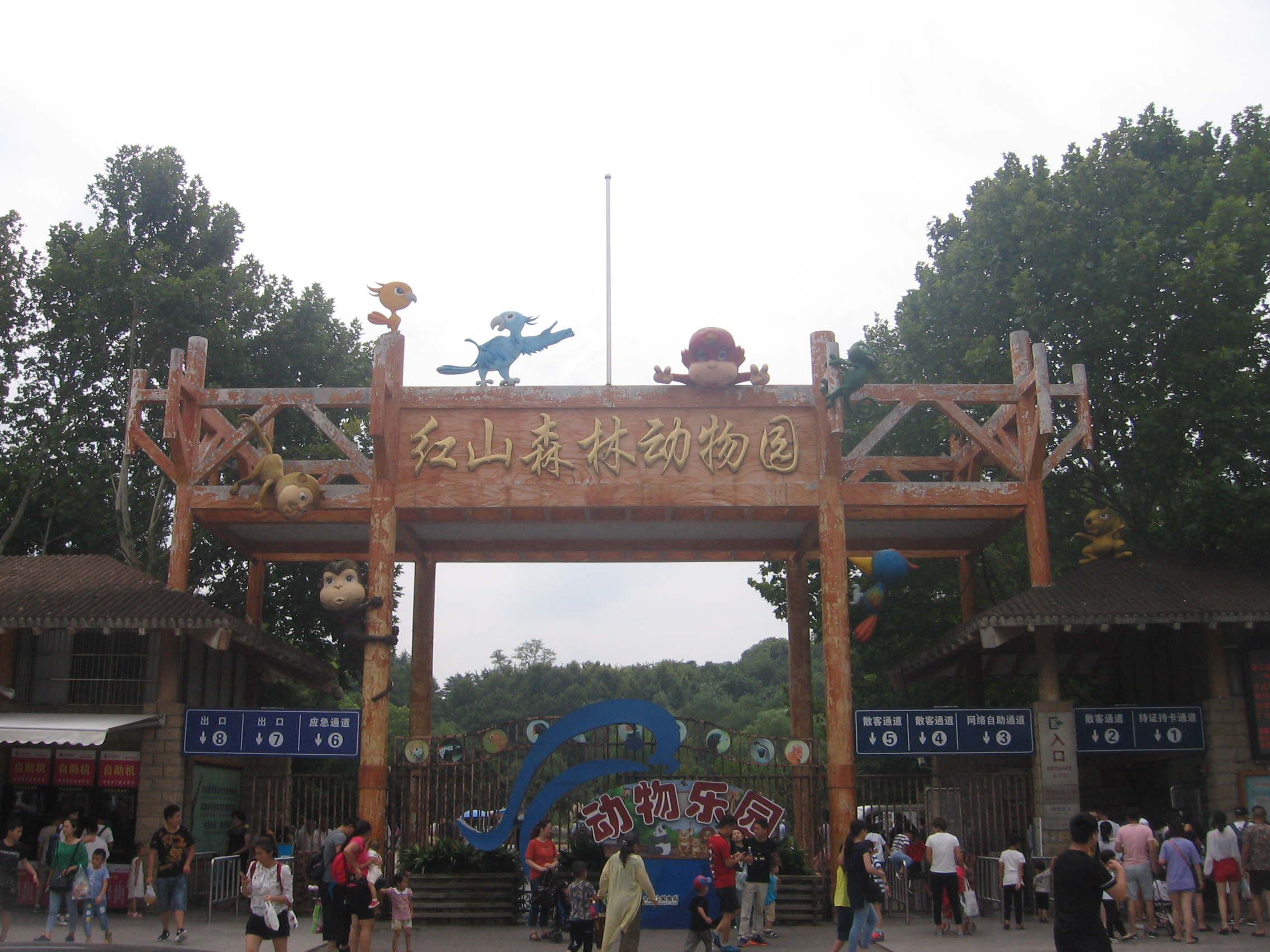
Main Entrance

=== Early years ===
In 1928, Xuanwu Lake Park was established, and it was then called "Wuzhou Park." Chang Zonghui, the director of the Xuanwu Lake Management Bureau at the time, proposed the idea of establishing an "Animal Garden" to the Nanjing government. This suggestion was approved by both Jiangsu Province government and Nanjing City government. However, there were no animals yet for the "Animal Garden".

On September 22, 1928, a group of macaques were transferred from Changzhou First Park to the "Animal Garden." As a result, this group of macaques became the first animals in the history of Hongshan Zoo.

The "Animal Garden" was located at the intersection of Liangzhou and Cuizhou near Xuanwu Lake, occupying a small patch of land by the lake, with an area of only a few dozen square meters. In addition to macaques, the zoo gradually introduced other common animals such as domestic rabbits and mandarin ducks. The garden simply used two large net enclosures to fence off the area, with different animals placed in separate cages, and there was no formal architectural design. The staff consisted of just three full-time workers and one seasonal employee, who managed both the garden and the animals.

On May 14, 1934, Shanghai's "Da Mei Wanbao" published a report titled "The Xuanwu Lake Oddities". It described three "odd individuals": one with a large head, one with a small head, and the last one called the "Half-Body Beauty". Lu Xun commented to a friend, after seeing this report, that two of the three odd individuals were deformed, while the one with the large head was a patient with cerebral edema, which was quite pitiful to be placed in the zoo.

In the end, the "Animal Garden" was destroyed during the Second Sino-Japanese War.

=== Mid-20th century ===
In July 1947, the Nanjing Municipal Government approved the "Organizational Constitution of the Preparatory Committee for the Nanjing Zoological and Botanical Gardens". An 11-member preparatory committee was formed, led by Mei Chengzhang, the director of the Municipal Landscape Management Office. The committee included Zhu Zhangeng, the director of the Central Health Laboratory, Zhang Shouyu, the head of the Horticulture Department at National Central University, Zheng Wanjun, the head of the Forestry Department at National Central University, and Chen Bangjie, a professor of botany at National Central University, among others.

On June 8, 1948, The Nanjing National Government approved the draft of the "Organizational Constitution of the Preparatory Committee for the Nanjing Zoological and Botanical Gardens".

In January 1954, Xuanwu Lake Zoo was completed at Lingzhou within Xuanwu Lake Park and officially welcomed visitors on May 18 of that same year.

Between 1955 and 1980, Xuanwu Lake Zoo underwent substantial expansion, adding a variety of new facilities. These included a monkey hill, an aquarium, small animal enclosures, a crocodile pool, a carnivore house, a bird aviary, bear mountain, a giant panda house, a giraffe house, a great ape house, and a peace pavilion.

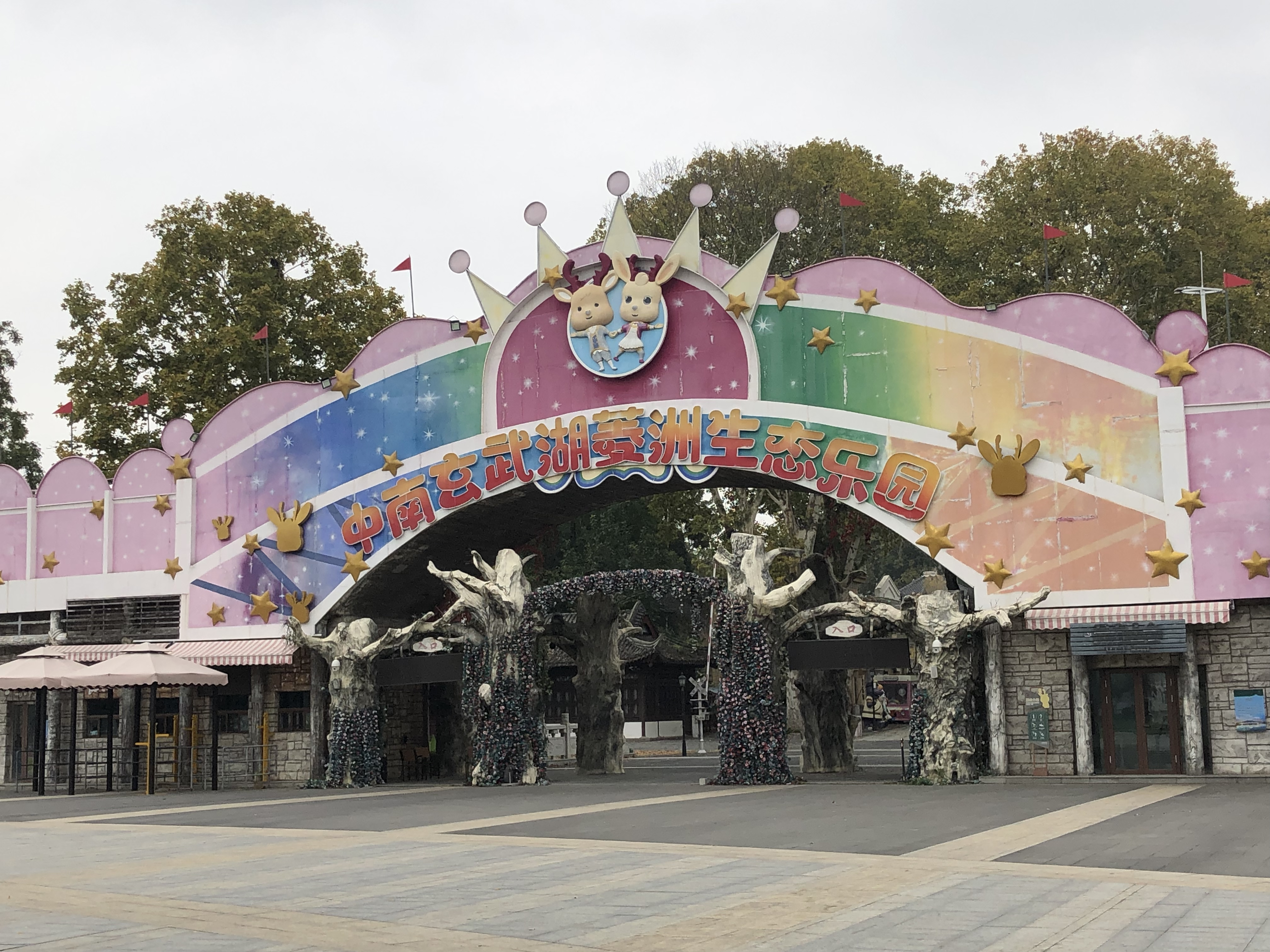
Xuanwu Lake Zoo nowadays

By the end of 1993, Xuanwu Lake Zoo had become one of the breeding bases for Siberian tigers and gray and red kangaroos.

=== 1998 - 2018 ===
On September 28, 1998, Xuanwu Lake Zoo relocated to Hongshan Park and was renamed Nanjing Hongshan Forest Zoo.

In October 2009, the Australia Zone was completed, covering an area of 4,000 square meters, and the concept design of this exhibition area was led by Dr. Carin Harrington from the Hong Kong Golden Bird Foundation.

It was also in 2009 that director Shen Zhijun established the Public Relations and Promotion Department at the zoo. Since then, the zoo has designed numerous park activities, such as planting bamboo for the giant pandas, uncovering the stories of Hongshan's spring, hosting the Fall Animal Carnival, and celebrating the Chinese New Year with the Chinese zodiac culture Festival, among others. Most of these activities were game-based to enhance visitor engagement and experience. In 2010, the zoo launched its "Animal Adoption" program. For an annual fee, adopters could gain hands-on experience as zookeepers and receive regular updates on the animals they supported. However, the program did not attract much interest.

In 2011, the zoo became the first zoo in China to cancel animal performances. The motivation behind this decision arose in 2011, when the Ministry of Housing and Urban-Rural Development of the People's Republic of China (MOHURD) issued "Document No. 172," which, for the first time, mandated the safeguarding of animal welfare and the cessation of all animal performance programs. In 2013, the MOHURD issued Document No. 138, "National Zoo Development Outline," which included the hosting of animal performances among the important criteria for evaluating National Garden Cities and again emphasized the complete elimination of animal performances. However, after the cancellation of animal performances, visitor numbers clearly declined over the next six months.

In 2014, the zoo discovered that visitors feeding the animals had led to nutritional imbalances and health issues for many of the animals. Additionally, this behavior resulted in the development of stereotypical behaviors, where the animals would start reaching out to visitors upon seeing them. Therefore, the zoo then cancelled the sale of animal feed, as well as the animal feeding and photography activities.

In January 2018, the zoo added exhibition areas Gondwana and Africa. A new south entrance was built facing the Xiaohongshan Passenger Station. At the same time, bear valleys, tiger gardens, and leopard houses were renovated based on the zoo's existing terrain. In the same year, the zoo successfully introduced koalas.

=== 2018 - present ===
In 2020, the zoo was closed for 51 days due to the COVID-19 pandemic. As the only self-funded public zoo of its kind in China, over 80% of its revenue came from ticket sales. In 2020, the zoo suffered a loss of over 30 million yuan, accounting for 40% of its usual income. During the most difficult period, the zoo was left with only about 500,000 yuan in its accounts. After much consideration, director Shen decided to withhold employees' half-year performance bonuses, prioritizing the supply of animal feed.

On March 15, 2020, the first day the zoo reopened after being closed for 51 days. It took several measures to avoid overcrowding. It installed barriers in narrow pathways, converting them into one-way routes; security staff were stationed at the smaller venue entrances to manage the flow of visitors. Additionally, a 1-meter-wide, 20-meter-long red carpet was laid outside the north gate, and many local media outlets were invited to cover the reopening. However, the turnout was much lower than anticipated. The zoo set a visitor limit of 20,000, but only 2,247 people entered on that day. Among them, most of them were elderly people doing morning exercises who qualify for the free ticket policy.

In August 2020, when the zoo was at a breaking point, director Shen wrote a letter to then-Mayor of Nanjing, Han Liming, but after more than half a month of deliberation, he still couldn't decide whether to send it. Later, he heard from some officials that mayor Han had shared his interview on social media. This prompted him to make the decision to send the letter, which he did via registered mail. Two weeks later, the city's financial authorities contacted him and allocated 4 million yuan in emergency funds. The tourism group overseeing the zoo then lent an additional 3 million yuan to the zoo. This influx of funds alleviated the zoo's financial strain.

In February of the same year, the zoo launched a live-streaming channel called "Zoo Live" and introduced a "virtual zoo tour" model to showcase animals to viewers through live broadcasts. This program won the Grand Prize for "Top Ten Science Popularization Brand Activities" from the Jiangsu Association of Science & Technology Museums in 2020.

Back in 2010, the zoo had launched its "Animal Adoption" program. For an annual fee, adopters could gain hands-on experience as zookeepers and receive regular updates on the animals they supported. However, the program did not attract much interest. In 2019, Mao Pingping, an adopter, took in a muntjac, but only five people in total participated in the program that year. The program attracted little public attention until Director Shen gained widespread recognition for his speech in 2020.

In July 2020, director Shen said in a speech that "some people said there would be a wave of 'revenge tourism' after the pandemic, but I've been waiting over three months, and still, not many people have come to 'take revenge' on me." His statement about "seeking revenge" instantly went viral online. As pandemic restrictions eased, large numbers of visitors began flocking to the zoo, and the "Virtual Animal Adoption" program also surged in popularity. Among the animals, capybaras became one of the most popular for virtual adoptions.

Soon after, Hongshan Zoo ventured into cultural and creative products, launching a series of souvenirs including refrigerator magnets, plush toys, hats, scarves, and eco-friendly bags. These products became highly popular with visitors, especially among young people, and provided the zoo with an additional revenue stream.

During the 2023 Chinese New Year holiday break, the number of visitors to the zoo exceeded 10,000 per day. There was a noticeable shift in the demographic composition of the visitors, with the majority previously being children and seniors. Now, nearly 40% of the visitors are young people.

=== Escapes ===
==== Porcupine ====
To promote harmonious coexistence between animals and humans, the zoo has been conducting the "Xiao Hongshan Biodiversity Conservation and Public Education" survey since 2014. The zoo set up 20 infrared cameras in the Xiao Hongshan wildlife release area. The survey revealed that small animals, such as weasels, raccoon dogs, badgers, and red-bellied tree squirrels, frequently appeared in the area.

In 2019, a porcupine accidentally escaped from the zoo's captive area. Two years later, an infrared camera in the zoo’s wildlife release area captured its image. Since porcupines once had a wild distribution in the Xiao Hongshan area, the zoo decided to experiment by releasing another porcupine. The researchers believed that if the two porcupines met in the wild, interacted, and successfully bred, it would indicate that the hilly environment in Nanjing could potentially support the porcupine species once again.

On August 30, 2021, researchers released another captive porcupine named "Jushu," a female, and fitted her with an ear tag. The porcupine captured by the infrared camera was identified as a male. Soon after, the infrared cameras recorded the two porcupines walking together peacefully, confirming their successful interaction.

==== Orangutan "Le Shen" ====
On the afternoon of June 5, 2019, at 1:30 p.m., the orangutan Le Shen used a bed sheet to pull open the electric fence and escaped onto the roof of Great Ape Pavilion. Once discovered, the zookeeper immediately notified relevant staff. Le Shen roamed around the roof and trees of the Great Ape Pavilion then moved to a pedestrian path. A veterinarian then sedated Le Shen. During the process of being transferred indoors and regaining consciousness, Le Shen developed an anesthetic complication pulmonary edema, which led to sudden cardiac and respiratory arrest. Despite over four hours of intensive rescue efforts, Le Shen could not be revived and was pronounced dead at 8:40 p.m.

Le Shen was born on May 27, 1999, at Hongshan Forest Zoo. Abandoned by his parents, he became the first orangutan in Eastern China to be hand-reared by humans. His name was chosen by the citizens of Nanjing. Le Shen was the first animal in the zoo to cooperate with keepers for physical check-ups, learning to brush his teeth within an hour. He can also help the zookeeper to pick up litter and clean his enclosure. As of 2020, he was also the first and only orangutan in China known to paint. Later, he even learned to test the electric fence with insulated objects.

==== Pelican "Tutu" ====
On October 31, 2023, Pelican "Tutu" escaped, but it was quickly caught and returned by the staff.

== Features ==
=== Zoo layout ===
Nanjing Hongshan Forest Zoo is divided into three main areas: Xiao Hongshan, Da Hongshan, and Fangniu Mountain. The zoo features a variety of specialized exhibits, including the Giant Panda Pavilion, Great Ape Pavilion, Meerkat Pavilion, Asian Elephant Pavilion, Australia Zone, Wolf Pavilion, Red Panda Pavilion, Monkey Hill, Hornbills Aviary, Tropical Birds Aviary, Crane Garden, Pheasants Garden, Parrots Garden, Primates of Asia Zone, Bears Pavilion, Tigers Pavilion, Giraffe Pavilion, Koala Pavilion, Feline in China Pavilion, Planet of the Feline, Native Wildlife Conservation Area, Lemur Island, Gaoligong Zone, Gondwana Land, Hippopotamus Pavilion, Amphibian and Reptiles Aquarium and Terrarium, Museum of Judicial Protection of Biological Diversity, and Tangjiahe Lives (Under Construction).

=== Animal resources ===
As of November 2024, the zoo houses over 3,000 animals of more than 260 species. The zoo is home to rare animals from around the world, including Asian elephants, giraffes, zebras, kangaroos, white tigers, jaguars, and orangutans, as well as first-class nationally protected species such as giant pandas, golden snub-nosed monkeys, and gibbons. Nanjing Hongshan Forest Zoo is also home to over 100 species of common and rare birds, including Mandarin ducks, pheasant-tailed jacanas and rare reed parrotbills. Other species include egrets, moorhens, black kites, oriental turtle doves, cuckoos, dollarbirds, and grey-capped greenfinches. Among these, the reed parrotbill holds particular significance for Nanjing, as it is a rare bird species endemic to China that depends heavily on large reed beds for habitat. Among these, the reed parrotbill holds particular significance for Nanjing as a rare bird species endemic to China, heavily reliant on large reed beds for habitat, with its first specimen collected in Nanjing as well.

=== Plant resources ===
As of May 2015, the zoo covers an area of 1,026 mu (approximately 68.4 hectares) and is home to over 400 plant species, ranging from ferns to arbor trees, with a forest coverage exceeding 85%. Among them, species like cedar, ginkgo, magnolia, camphor, dawn redwood, and red maple majorly contribute to the zoo's mountainous landscape.

== Exhibits ==
The zoo consists of Xiaohongshan bird region, Dahongshan beast region, Fangniushan herbivore and Primate animal region, and an amphibian and reptile hall. There are 260 species among the more than 3000 animals in the zoo, including as Asian elephants, giraffes, zebras, kangaroos, white tigers, black panthers, orangutans, mandrills, flamingos, macaws, parrots and pythons. The first degree protected species from China in the zoo's collection include giant pandas, golden snub-nosed monkeys, gibbons, red-crowned cranes, South China tigers, and Chinese alligators.

== Awards ==
Time	Awarding Body	Award
February 2010	China Wildlife Conservation Association (CWCA)	National Wildlife Protection Science Popularization Education Base (全国野生动物保护科普教育基地)
May 2010	Nanjing Science Popularization Work Joint Conference Office	Nanjing Science Education Demonstration Base (南京市科普教育示范基地)
2010 - 2012	Jiangsu Provincial Steering Committee for ideological and Ethical Advancement	Civilized Unit in Jiangsu Province (江苏省文明单位)
June 2011	Chinese Association of Zoological Gardens	Exemplary Unit of Zoo Protection Education (动物园保护教育先进单位)
2011 - 2015	Jiangsu Association for Science and Technology (JAST), Jiangsu Provincial Department of Science and Technology, Jiangsu Education Department	Jiangsu Province Science Popularization Education Base (江苏省科普教育基地)
2013	China National Tourist Attractions Quality Evaluation Committee	National 4A Level Tourist Attraction (国家AAAA级旅游景区)
2017	China Association for Science & Technology	National Science Popularization Education Base (全国科普教育基地)
March 2022	China Association for Science & Technology	The First Batch of National Science Popularization Education Bases from 2021 to 2025 (全国科普教育基地名单(2021-2025年第一批))

== Transportation ==
North Gate (Heyan Road Gate): Take Metro Line 1 and get off at the Hongshan Zoo Station or take bus routes 8, 54, 64, 72, 76, 77, 575.

East Gate (Hongshan Road Gate): Take bus routes 40, 74, 501.

Parking: 4 yuan/hour
