= List of administrative divisions of Nanjing =

Nanjing a sub-provincial city and it is divided into 11 districts. Nanjing is further divided into 100 township-level divisions.

== County-level divisions ==
Map	Subdivision		Simplified Chinese	Population (2010)	Area (km^{2})
	1	Xuanwu District	玄武区	651,957	80.97
	2	Qinhuai District	秦淮区	1,007,922	50.36
	3	Jianye District	建邺区	426,999	82.00
	4	Gulou District	鼓楼区	1,271,191	57.62
	5	Yuhuatai District	雨花台区	391,285	131.90
	6	Qixia District	栖霞区	644,503	340.00
	7	Jiangning District	江宁区	1,145,628	1,573.00
	8	Pukou District	浦口区	710,298	913.00
	9	Luhe District	六合区	915,845	1,485.50
	10	Lishui District	溧水区	421,323	983.00
	11	Gaochun District	高淳区	417,729	801.00

== Historical divisions ==
=== ROC (1911-1949) ===
County / City	Present division
Nanjing City 南京市	Xuanwu, Qinhuai, Jianye, Gulou, Yuhuatai, Qixia
Jiangning County, Jiangsu 江寧縣	Jiangning
Jiangpu County, Jiangsu 江浦縣	Pukou
Luhe County, Jiangsu 六合縣	Luhe
Lishui County, Jiangsu 溧水縣	Lishui
Gaochun County, Jiangsu 高淳縣	Gaochun
