= Line 10 (Nanjing Metro) =

Metro line in Nanjing, China

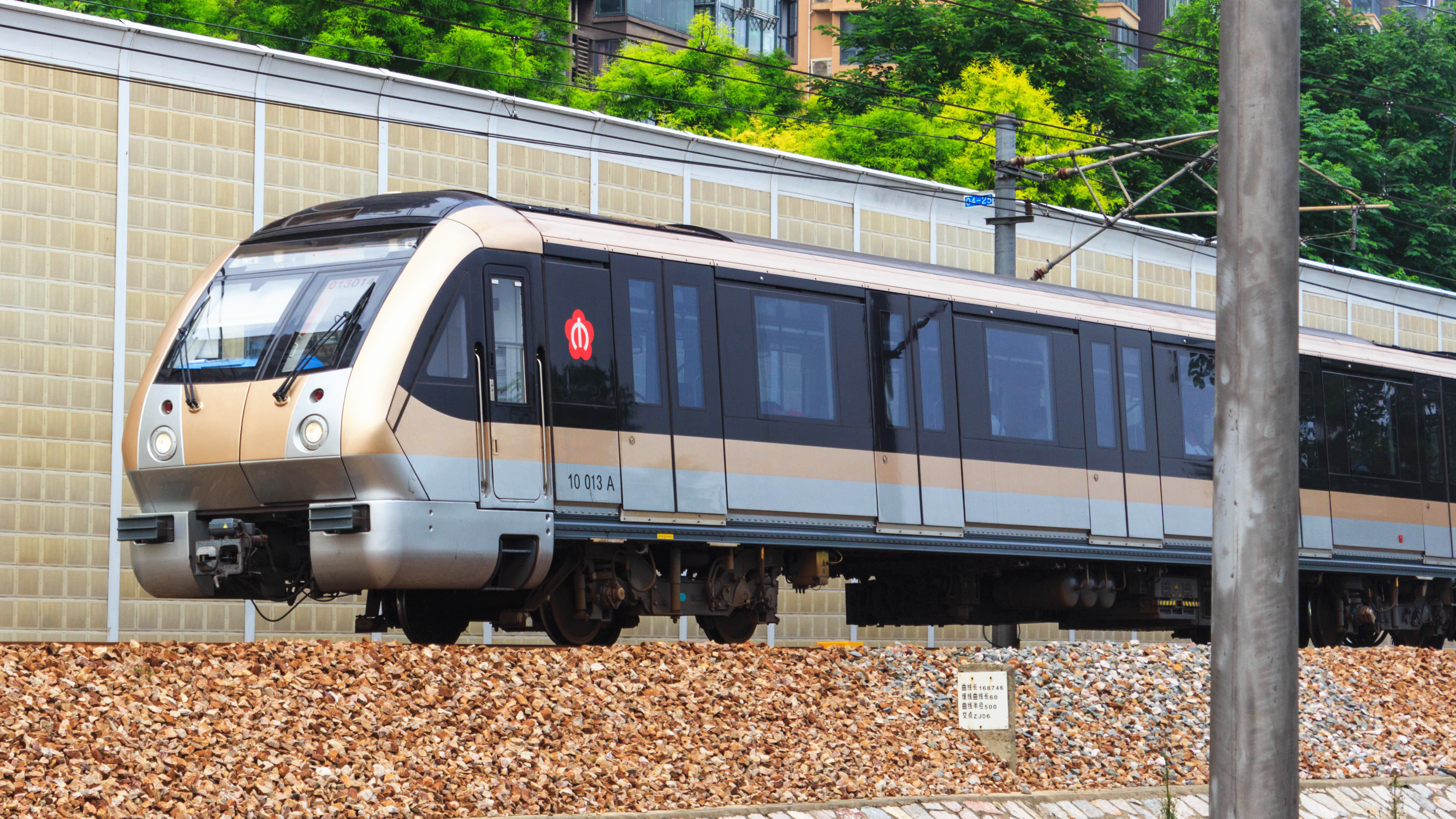

Overview
- Other name: Yushanlu line
- Status: In operation
- Locale: Jiangning, Qinhuai, Yuhuatai, Jianye and Pukou districts Nanjing, Jiangsu
- Termini: Dongqilu; Yushanlu
- Stations: 24

Service
- Type: Rapid transit
- Operator: Nanjing Metro
- Rolling stock: Alstom Metropolis
- Daily ridership: 107,000 (2014 Avg.); 145,000 (2014 Peak)

History
- Opened: July 1, 2014; 12 years ago
- Last extension: 19 December 2025

Technical
- Line length: 34.9 km (21.7 mi)
- Number of tracks: 2
- Character: Underground; Elevated (Xiaohang)
- Track gauge: 1,435 mm (4 ft 8 1/2 in)

Line 10 is an east-west line on the Nanjing Metro system, running from Dongqilu to Yushanlu. Line 10 opened on July 1, 2014 with 14 stations spanning a total of 35.9 km (22.3 mi).

== History ==
The eastern section of Line 10 is the former Line 1 section between Andemen and Olympic Stadium stations. Together with its west extension, it broke away from Line 1 to form a standalone line on July 1, 2014.

Phase 2 of Line 10, from Andemen to Dongqilu, opened on 19 December, 2025.

== Opening timeline ==
Segment	Commencement	Length	Station(s)	Name
Andemen (underground) — Olympic Stadium	1 July 2014	6.7 km (4.16 mi)	5	Line 1 & 10 realignment project
Olympic Stadium — Yushanlu	1 July 2014	14.9 km (9.26 mi)	9	Phase 1
Andemen — Dongqilu	19 December 2025	13.3 km (8.26 mi)	10	Phase 2

== Station list ==
Station name		Connections	Distance km		Location
English	Chinese	Connections	Distance km		Location
Dongqilu	东麒路				Jiangning
Shiyanglu	石杨路	Qilin tram			Jiangning
Yangzhuang	杨庄				Qinhuai
Gaoqiaomen	高桥门				Qinhuai
Chengtiandadao	承天大道				Qinhuai
Dajiaochang	大校场	5			Qinhuai
Jichangpaodaojiuzhi	机场跑道旧址	6			Qinhuai
Kazimen	卡子门	3			Qinhuai
Yuhuatai	雨花台				Yuhuatai
Gongqingtuanlu	共青团路				Yuhuatai
Andemen	安德门	1	0.000	0.000	Yuhuatai
Xiaohang	小行		2.157	2.157	Yuhuatai
Zhongsheng	中胜	7	1.307	3.464	Jianye
Yuantong	元通	2 Hexi tram	1.400	4.864	Jianye
Olympic Stadium	奥体中心		1.865	6.729	Jianye
Mengdudajie	梦都大街		0.848	7.577	Jianye
Lüboyuan	绿博园	9	1.512	9.089	Jianye
Jiangxinzhou	江心洲		1.350	10.439	Jianye
Linjiang / YOGSP	临江·青奥体育公园		4.545	14.984	Pukou
Pukouwanhuicheng	浦口万汇城	11	0.833	15.817	Pukou
Nanjing Tech	南京工业大学		1.134	16.951	Pukou
Longhualu	龙华路		1.427	18.378	Pukou
Wendelu	文德路		1.154	19.532	Pukou
Yushanlu	雨山路		1.729	21.261	Pukou
