= Olympic Stadium station (Nanjing Metro) =

Nanjing Metro station

Coordinates: 32°00′32″N 118°43′03″E

Olympic Stadium 奥体中心
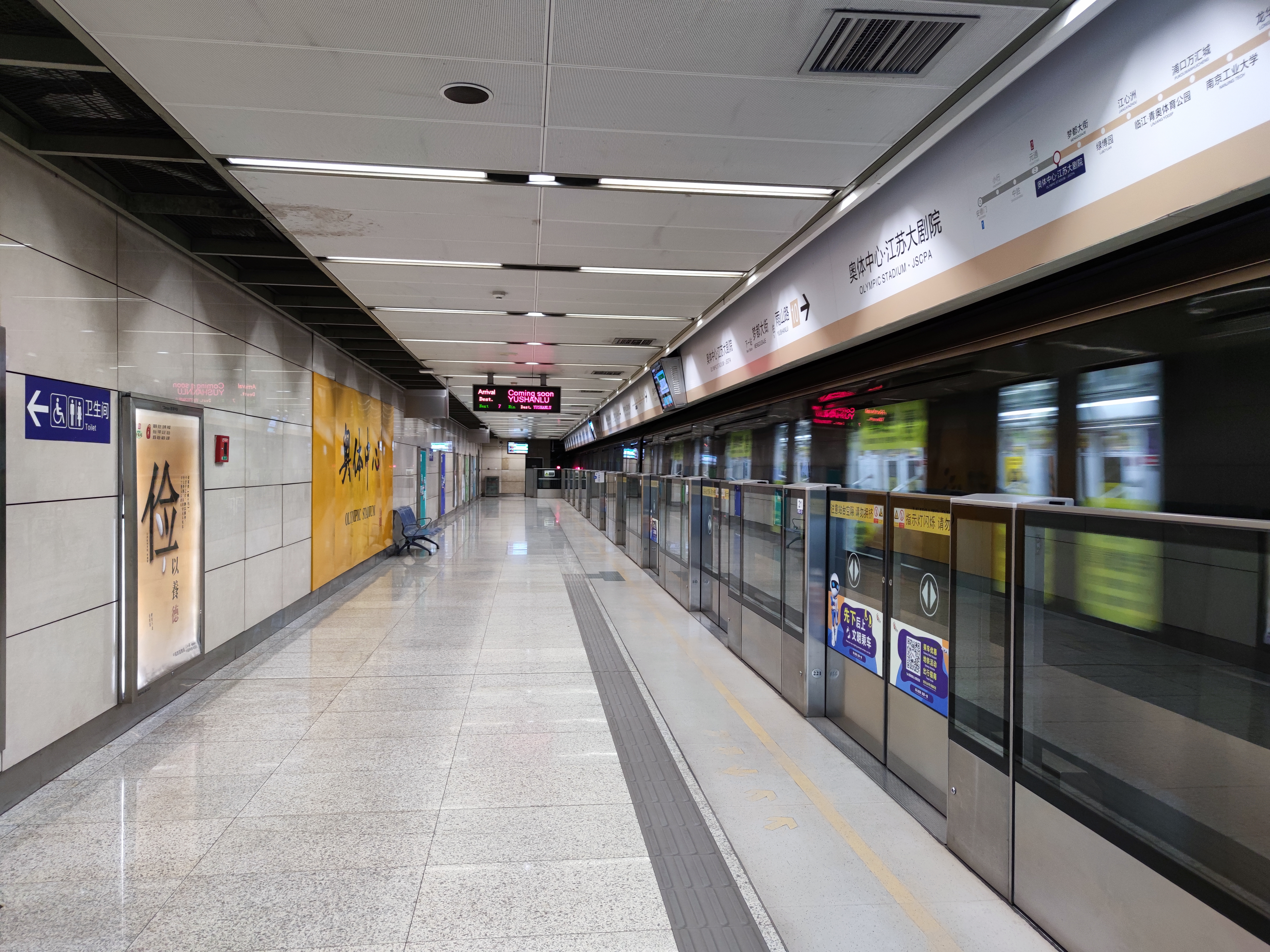

General information
- Location: Jianye District, Nanjing, Jiangsu; China
- Operated by: Nanjing Metro Co. Ltd.
- Line(s): Line 10

Construction
- Structure type: Underground

History
- Opened: 3 September 2005 (as Line 1)

Services
Preceding station	Nanjing Metro	Following station
Yuantong towards Andemen	Line 10	Mengdudajie towards Yushanlu

Olympic Stadium station (simplified Chinese: 奥体中心站; traditional Chinese: 奧體中心站; pinyin: Àotǐ Zhōngxīn Zhàn) is a station of Line 10 of the Nanjing Metro. It started operations on 3 September 2005 as part of Line 1's Phase I that ran from Maigaoqiao to this station, On 1 July 2014, with the opening of Line 10, the former branch of Line 1 from Andemen to this station became re-designated as Line 10.
