= Maigaoqiao station =

Nanjing Metro station

Coordinates: 32°06′11″N 118°48′35″E

Maigaoqiao 迈皋桥
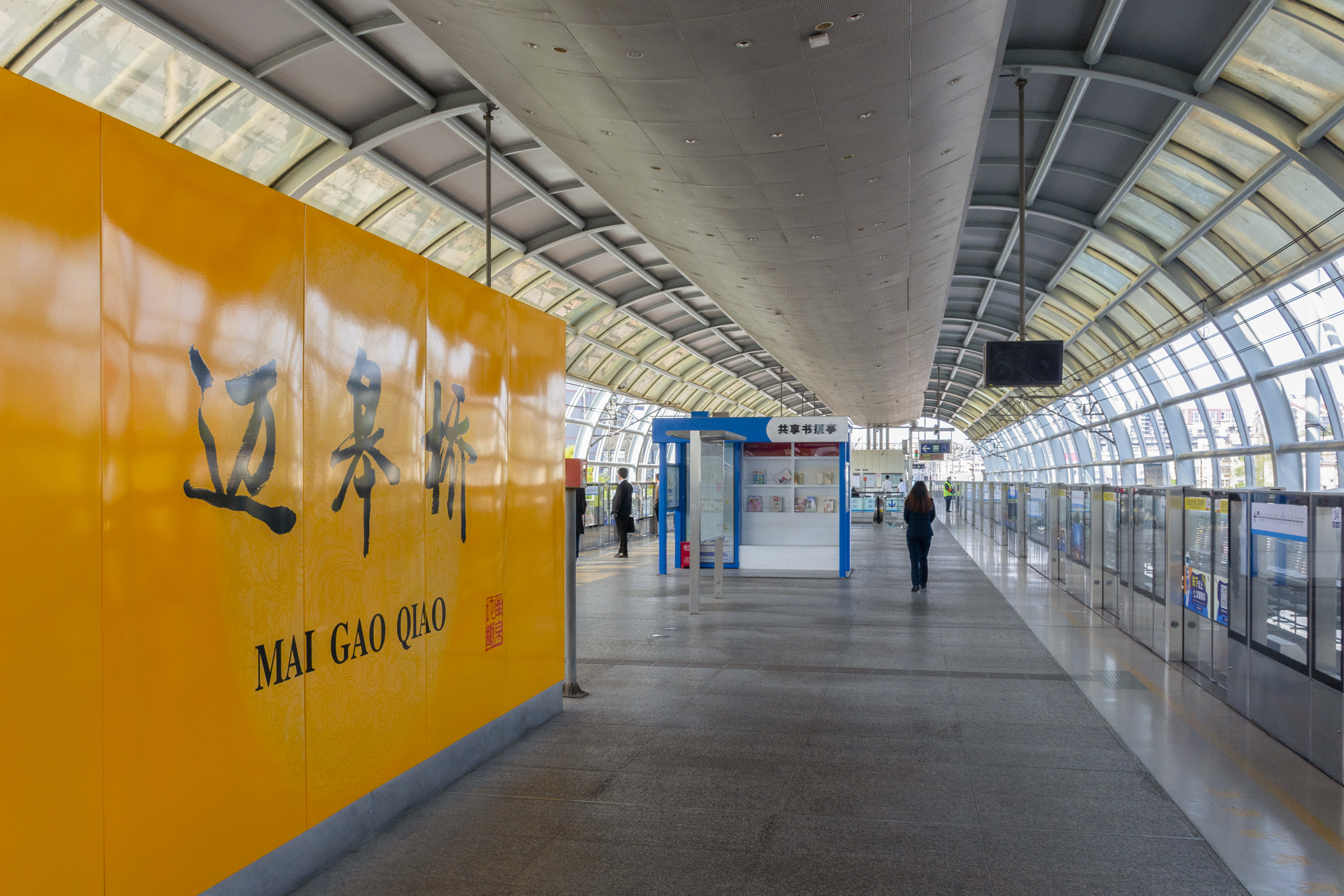

General information
- Location: Hongshan Road (红山路); Maigaoqiao Subdistrict, Qixia District, Nanjing city, Jiangsu Province; China
- Operated by: Nanjing Metro Co. Ltd.
- Line: Line 1
- Platforms: 2

Construction
- Structure type: Elevated

Other information
- Station code: 127

History
- Opened: 3 September 2005

Services
Preceding station	Nanjing Metro	Following station
Xiaozhuang towards Baguazhoudaqiaonan	Line 1	Hongshan Zoo towards CPU
Location

Maigaoqiao station (simplified Chinese: 迈皋桥站; traditional Chinese: 邁皋橋站; pinyin: Màigāoqiáo Zhàn; lit. 'Maigao-Bridge station') located in the city of Nanjing, is an aboveground station of Line 1 of the Nanjing Metro, and was the northern terminus of the line until Baguazhoudaqiaonan Station opened on 28 December 2022. It started operations on 3 September 2005 as part of the line's Phase I from this station to Andemen. (Note: The section from Andemen to Olympic Stadium that initially opened as Line 1 was re-designated as Line 10 when the latter opened in 2014.)

== Physical Dimension ==
Maigaoqiao station is in the north-south direction with a length of 213.189 meters, a width of 19.3 meters, and a height of 16.5 meters. Its total area is 4909 square meters with five exits in total.

== Surroundings ==
Surroundings include a park called Swallow Rock, schools, hospitals, and other institutions. Schools nearby are Maigaoqiao Elementary School, Chengxian Street Elementary School, and College of Education in Nanjing University of Aeronautics and Astronautics. Hospitals consist of Integrated Chinese and Western Hospital of Jiangsu Province. There are government and public institutions around the station as well.
