= Nanjing Metro =

Rapid transit system in Nanjing, China

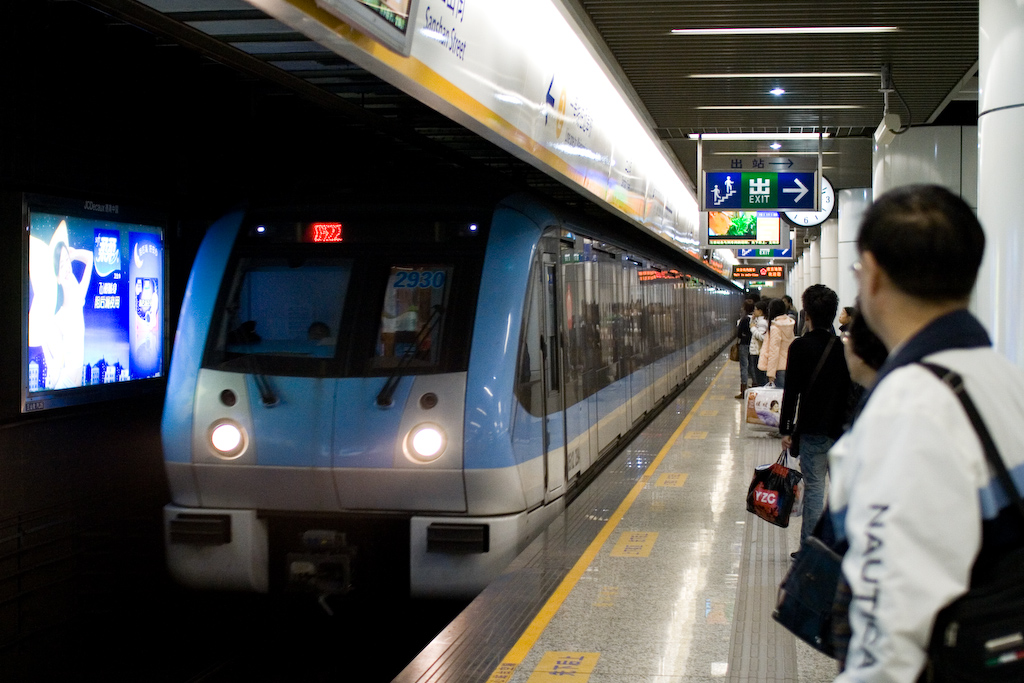
- Line 1 train arriving at Sanshanjie station

Overview
- Native name: 南京地铁
- Locale: Nanjing, Jiangsu
- Transit type: Rapid transit
- Number of lines: 16
- Number of stations: 272^{[a]}
- Daily ridership: 3.106 million (March 2018 avg.); 5.331 million (31 December 2025 peak)
- Annual ridership: 977.4 million (2017)
- Website: njmetro.com.cn

Operation
- Began operation: 3 September 2005; 21 years ago
- Operators: Nanjing Metro Group Co., Ltd. (南京地铁集团有限公司)

Technical
- System length: 658.1 km (408.9 mi)
- Track gauge: 1,435 mm (4 ft 8 1/2 in) standard gauge
- Electrification: 1,500 V DC overhead lines (exclude line S4); 25kV AC overhead lines (line S4)
System map
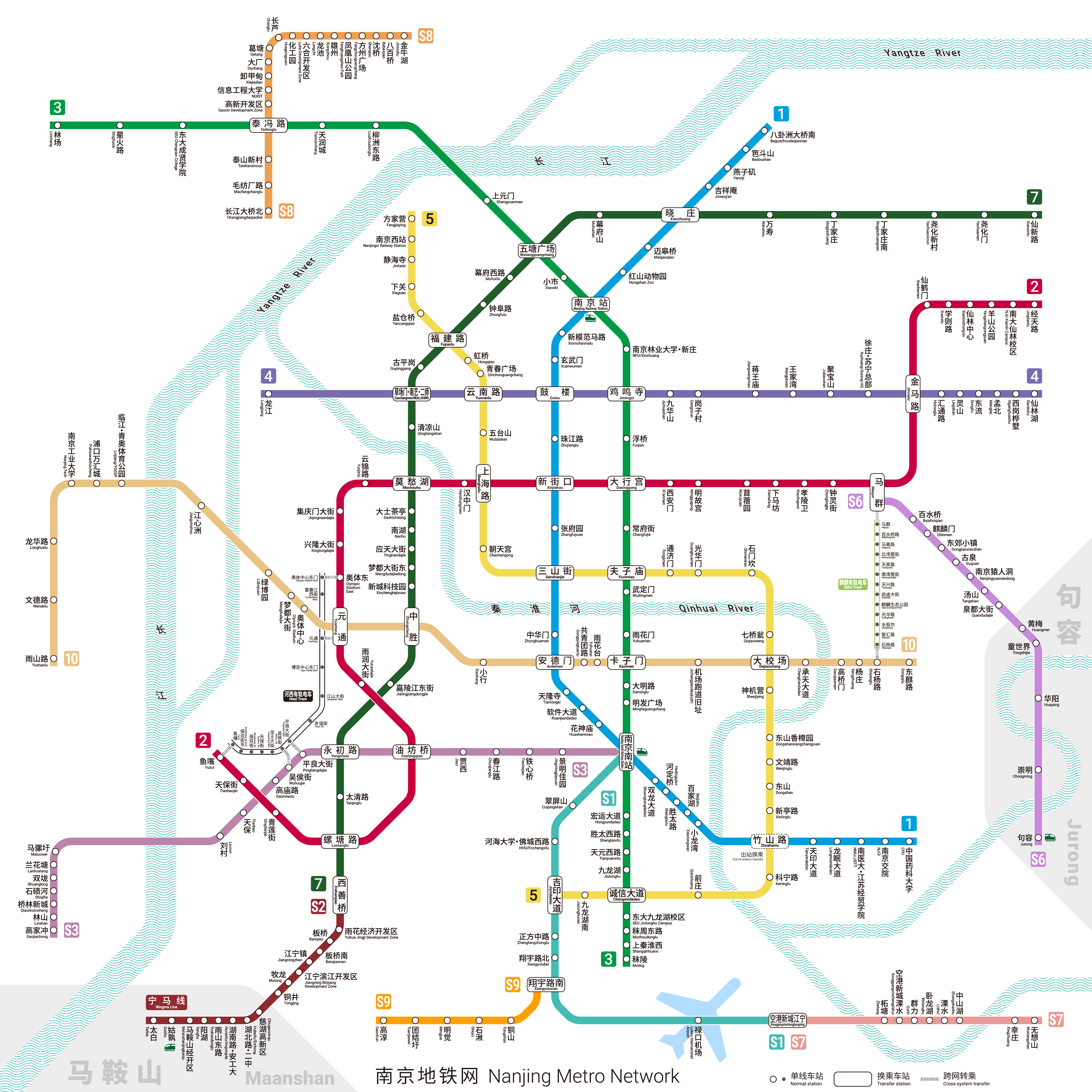

The Nanjing Metro is a rapid transit system serving the urban and suburban districts of Nanjing, the capital city of Jiangsu Province, China.

Proposals for a metro system serving Nanjing first began in 1984, with approval by the State Planning Commission granted in 1994. Construction began on the initial 16-station Line 1 in 1999, and opened in 2005. The system has 16 lines and 272 stations running on 658.1 km (408.9 mi) of track. It is operated and maintained by the Nanjing Metro Group Company. Future expansion plans include 30 lines set to open within the next few years, with several more awaiting approval to begin construction.

== History ==
=== Early proposals ===
In 1984 the first serious proposal for construction of a subway appeared in the Municipal People's Congress. In April 1986, the Nanjing Integrated Transport Planning group was established to research on how to implement a subway system in Nanjing. In December 1986 the team published the "Nanjing Metro Initial Phase". The phase consists of a north–south line, east–west line and a diagonal Northwest to Southeast line. The three lines meet in the city center forming a triangle. A revision of the "Nanjing City Master Plan" in 1993 added another line through the urban core, and three light metro lines connecting Nanjing's suburbs in Pukou and the at time proposed new airport. In addition a suburban railway to Longtan was proposed. A 1999 report on "Nanjing city rapid rail transit network planning" further proposed six subway lines, two subway extensions and three light metro lines.

In 1994, the State Planning Commission approved the preparatory work for the subway only to have the entire metro project postponed in 1995 amid a national freeze on new metro projects.

Major changes were made to "Nanjing Urban Rail Transit Network Planning" in 2003. The new master plan consisted of 13 lines, of which nine are subway lines and four are light metro lines. The new Line 6 will be a loop line connecting all the urban radial lines. The plan retained the original lines 1, 2 and 3 from the previous plan. According to the new plan, the initial phase would consist of the completion of Metro Line 1 and 2 by 2010. Together the two lines will form a basic "cross" network. By 2020 the completion of Lines 1, 2, 3, and 4 was to form a more robust "pound" shaped (#) network. Longer-term plans include the construction of a loop line connecting all existing lines. The plan also identified four subway lines crossing the Yangtze river.

=== First line ===
The initial section of Line 1 from Maigaoqiao to Xiaohang received final official approval in 1999. In May 2000, the Experimental Station resumed construction with the entire Line 1 project in full construction in December.

A western extension of Line 1 from Xiaohang to a newly built stadium was fast tracked after Nanjing won hosting the National Games. Line 1's initial section and the western extension started trial operations on September 3, 2005, running from Maigaoqiao to Olympic Stadium with 16 stations and a total length of 21.72 kilometers (13.50 mi). The opening of the Nanjing Metro Line 1 gave Nanjing the sixth metro system in mainland China after Beijing, Tianjin, Shanghai, Guangzhou and Shenzhen.

=== The Formation of Metro Network ===
Line 2 originated from the east-west line in the early planning stages, designed to connect the eastern Xianlin sub-city and western Hexi sub-city, with a plan to cross the Yangtze River. In December 2003, the construction of Olympic Stadium East station began, followed by the construction of experimental station Xinglongdajie (project name Suojie) started in December 2005. In mid-2006, all 19 stations (from Youfangqiao to Maqun) from phase I started construction officially, with a total length of 25.27 kilometres.

The east extension of Line 2 was approved and commenced in October 2007, adding 5 stations eastward from Maqun station to Yangshangongyuan station, and an additional 2 stations to Jingtianlu station later. However, due to the geological problems and the resulting accident encountered during the construction of Jingqingmendajie station, the original cross-river plan of Line 2, along with the proposed metro ring line (Line 6) were cancelled. The route of Line 2 had been changed to go south to the terminal station Youfangqiao. The new round of network planning and construction of Nanjing Metro was impacted significantly by this change. On May 28, 2010, the phase I and east extension of Line 2 opened simultaneously with 26 stations and a length of 37.80 kilometres from Jingtianlu to Youfangqiao.

The north extension of Line 1 connects main city and Jiangning district. The route starts from the northern side of the main city to the east-north direction to Dongshan, Jiangning via Nanjing South Railway Station. The construction of experimental station Hedingqiao began in November 2006, and the rest of the line started in the following year. The proposed extension included 12 new stations from Andemen to Longmiandadao, covering a distance of 18.01 kilometres. Another extension of this route was added with 3 new stations to the Jiangning university town in May 2008. On May 28, 2010, both the south extension of Line 1 and its own extension project entered service, starting from northern Andemen station to southern China Pharmaceutical University (CPU), bringing the total route length to 25.08 kilometres with 15 stations. The south extension of Line 1 is connected with Line 1, forming a Y-shaped bifurcation.

On May 28, 2010, the total operating mileage of Nanjing Metro increased to 84.75 kilometres after the opening of Line 2 and south extension of Line 1. Line 1, Line 1 south extension and Line 2 formed a cross-shaped network framework, marking Nanjing Metro's entry into the era of networked operations.

== Lines in operation ==
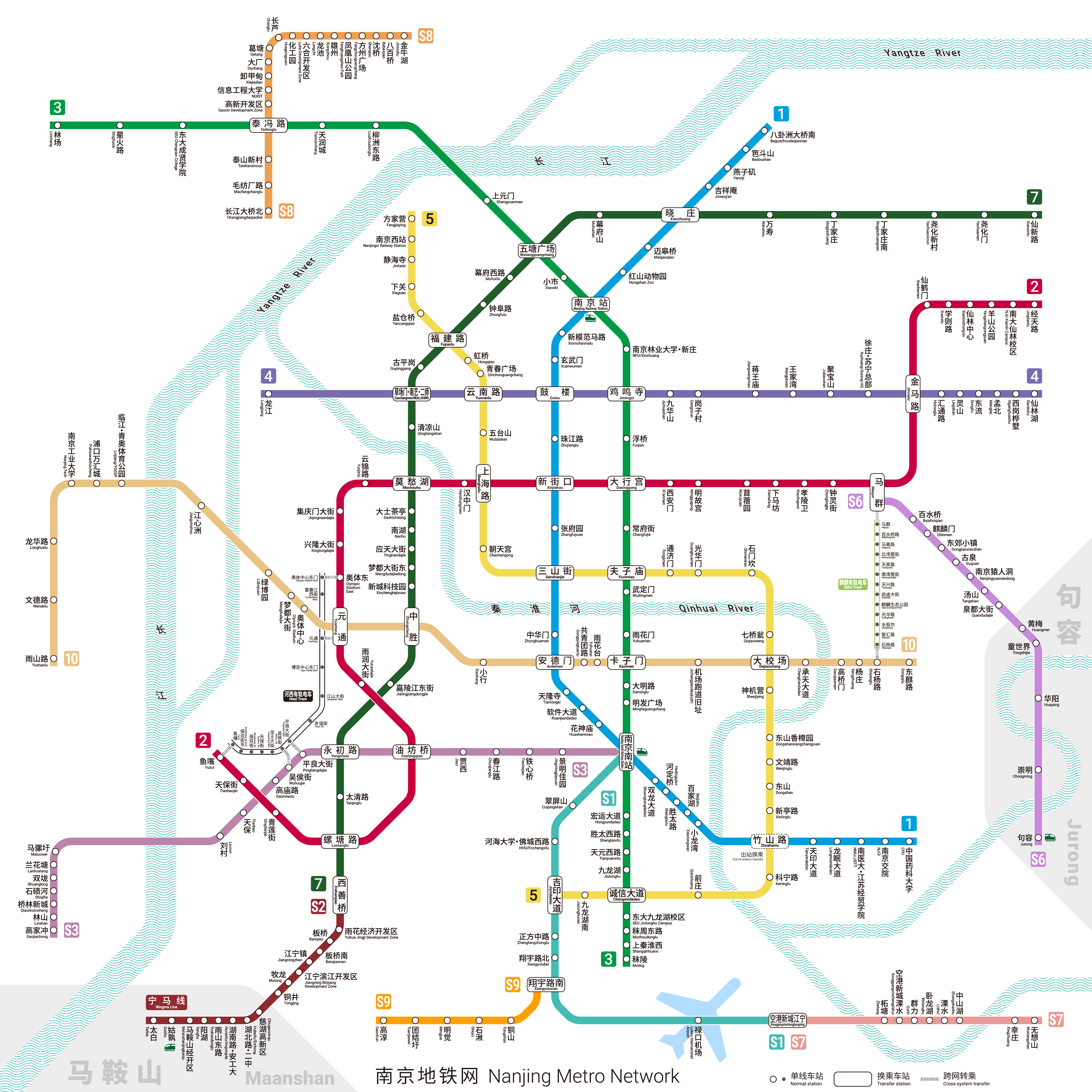
Map of Nanjing Metro (Line S4 is not included).

| Line | Termini (District) | | Opening | Newest extension | Length | Stations |
|---|---|---|---|---|---|---|
| Line 1 (Nanjing Metro) | Baguazhoudaqiaonan (Qixia) | CPU (Jiangning) | 3 September 2005 | 28 December 2022 | 45.4 km (28.2 mi) | 32 |
| Line 2 (Nanjing Metro) | Yuzui (Jianye) | Jingtianlu (Qixia) | 28 May 2010 | 28 December 2021 | 43.6 km (27.1 mi) | 30 |
| Line 3 (Nanjing Metro) | Linchang (Pukou) | Moling (Jiangning) | 1 April 2015 | 19 December 2025 | 48.2 km (30.0 mi) | 31 |
| Line 4 (Nanjing Metro) | Longjiang (Gulou) | Xianlinhu (Qixia) | 18 January 2017 | n/a | 33.8 km (21.0 mi) | 18 |
| Line 5 (Nanjing Metro) | Jiyindadao (Jiangning) | Fangjiaying (Jiangning) | 31 March 2024 | 6 August 2025 | 36.9 km (22.9 mi) | 30 |
| Line 6 (Nanjing Metro) | Qixiashan (Qixia) | Nanjing South Railway Station (Yuhuatai) | 29 September 2026 | n/a | 32.4 km (20.1 mi) | 19 |
| Line 7 (Nanjing Metro) | Xianxinlu (Qixia) | Xishanqiao (Yuhuatai) | 28 December 2022 | 28 December 2024 | 35.7 km (22.2 mi) | 27 |
| Line 10 (Nanjing Metro) | Dongqilu (Jiangning) | Yushanlu (Pukou) | 1 July 2014 | 19 December 2025 | 34.9 km (21.7 mi) | 24 |
| Line S1 (Nanjing Metro) | Nanjing South Railway Station (Yuhuatai) | Konggangxinchengjiangning (Jiangning) | 1 July 2014 | 26 May 2018 | 36.3 km (22.6 mi) | 9 |
| Line S2 (Nanjing Metro) | Xishanqiao (Yuhuatai) | Taibai (Dangtu, Anhui) | 22 April 2026 | n/a | 54.23 km (33.70 mi) | 16 |
| Line S3 (Nanjing Metro) | Nanjing South Railway Station (Yuhuatai) | Gaojiachong (Pukou) | 6 December 2017 | n/a | 36.3 km (22.6 mi) | 19 |
| ( S4 ) | Chahe (Chuzhou) | Chuzhou Railway Station (Chuzhou) | 28 June 2023 | n/a | 46.2 km (28.7 mi) | 10 |
| Line S6 (Nanjing Metro) | Maqun (Qixia) | Jurong (Jurong) | 28 December 2021 | n/a | 43.6 km (27.1 mi) | 13 |
| Line S7 (Nanjing Metro) | Konggangxinchengjiangning (Jiangning) | Wuxiangshan (Lishui) | 26 May 2018 | n/a | 28.8 km (17.9 mi) | 9 |
| Line S8 (Nanjing Metro) | Changjiangdaqiaobei (Pukou) | Jinniuhu (Luhe) | 1 August 2014 | 30 September 2022 | 47.3 km (29.4 mi) | 19 |
| Line S9 (Nanjing Metro) | Xiangyulunan (Jiangning) | Gaochun (Gaochun) | 30 December 2017 | n/a | 52.4 km (32.6 mi) | 6 |
| Total | | | | | 658.1 km (408.9 mi) | 272^{[a]} |

- ^{a} Interchange stations are counted only once.

Evolution of the Nanjing Metro

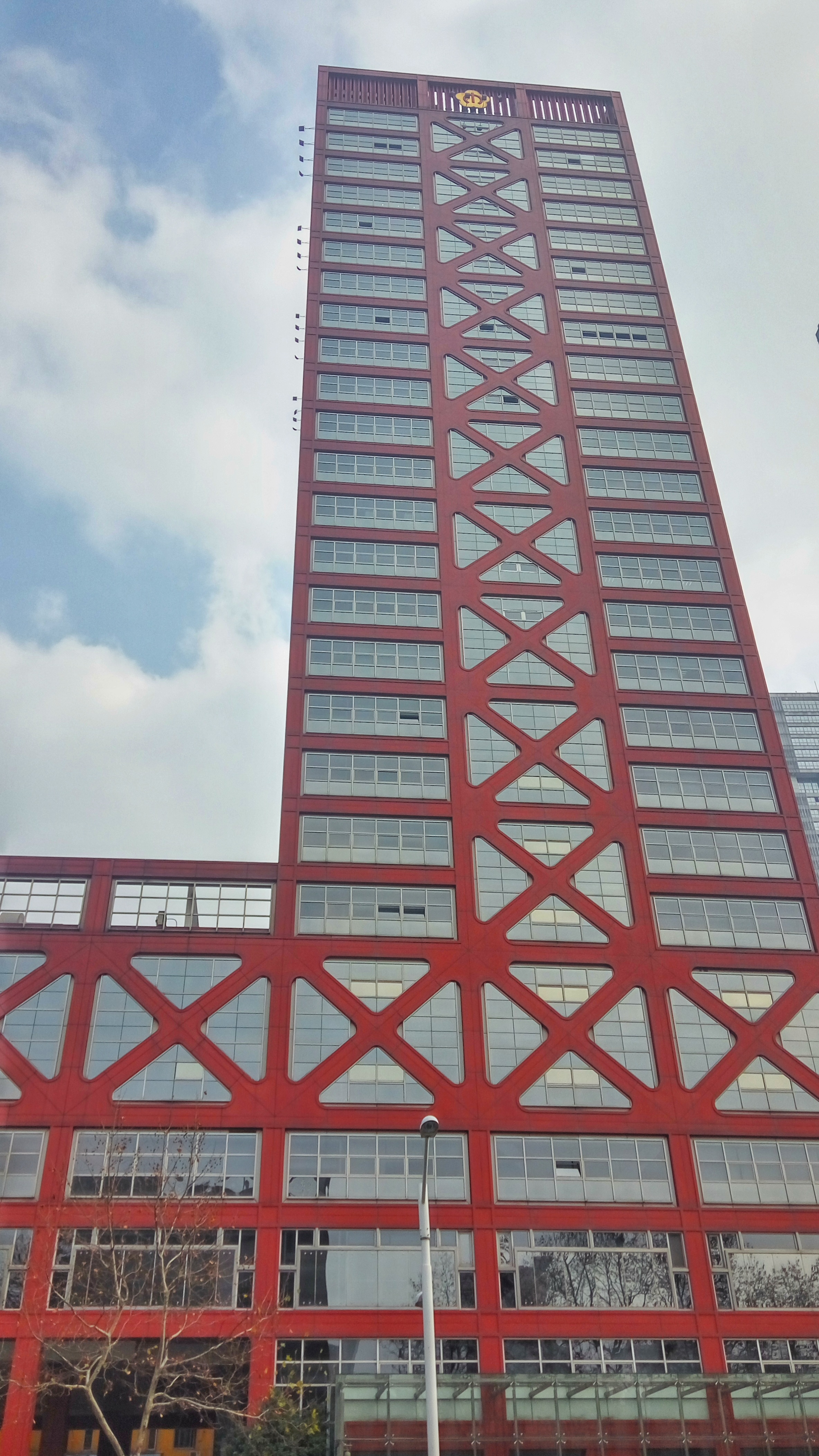
Headquarters for the Nanjing Metro, located on top of exit 3 of the Zhujianglu station.

=== Line 1 ===
Line 1 runs mainly in a north–south direction. The line starts at Maigaoqiao in the north, heading southwards to CPU (China Pharmaceutical University). The construction of Line 1 began in the year 2000 and was inaugurated on September 3, 2005, with 16 stations and a length of 21.72 kilometers (13.50 mi). On May 28, 2010, Line 1's 24.5-kilometer (15.2 mi) long south extension entered into operation. Thus, before the transfer of Line 1's Olympic Stadium Branch to Line 10, Line 1 was 46.2-kilometer (28.7 mi) long with 31 stations. The Olympic Stadium branch line broke away from Line 1 and formed parts of Line 10, when the latter's construction finished and entered operation on July 1, 2014. Currently, Line 1 is 38.9-kilometer (24.2 mi) long with 27 stations. Line 1's color is light blue.

=== Line 2 ===
Line 2 is 43.4-kilometer (27.0 mi) long and has 30 stations. It runs mainly in an east–west direction, from Yuzui in the southwest to Jingtianlu in the northeast. It entered into operation on May 28, 2010. On 28 December 2021, the line was extended west 5.4 kilometers (3.4 mi) with 4 new stations to Yuzui Station. Line 2's color is red.

=== Line 3 ===
Groundbreaking work for Line 3 started in January 2010. This line, with a north–south orientation, started operation on April 1, 2015 and is 44.9 kilometres (27.9 mi) in length with 29 stations. Line 3's color is green.

=== Line 4 ===
Construction of east–west Line 4 begun in late 2012 and the first phase entered operation on January 18, 2017. The completed portion is 33.75 kilometers (20.97 mi) in length. The line is known as A Zi (the Purple) as the branding for the line and the train color is purple, the first of which were delivered in April 2015. The line started operation on January 18, 2017. Line 4's color is purple.

=== Line 5 ===
Line 5 opened its southern section on March 31, 2024 that is 12.9 kilometers long with nine stations. Line 5's color is yellow.

=== Line 6 ===
Line 6 opened on September 29, 2026. It is 32.4-kilometer (20.1 mi) long with 19 stations. It through-operates with Line S1. Line 6's color is teal.

=== Line 7 ===
Line 7 is a northeast–southwest line roughly following the south bank of the Yangtze River. The south section has been under construction since November 2017. The rest of the line started construction in November 2018. The north section from Xianixnlu to Mufuxilu opened on 28 December 2022, the south section from Yingtiandajie to Xishanqiao opened on 28 December 2023, and the central section from Mufuxilu to Yingtiandajie opened on 28 December 2024. This line is also the first line of Nanjing Metro to use trains in GoA4 automated level. Line 7's color is dark green.

=== Line 10 ===
Line 10 is a western extension from Line 1's Olympic Stadium branch line, which broke away from Line 1 and formed part of Line 10 when the new line was completed. Construction started in February 2012, finished in 2014. The line is approximately 21.6-kilometer (13.4 mi) long with 14 stations, and entered operation on July 1, 2014. Line 10's color is beige.

=== Line S1 ===
Line S1 acts as Nanjing's airport express line, connecting Nanjing South Railway Station to Gaochun District via Nanjing Lukou International Airport. The entire line was planned to be 85.8-kilometer (53.3 mi) long with 13 stations. The first phase from Nanjing South to Lukou International Airport started construction on December 27, 2011, and finished in 2014. The first phase opened on July 1, 2014, in time for the Nanjing 2014 Summer Youth Olympics. It is 35.8-kilometer (22.2 mi) long with 8 stations. The second phase extension later became Line S9. Line S1's color is teal.

=== Line S3 ===
Line S3 opened on 6 December 2017. It starts from Nanjing South Railway Station and heads west, crossing the Yangtze River on the cantilever along the edge of Dashengguan Yangtze River bridge together with high-speed rail trains, before terminating at the Gaojiachong station in Qiaolin, southwest of Pukou District. Originally planned as Metro Line 12 or the Ninghe Intercity Rail Line, the route started construction in late 2011. Besides Nanjing South Railway Station in which passengers can transfer to Lines 1, 3, or S1, Youfangqiao station is also a transfer station between Line S3 and Line 2. Phase one is 37.53 kilometers (23.32 mi) long with 19 stations and connects Nanjing South Railway Station to Jiangbei New Area in Pukou. Phase 2 is now still being planned, which might extends further southwest from Phase 1 to Hexian county in the far future. Line S3's color is magenta.

=== Line S4 ===
Line S4 or the Nanjing-Chuzhou Intercity Railway is a 46.2 kilometers (28.7 mi) rapid transit line connecting Nanjing North railway station with neighboring Chuzhou city in Anhui province. The line will feature passing loops at select stations to allow for distinct express and local services. Chuzhou section of the line is opened on 28 June 2023. An extension to Nanjing North railway station is under construction. The Chuzhou section of the line will use the separated "Chuzhou Rail Transit" logo.

=== Line S6 ===
Line S6 or the Nanjing-Jurong Intercity Railway is a 43.7 kilometers (27.2 mi) connecting suburban Nanjing with neighboring Jurong opened on 28 December 2021. It is the first line in Nanjing Metro that reaches other cities, starting at Maqun station, ending at Jurong station. Line S6's color is lilac.

=== Line S7 ===
Line S7 opened on 26 May 2018. It is an extension of Line S1 further southeast, starting at Konggangxinchengjiangning station, ending at Wuxiangshan station in South Lishui District. Some Line S1 trains continue to operate into Line S7. Line S7's color is pink.

=== Line S8 ===
Line S8 is a suburban metro line which connects Luhe District to Pukou District. The line is 45.2 kilometers (28.1 mi) long, 34.1 kilometers (21.2 mi) of the line is elevated. The line features 17 stations including 6 underground stations and 11 elevated ones. It uses B size trains in 4 car sets that are capable of running up to 100 kilometers per hour (62 mph). Construction of the line started on June 21, 2012, and it was officially opened on August 1, 2014. Line S8's color is orange.

=== Line S9 ===
Line S9 starts from Xiangyulunan station, the 6th station from Nanjing South Railway Station on Line S1, and extends further south to Gaochun District for a total length of 52.42 km (32.57 mi). Upon opening on December 30, 2017, Nanjing became the first city in mainland China where every district is accessible by metro. Line S9's color is yellow.

== Future development ==
=== Under-construction projects ===
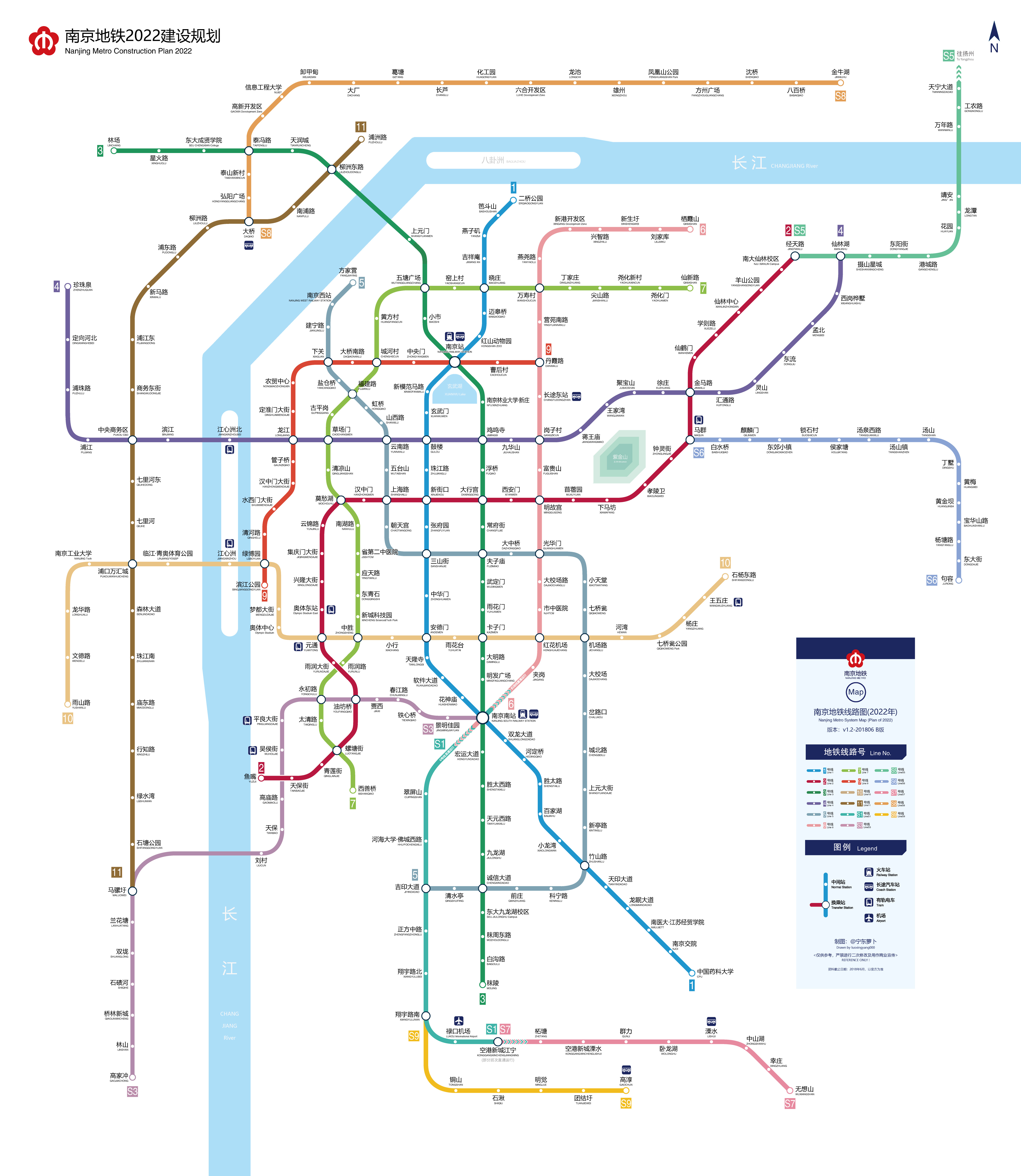
The map above details Nanjing Metro's plans for all lines and stations that were originally planned to enter operation by the end of 2022. Most of these projects have since been delayed.

| Route | Name | Termini | | Planned Opening | Length | Stations | Status | Notes |
|---|---|---|---|---|---|---|---|---|
| 4 | Line 4 (Phase 2) | Longjiang | Zhenzhuquandong | 2028 | 9.7 km | 7 | u/c since February 2021 | |
| 9 | Line 9 (Phase 1) | Hongshanxincheng | JSCPA/Xianfaguangchang | 2027 | 19.67 km | 16 | u/c since March 2020 | |
| 11 | Line 11 (Phase 1) | Puzhoulu | Maluowei | 2028 | 27.0 km | 20 | u/c since November 2021 | |
| S4 | Line S4 Nanjing-Chuzhou Intercity Railway | Nanjing North Railway Station | Chahe | 2028 (Nanjing section) | 8.2 km | 3 | u/c since December 2018 | |
| S5 | Line S5 (Phase 1) | Xianlinhu | Yangzhou Railway Station | 2032 | 57.61 km | 16 | u/c since December 2021 | |

==== Line 9 ====
Line 9 (Phase 1) is a 19.67 kilometers (12.22 mi) have a total of 16 stations, all of which are underground. The symbol of the train is orange red, and the maximum speed is 80 km/h. The route passes through Xuanwu District, Gulou District and Jianye District, and passes through Nanjing Railway Station, Xiaguan, Longjiang, Lüboyuan, Jiangsu Grand Theater and other areas. In the future, it will become an important line within the main city to connect the central Hexi, Xiaguan and Xinzhuang areas. The regional line is of great significance to the development of Hexi New City and the upgrading and reconstruction of the Xiaguan area. Construction started in May 2020, the construction period is about 4 years. The list of stations: Danxialu, Caohouxun, Nanjing Railway Station, Zhongyangmen, Chenghecun, Daqiaonanlu, Xiaguan, Agricultural Trade Centre, Dinghuaimendajie, Longjiang, Guanziqiao, Hanzhongmendajie, Shuiximendajie, Qinghelu, Lüboyuan and Binjianggongyuan. In the southern extension of Phase 3, Line 9 is expected to be extended all the way to Banqiao in the far south west of Nanjing.

=== Proposed projects ===
The Nanjing Metro Phase III construction plan was submitted to the National Development and Reform Commission in 2024. The plan proposed 10 projects which include: 2 new lines, 7 extensions of existing lines and 1 shuttle line totalling 120 km of new metro. The Nanjing Metro Phase III construction plan proposed Line 2 East Extension, 2-9 Shuttle Line, Line 3 Phase IV, Line 4 Phase III West Extension, Line 4 Phase III East Extension, Line 8 Phase I, Line 9 Phase II, Line 10 Phase III, Line 16 and Line S3 East Extension to be constructed.

== Ticket system ==
Fares on the Nanjing Metro are distance-based, the most recent fares adjustment was occurred on 31 March 2019, resulting in the total passenger flow was dramatically dropped. Fares range from 2 yuan (approx US$0.30) for journeys under 4 kilometers, to 15 yuan for longer journeys. There is a 5% discount for users of the Nanjing Public Utility IC Card. Fares can also be paid using Alipay, but with no discount.

=== Single tickets ===
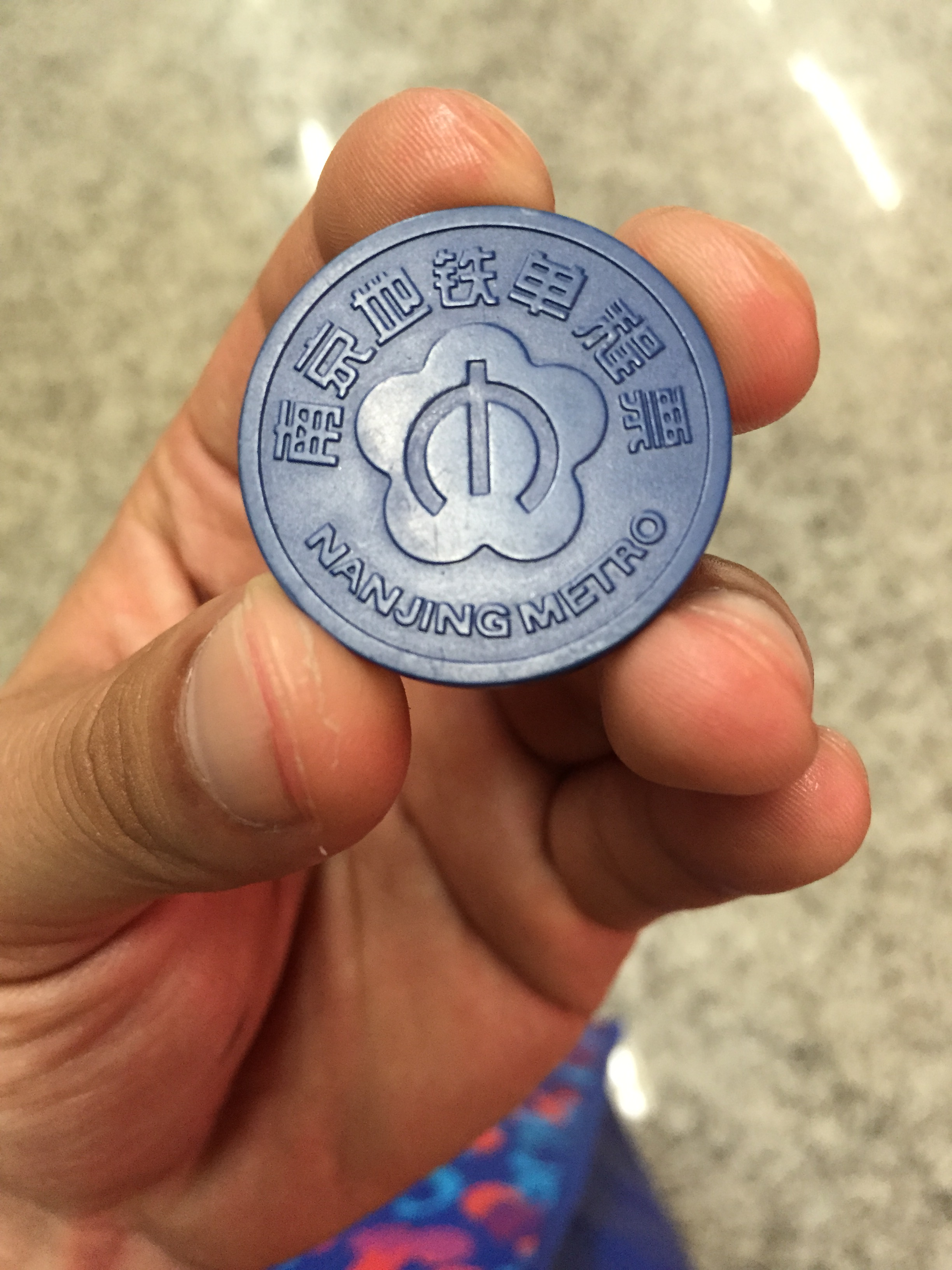
Nanjing Metro Single journey ticket

Single journey tickets can be purchased from the ticket vending machine or at a ticket window. The ticket vending machine accepts both coins, bills (¥5 and ¥10) and Alipay.

=== Transit card ===
Apart from one-way tickets, fares can be paid with the Nanjing Public Utility IC Card, or Jinlingtong (Chinese: 金陵通; pinyin: Jīnlíngtōng). It can be purchased for a refundable fee of 25 yuan (about 3.8 dollars) and refilled at ticket booths inside the metro stations as well as many collaborative convenience stores throughout the city. The card can be used to pay for other means of public transportation, such as the city taxi and the city bus. An NFC version of the card is free of charge by applying from the iPhone's Wallet app.

This transit card is similar to Beijing's Yikatong, and the Octopus card of Hong Kong's MTR.

=== Metro Pass ===
Since April 1, 2025, Nanjing Metro has offered a metro pass with options for a 1-day pass (¥20, approximately US$2.80) and a 3-day pass (¥45, approximately US$6.20). The pass allows unlimited metro rides within the designated time period. Both passes are available for purchase at selected metro stations, including those near tourist attractions, central business districts (CBDs), and major transportation hubs.

== Rolling stock ==
- 882 Alstom Metropolis cars – built by CSR Nanjing Puzhen
- CRRC Nanjing Puzhen CIVAS cars introduced since 2014

== Signalling system ==
For Line 1, Siemens Transportation Systems (TS) was awarded the supply contract in November 2002.

For Line 2, Siemens Transportation Systems (TS) and its local partner Nanjing Research Institute of Electronics Technology (NRIET) have been awarded to supply the signaling system after signing a contract (about 25 million Euro). Technologies used include Trainguard MT, Vicos OC 501, Sicas ECC and Az S 350 U axle counting system.

== See also ==
- List of Nanjing Metro stations
- List of metro systems
- Urban rail transit in China

=== Other Transport in Nanjing ===
- Nanjing trams
