= Nanjing railway station (disambiguation) =

Nanjing railway station (南京站) is one of the two main railway stations of Nanjing, Jiangsu.

Nanjing railway station may also refer to:

- Nanjing railway station (Taiwan) (南靖車站), in Chiayi County, Taiwan
- Nanjing railway station (Fujian) (南靖火车站), in Nanjing County, Fujian

== See also ==
- Nanjing South railway station, the second main station of Nanjing
- Zhonghuamen railway station, formerly known as Nanjing South railway station
- Nanjing West railway station, which has no passenger service now but was of importance before the construction of the Yangtze River Bridge
- Nanjing North railway station
