= Xinjiekou =

Xinjiekou may refer to the following locations in China:

- Xinjiekou, Beijing, area in Xicheng District, Beijing
- Xinjiekou Station (Beijing), subway station serving the area of the same name in Beijing.
- Xinjiekou, Nanjing, street in Nanjing
- Xinjiekou Station (Nanjing), subway station serving the street of the same name in Nanjing.
