= Qingchunguangchang station =

Metro station in Nanjing, China

Qingchunguangchang 青春广场
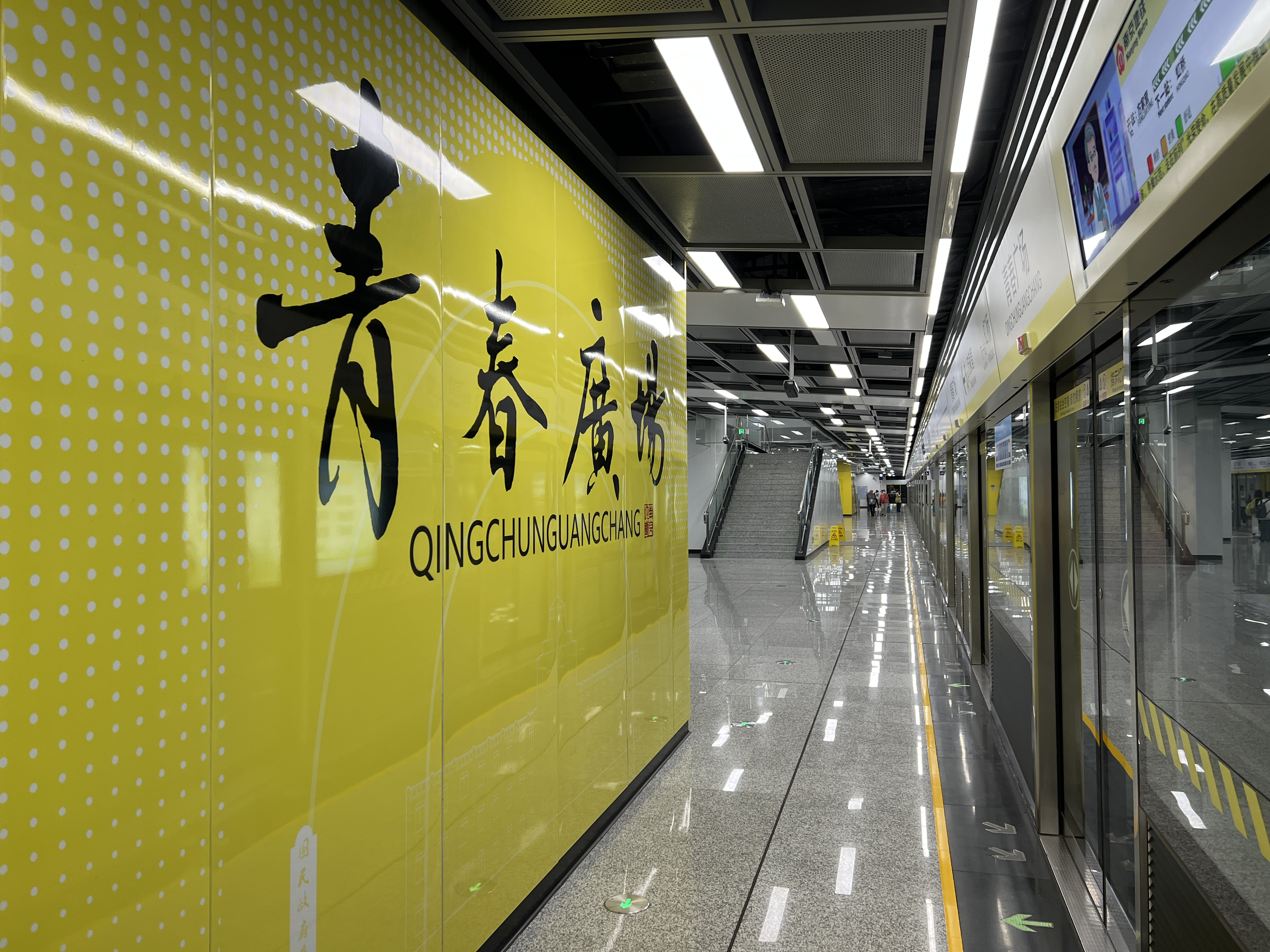
- Qingchunguangchang station platform (August 2025)

General information
- Location: Intersection of Zhongshan North Road, Hunan Road, and Shanxi Road; At the junction of Ninghai Road Subdistrict and Hunan Road Subdistrict; Gulou District, Nanjing City, Jiangsu Province; China
- Operated by: Nanjing Metro
- Line: Line 5

Construction
- Structure type: Underground

History
- Opened: 6 August 2025 (Line 5)

Services
Preceding station	Nanjing Metro	Following station
Hongqiao towards Fangjiaying	Line 5	Yunnanlu towards Jiyindadao
Location

Qingchunguangchang Station is located at the intersection of Zhongshan North Road, Hunan Road, and Shanxi Road in Gulou District, Nanjing City, Jiangsu Province, China, it is a subway station on Nanjing Metro Line 5, which opened on August 6, 2025.

== Platform Structure ==
Qingchunguangchang Station (Chinese: 青春广场站) is a two-level underground island platform station. The first basement level houses the concourse, while the second basement level accommodates the platforms. The total building area is approximately 17,244.1 square meters. The station spans 515 meters in length with 12-meter-wide platforms. A single siding is located behind the station. The main structure's standard section width is 21.1 meters, with the excavation pit reaching a depth of approximately 16.6 meters at the central mileage point.

== Platform Design ==
The design of Qingchunguangchang Station incorporates the concept of “youth,” featuring a Mondrian-inspired ceiling palette with vibrant oil-painting hues like yellow and blue to evoke a lively and energetic atmosphere. Art installations adorn the station concourse walls and structural columns, employing artistic techniques such as collage, feature extraction, and deconstruction-reconstruction. These works depict portraits of women spanning from the late Qing Dynasty to modern times, using diverse artistic scenes to illustrate temporal shifts and reflect transformations in social history and culture.
