= Jinghaisi station =

Nanjing Metro Line 5 Stations

Jinghaisi 静海寺
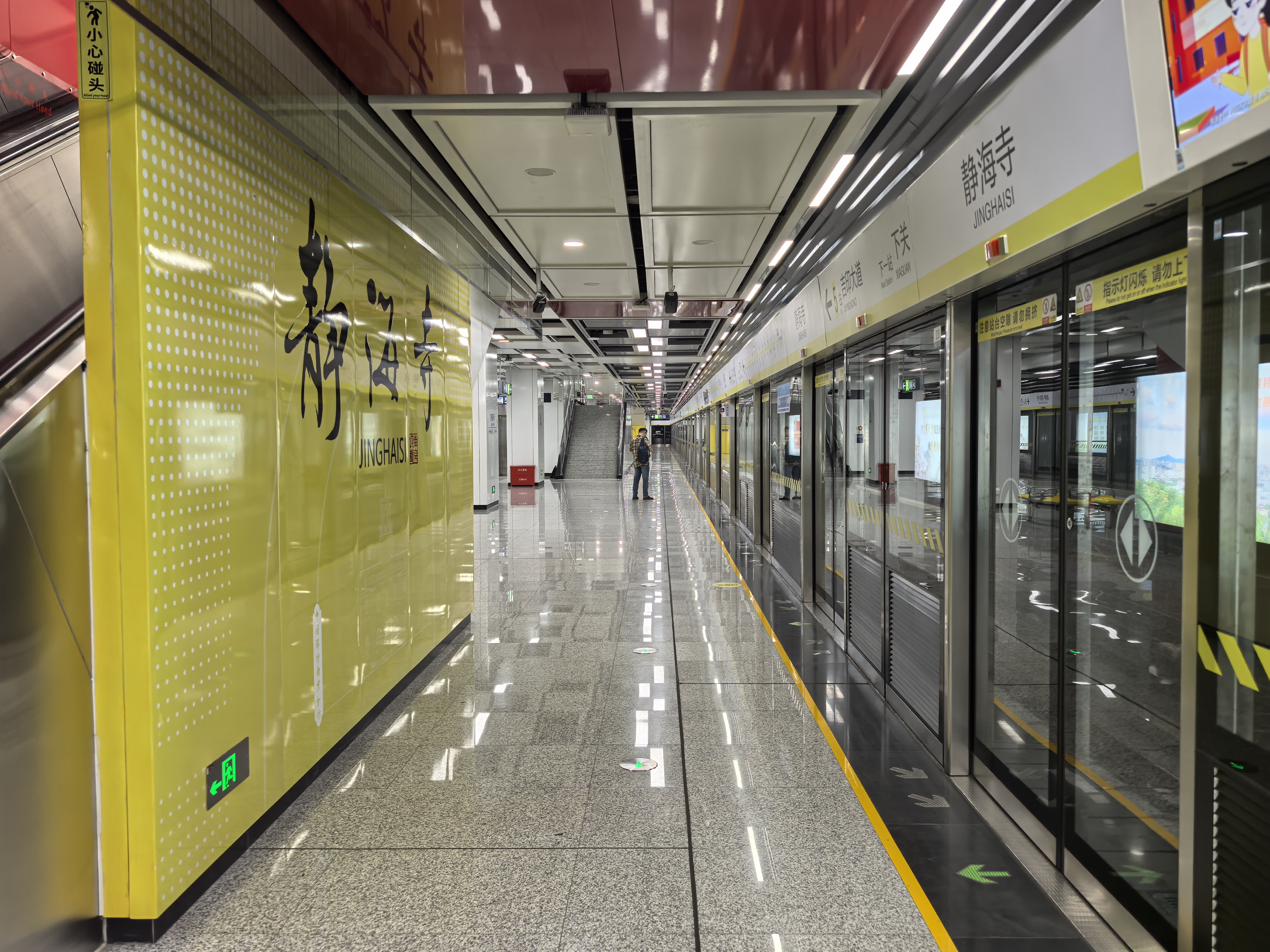
- Jinghaisi station platform (August 2025)

General information
- Location: The intersection of Jianning Road and Xiaguan Street; Xiaguan Subdistrict, Gulou, Nanjing, Jiangsu; China
- Operator: Nanjing Metro Co. Ltd.
- Line: Line 5

Construction
- Structure type: Underground

History
- Opened: 6, August 2025

Services
| Preceding station | Nanjing Metro | Following station |
|---|---|---|
| Nanjingxi Railway Station towards Fangjiaying | Line 5 | Xiaguan towards Jiyindadao |
Location

Jinghaisi station is located at the intersection of Jianning Road and Xiaguan Avenue in Xiaguan Subdistrict, Gulou District, Nanjing City, Jiangsu Province, People's Republic of China. It is a metro station on Nanjing Metro Line 5. It started operations on August 6, 2025.

== Station Structure ==
The station features a two-level underground island platform.

== Surroundings ==
- Jinghai Temple
- Yangtze River Nanjing Waterway Bureau Wharf
- Xiaguan History Exhibition Hall
- Former site of the Capital Power Plant of the Republic of China
- Nanjing Tianfei Palace Primary School
