= Shanghailu station =

Nanjing Metro station

Coordinates: 32°02′32″N 118°46′34″E

Shanghailu 上海路
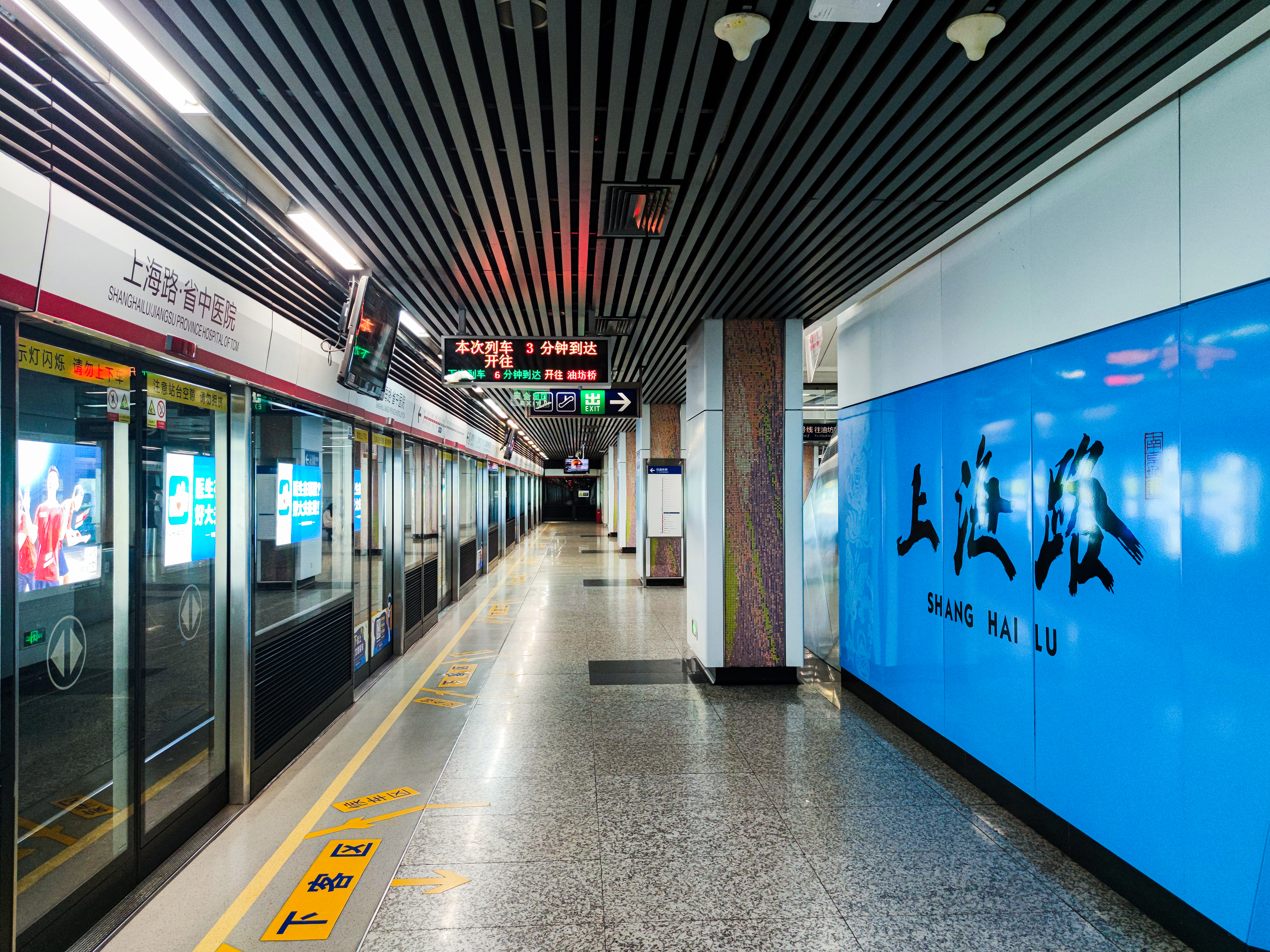
- Line 2 platform

General information
- Location: Hanzhong Road and Shanghai Road; Gulou District / Qinhuai District border, Nanjing, Jiangsu; China
- Operated by: Nanjing Metro Co. Ltd.
- Lines: Line 2; Line 5

Construction
- Structure type: Underground

Other information
- Station code: 214

History
- Opened: 28 May 2010 (Line 2); 6 August 2025 (Line 5)

Services
Preceding station	Nanjing Metro	Following station
Hanzhongmen towards Yuzui	Line 2	Xinjiekou towards Jingtianlu
Wutaishan towards Fangjiaying	Line 5	Chaotiangong towards Jiyindadao
Location

Shanghailu station (Chinese: 上海路站; pinyin: Shànghǎilù Zhàn) is a station of Line 2 of the Nanjing Metro, and an interchange station with the Line 5. It started operations on 28 May 2010 along with the rest of Line 2.
