= Jinling Hotel =

Hotel in Nanjing, Jiangsu, China

Coordinates: 32°02′39″N 118°46′37″E

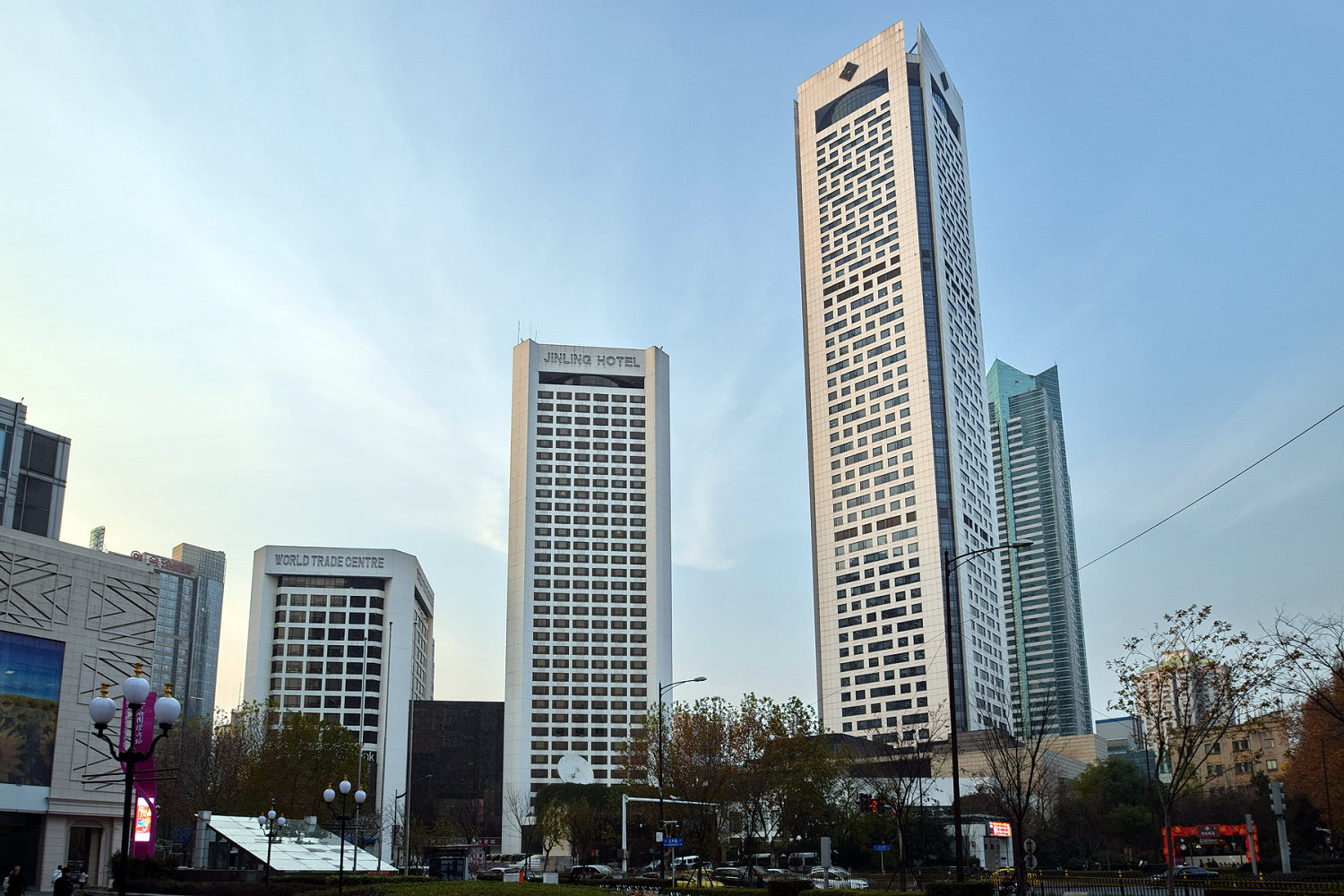
- Jinling Hotel, Nanjing
- Interactive map of the Jinling Hotel area

General information
- Status: open
- Location: 2 Hanzhong Road, Nanjing, People's Republic of China
- Opened: March 1983
- Cost: 85$/night
- Owner: Jinling Holdings Ltd

Technical details
- Floor count: 37

Design and construction
- Architects: P&T

Other information
- Number of rooms: 585

Website
- http://www.jinlinghotel.com/English/index.aspx

Jinling Hotel Nanjing (simplified Chinese: 金陵饭店; traditional Chinese: 金陵飯店; pinyin: Jīnlíng Fàndiàn) is a hotel in Nanjing, China, located near the city's Xinjiekou district. "Jinling" is an old name for Nanjing which is often used to refer to the city in a poetic context. The hotel was Nanjing's first modern hotel managed by Chinese and is still often regarded as the pre-eminent five-star hotel in Nanjing. Jinling Hotel was the highest building in China until 1985, while Baiyun Hotel in Guangzhou built earlier was taller if including its antenna. The hotel also has nine restaurants of differing cuisine types. The Jinling Hotel Nanjing involves in many businesses such as chain fast food restaurants, travel agency services, car rental, communications, and advertising.

Jinling Hotel was designed by Palmer & Turner Group, P&T, an architectural firm in Hong Kong. P&T company designed Jinling Hotel's I, II, III phase building and Asia Pacific Tower.

== Overview ==
=== Location ===
Jinling Hotel is located on Hanzhong Road, Xinjiekou district, Jiangsu, China. Xinjiekou is located in the central of Nanjing and a famous commercial center with over 100 years of history. Jinling hotel is located on the northeastern part of Xinjiekou district.

=== Environment and Social Responsibility ===
Jinling Hotel Nanjing Company vigorously carries out environmental protection activities and advocates green consumption and green living. The hotel also spent 16,000 square meters on lawns and ornamental tree planting.

=== History ===
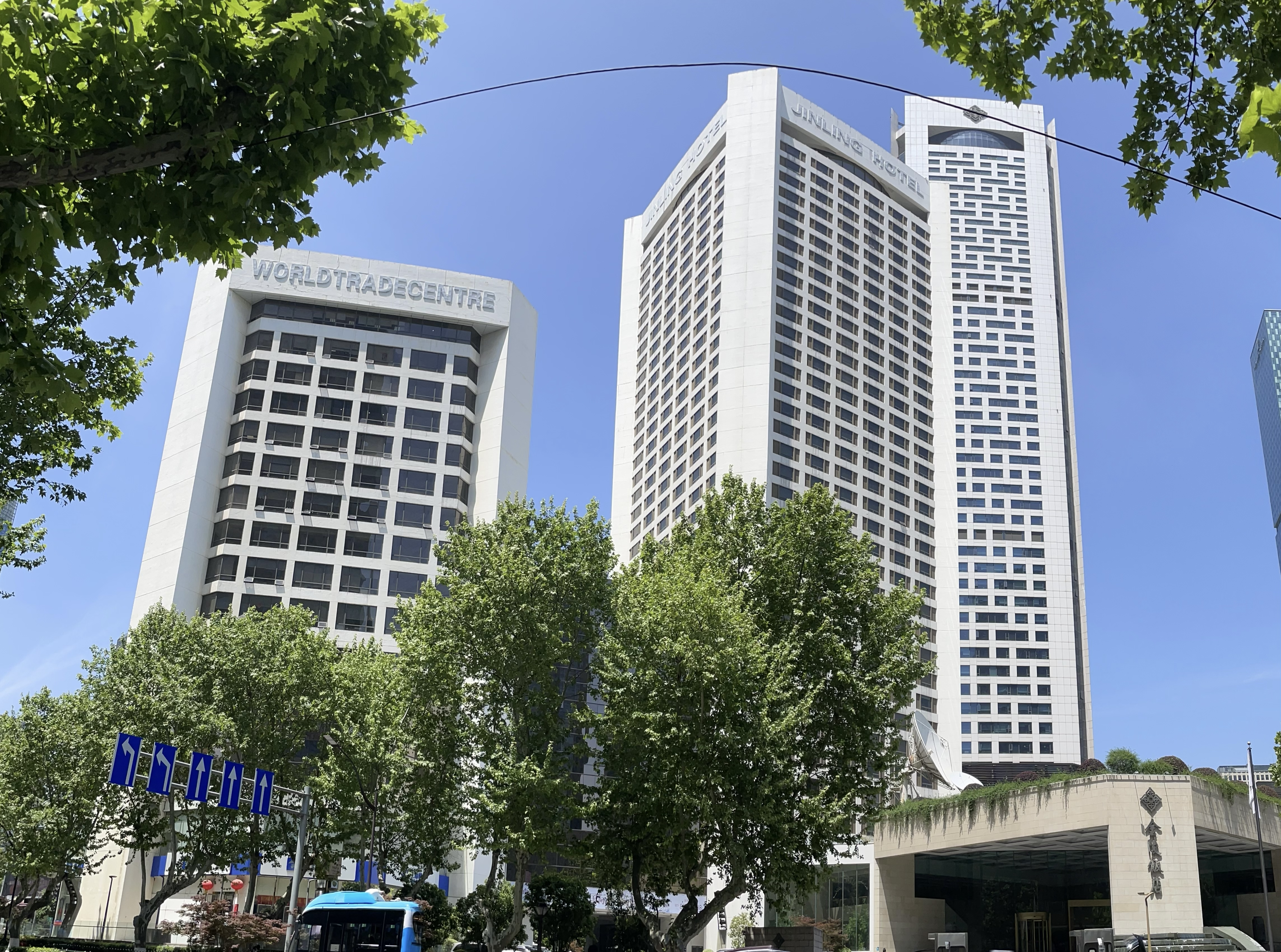
Jinling Hotel Nanjing in 2022, World Trade Center (left), Jinling Hotel (center), and Asia Pacific Tower (right)

In 1978, Singaporean Chinese entrepreneur Tao Xinbo wants to build an international standard hotel in his hometown Nanjing catering oversea tourists. Under Tao Xinbo's effort, Jinling hotel become one of the six largest hotels catering foreign tourists approved by the State Council in 1979. In March 1979, Jinling hotel began its construction and Tao Xinbo invited architect James Kinoshita as designer. After 4 years construction, Jinling Hotel was successfully established on 21 February 1983, and located in the central business district of Nanjing. Jinling Hotel was also the first luxury five-start hotel in Jiangsu Province. Ever since open, JInling Hotel was popular and served hundreds of celebrities and politicians from different countries.

In 1983, the Jinling hotel was the tallest building in China at 110 meters and 37 floors tall. Jinling hotel has created many firsts. It has the first high-speed elevator in China, the first high-rise revolving restaurant in China, and China's first high-rise helipad. Ever since the Jinling hotel's establishment, many foreign media made lots of reports on the construction and opening of Jinling Hotel, including Canada, Britain, and Hong Kong. International media designate Jinling Hotel as the "window of China's reform and opening up". At that time, Jinling Hotel was a mystery to Nanjing residents. The average price for a night was $90, and the only way for residents to know about Jinling Hotel was to buy tickets to visit the high-rise revolving restaurant, Xuan Gong. Jinling Hotel paid off its capital construction debts of US$45 million in only 10 years.

In May 1997, Jinling Hotel Phase II, the Nanjing World Trade Center was completed and started operation. The Nanjing World Trade Canter was 17 floors tall.

In October 2013, Jinling Hotel Phase III, the main building of Asia Pacific Tower was completed. Thus, Jinling Hotel Nanjing became the largest hotel complex in Jiangsu Province. The Asia Pacific Tower has a total of 53 floors and a height of 243 meters.

== Awards ==
- "Model Water Saving Hotel" Award
- in January 2011, won "Best Civilized Unit in Jiangsu Province" Award as the only winner among the hotel industry enterprises.
- In 2019, Jinling Hotel was listed as one of the "20 best hotels to travel" by Money News.
- In September 2021, the Jinling Hotel Corporation won China Quality Awards the highest recognition.

== Notable events ==
- Since establishment in 1983, Jinling Hotel was the tallest building in Nanjing for 10 years.
- In February 1985, Jinli Supermarket, the first supermarket in Nanjing, was open.
- In December 1985, Chinese President Li Xiannian stayed at the Jinling Hotel Nanjing.
- In February 1985, the Chairman of the Central Military Commission Deng Xiaoping inspected the Jinling Hotel Nanjing. To open an outlet for Nanjing to the world and increase movement between China mainland and Hong Kong, Deng Xiaoping made arrangements to open a Hong Kong -Nanjing chartered flight.
- In January 1986, Hong Kong Restaurant LiuChaoChun opened.
- In January 1988, the Jinling Hotel Shopping Center was open. Jinling Hotel Shopping Center was the first upscale shopping center in Nanjing.
- In October 1991, the General Secretary of the Chinese Communist Party Jiang Zemin made his first visit to the Jinling Hotel Nanjing.
- In February 1993, Vice Premier of the People's Republic of China Zou Jiahua stayed at the Jinling Hotel Nanjing.
- In September 1999, the Vice Chairman of Chinese People's Political Consultative Conference Huo Yingdong stayed at the Jinling Hotel Nanjing.
- In October 1999, Vice Premier of the State Council Wu Bangguo stayed at the Jinling Hotel Nanjing.
- In February 2003, Chinese leader Jiang Zemin stayed at the Jinling Hotel Nanjing for the second time and met with Cuba’s leader Fidel Castro.
- In December 2002, Jinling Hotel Corporation was founded as part of Jinling Holdings.
