= Pukou railway station =

Railway station in Nanjing, China

Coordinates: 32°5′55″N 118°42′56″E

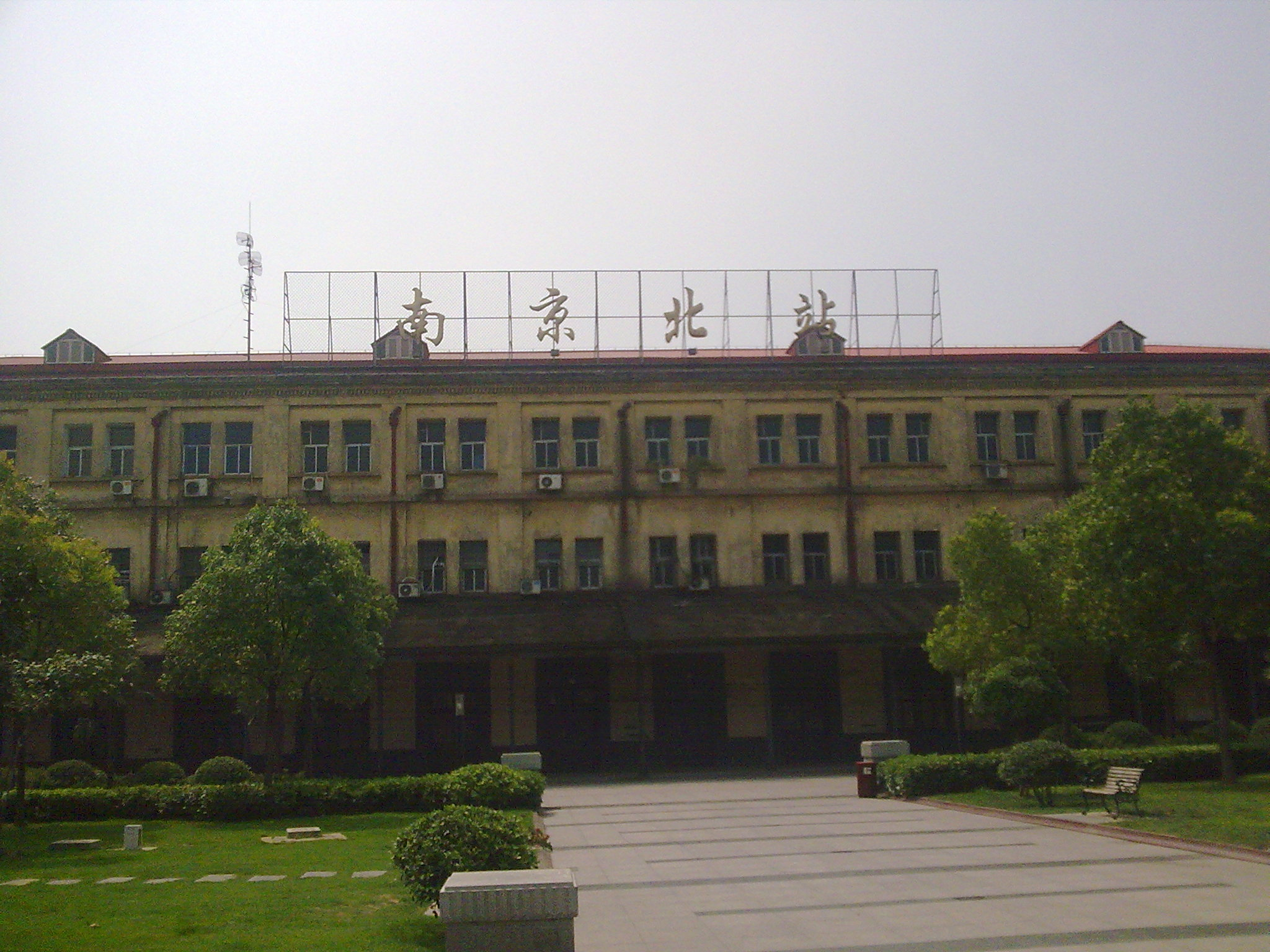
Nanjing North railway station

Pukou railway station (Chinese: 浦口站) formerly known as Nanjing North railway station (Chinese: 南京北站) is a railway station in Nanjing's Pukou District which was built in 1914. Located near the northern shore of the Yangtze River, it was a busy station because people had to get off the train and cross Yangtze River by ferry, and to resume their journey from the Nanjing West railway station on the southern bank of the river.

== History ==
The station opened in 1914 and was called Pukou railway station. It was a terminus, from which a ferry took passengers to Nanjing. After the completion of the Nanjing Yangtze River Bridge in October 1968, the ferry service was discontinued and the station closed. Passenger services resumed in May 1985, but were discontinued again in October 2004. At some point the station was also renamed Nanjing North. The adjacent freight yard and docks remain in operation.

== See also ==
- Nanjing railway station
- Zhonghuamen railway station
- Nanjing West railway station
- Nanjing South railway station
