= Line 5 (Nanjing Metro) =

Metro line in Nanjing, China

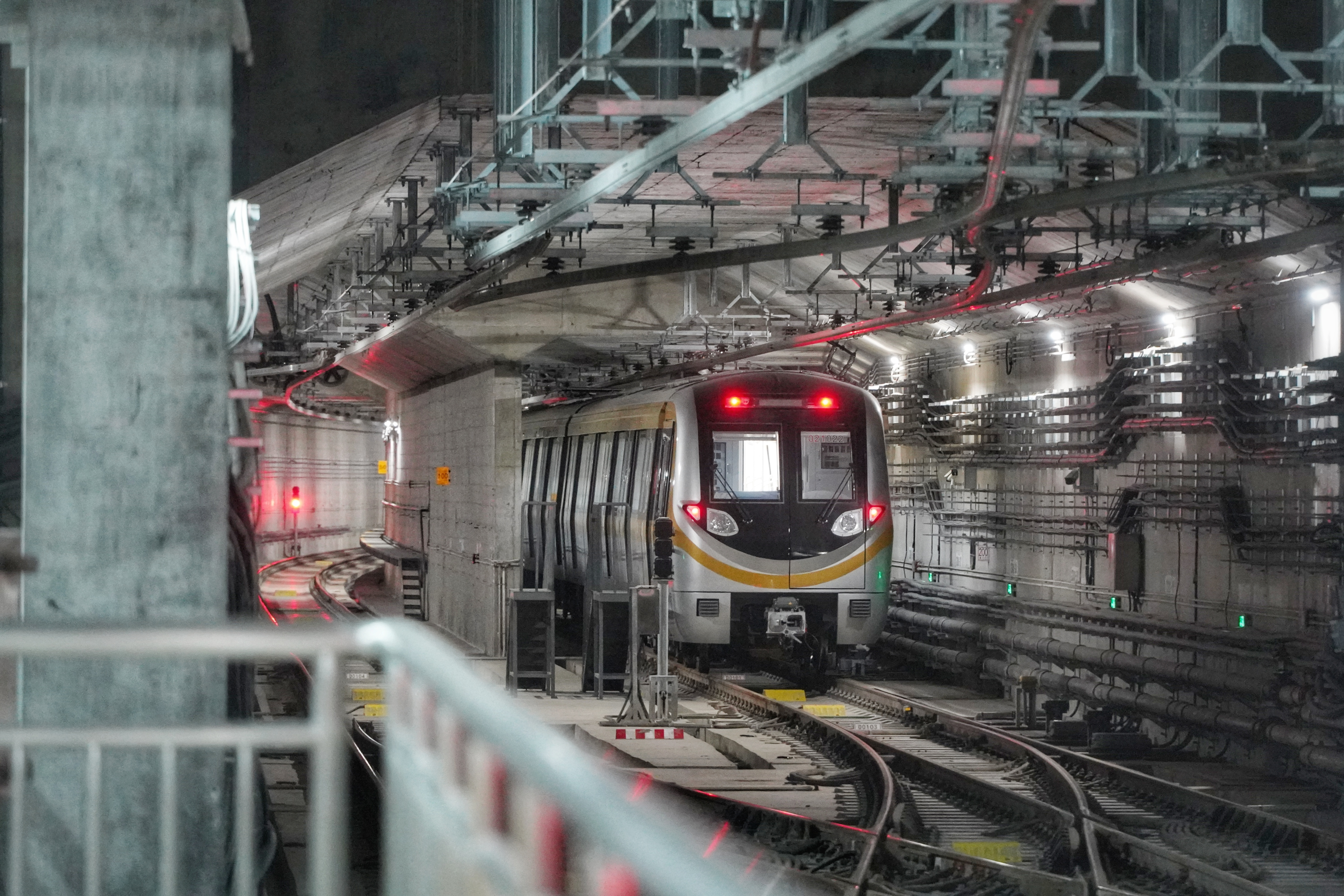

Overview
- Status: In operation
- Locale: Jiangning, Gulou and Qinhuai districts Nanjing, Jiangsu
- Termini: Fangjiaying; Jiyindadao
- Stations: 30

Service
- Type: Rapid transit

History
- Opened: 31 March 2024; 2 years ago

Technical
- Line length: 36.9 km (22.9 mi) (in operation)
- Number of tracks: 2
- Character: Underground
- Track gauge: 1,435 mm (4 ft 8 1/2 in)
- Operating speed: 80 km/h (Maximum)

Line 5 is a northwest–southeast line in Nanjing Metro. The line color is yellow, and it was first opened on March 31, 2024.

Due to track construction works, line 5 suspended its operation since 1 January 2025, and resumed on 12 March.

== Opening timeline ==
Segment	Commencement	Length	Station(s)	Name
Wenjinglu — Jiyindadao	31 March 2024	12.9 km (8.0 mi)	9	South section (Jiangning Section)
Wenjinglu — Fangjiaying	6 August 2025	24 km (14.91 mi)	21	North section

== Stations ==

Station name		Connections	Distance km		Location
English	Chinese	Connections	Distance km		Location
Jiyindadao	吉印大道	S1	0.000	-	Jiangning
Jiulonghunan	九龙湖南		1.768	1.768	Jiangning
Chengxindadao	诚信大道	3	4.863	3.095	Jiangning
Qianzhuang	前庄		6.060	1.197	Jiangning
Keninglu	科宁路		8.485	2.425	Jiangning
Zhushanlu	竹山路	1 (Note: Virtual transfer with line 1 – For passengers transfer within 30 minutes after exiting with a Passenger Code or a Public Transit Card, continuous billing is adopted; Passengers with token need to transfer just by putting the ticket into recycling port and afterwards repurchase a ticket; Passengers with UnionPay Quick Pass Card headed by 62 or Mobile Pay can transfer just by tapping in again after exiting.)	9.431	0.946	Jiangning
Xintinglu	新亭路		10.615	1.184	Jiangning
Dongshan	东山		11.800	1.185	Jiangning
Wenjinglu	文靖路		12.44	0.640	Jiangning
Dongshanxiangzhangyuan	东山香樟园		14.313	1.060	Jiangning
Shenjiying	神机营		17.047	2.734	Qinhuai
Dajiaochang	大校场	10	17.98	0.933	Qinhuai
Qiqiaoweng	七桥瓮		19.276	1.296	Qinhuai
Shimenkan	石门坎		20.207	0.931	Qinhuai
Guanghuamen	光华门	6	21.758	1.551	Qinhuai
Tongjimen	通济门		22.755	0.997	Qinhuai
Fuzimiao	夫子庙	3	24.124	1.369	Qinhuai
Sanshanjie	三山街	1	24.887	0.763	Qinhuai
Chaotiangong	朝天宫		26.626	1.739	Qinhuai
Shanghailu	上海路	2	27.539	0.913	Gulou / Qinhuai
Wutaishan	五台山		28.591	1.052	Gulou
Yunnanlu	云南路	4	29.665	1.074	Gulou
Qingchunguangchang	青春广场		30.739	1.074	Gulou
Hongqiao	虹桥		31.766	1.027	Gulou
Fujianlu	福建路	7	32.474	0.708	Gulou
Yancangqiao	盐仓桥		33.625	1.151	Gulou
Xiaguan	下关	9	34.513	0.888	Gulou
Jinghaisi	静海寺		35.257	0.744	Gulou
Nanjingxi Railway Station	南京西站		35.891	0.634	Gulou
Fangjiaying	方家营		36.9	1.009	Gulou
