= Nanjing West railway station =

Railway station in Nanjing, China

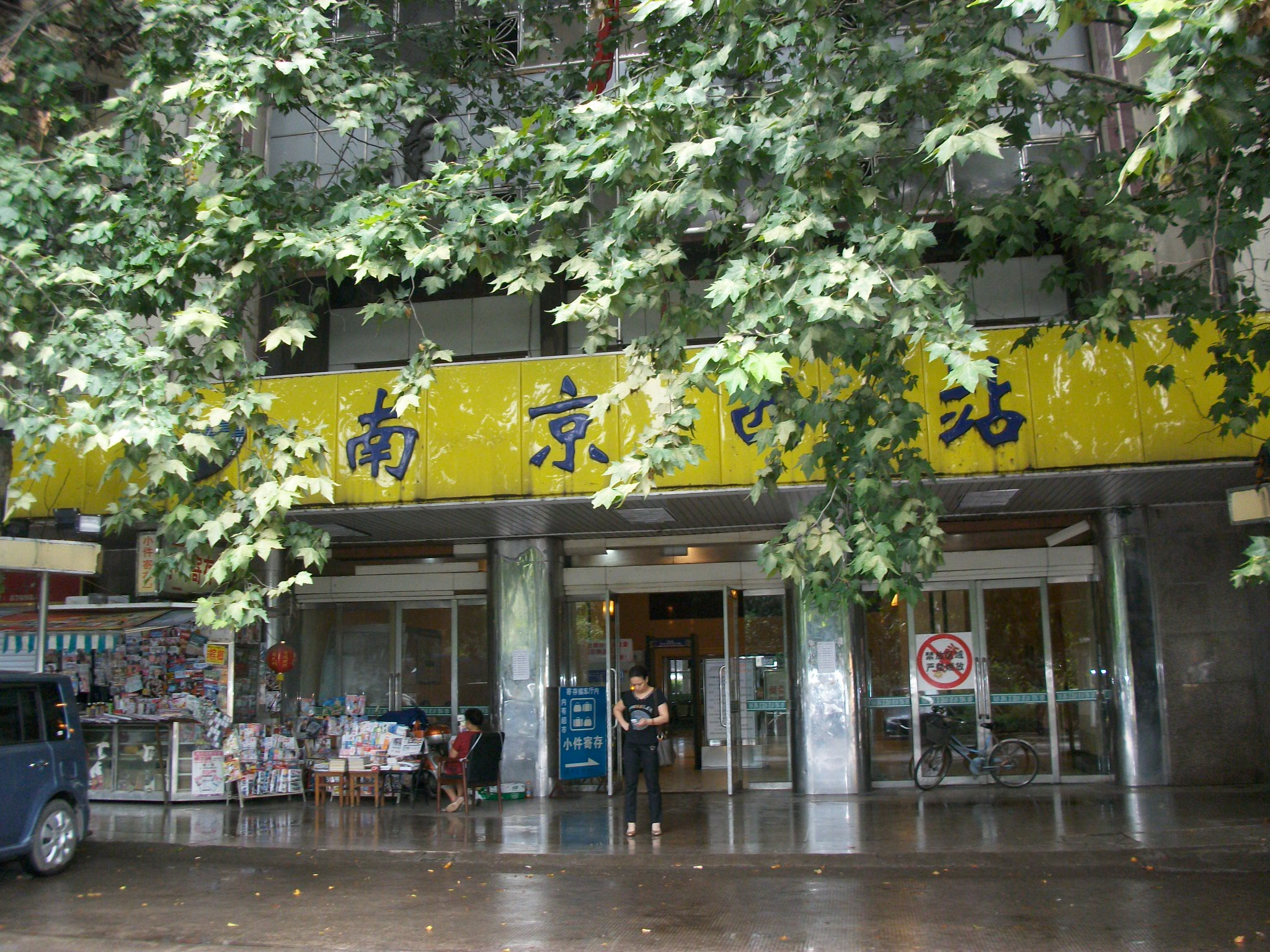
Nanjing West Railway Station

Nanjing West railway station (Chinese: 南京西站; pinyin: Nánjīngxī zhàn) is a railway station in Nanjing, China. Originally named Nanjing railway station, it was first opened in 1908. as the end point of the Shanghai–Nanjing Railway (a section of the Beijing–Shanghai Railway). Later, it also became the starting point of the Nanjing–Tongling Railway.

Located in Nanjing's Xiaguan District, near the southern bank of the Yangtze River, opposite Nanjing North railway station on the northern side of the river (in Pukou), the station was a point where passengers traveling e.g. from Shanghai to Beijing would have to get off the train and board a river ferry, to resume their northward journey from the other station.

After Nanjing Yangtze River Bridge was built, a new Nanjing railway station was constructed closer to the city center, and the original Nanjing railway station near the river was renamed to Nanjing West railway station, which name it has retained to this day.

By the 21st century, the Nanjing West station saw only a few trains a day. This station suspended passenger services 25 March 2012, and will be converted to a railway museum.

== Metro station ==
Nanjingxi Railway Station 南京西站
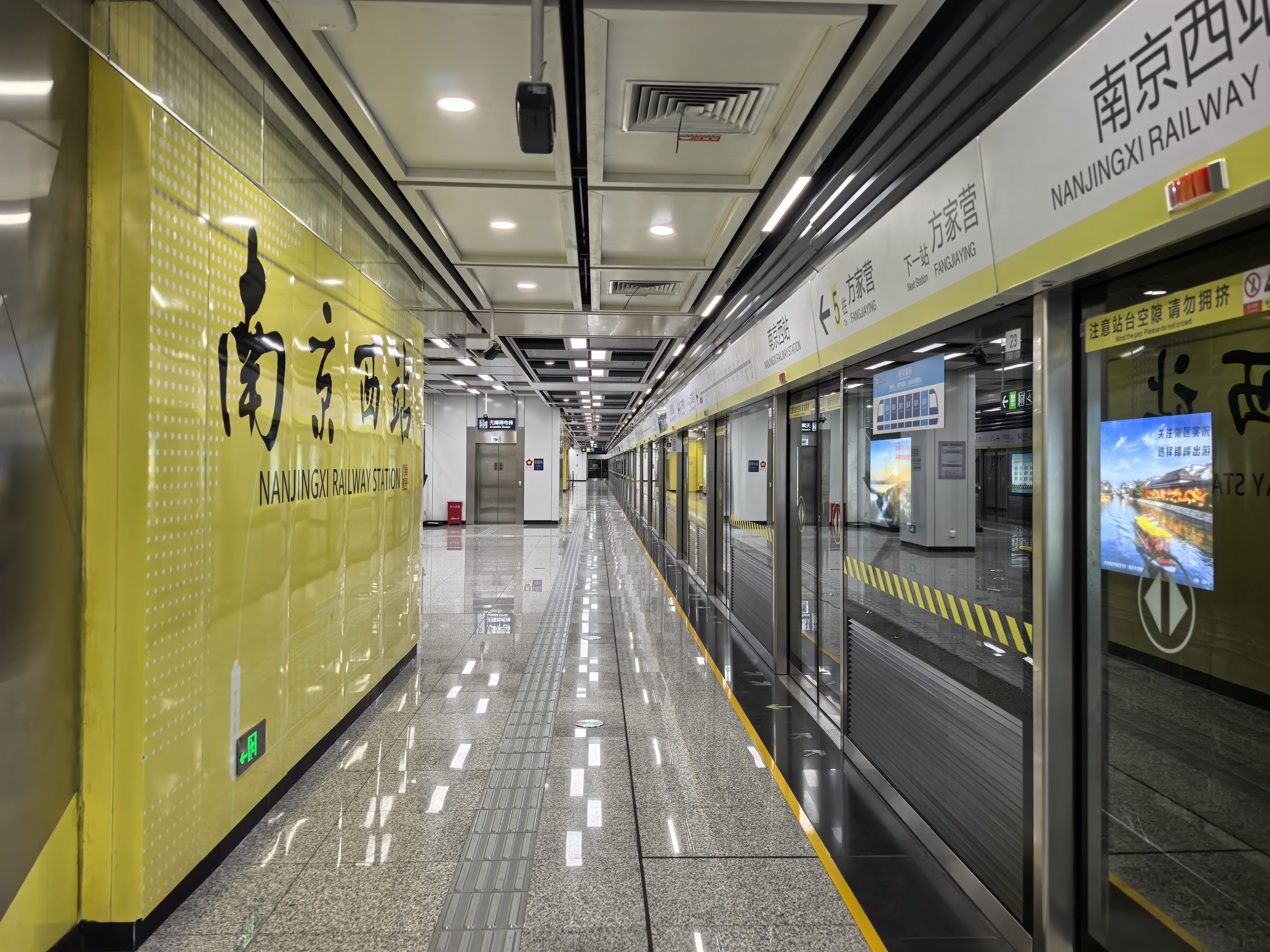

General information
- Location: Gulou District, Nanjing, Jiangsu; China
- Coordinates: 32°05′50″N 118°44′12″E
- Operated by: Nanjing Metro Co. Ltd.
- Line: Line 5

Construction
- Structure type: Underground

History
- Opened: 6 August 2025

Services
Preceding station	Nanjing Metro	Following station
Fangjiaying Terminus	Line 5	Jinghaisi towards Jiyindadao
Location

A metro station on Nanjing Metro Line 5 (North section) is located near the railway museum of Nanjing West railway station. The metro station is translated as Nanjingxi Railway Station on official maps of Nanjing Metro. The metro station opened on 6 August 2025.

== Photos ==
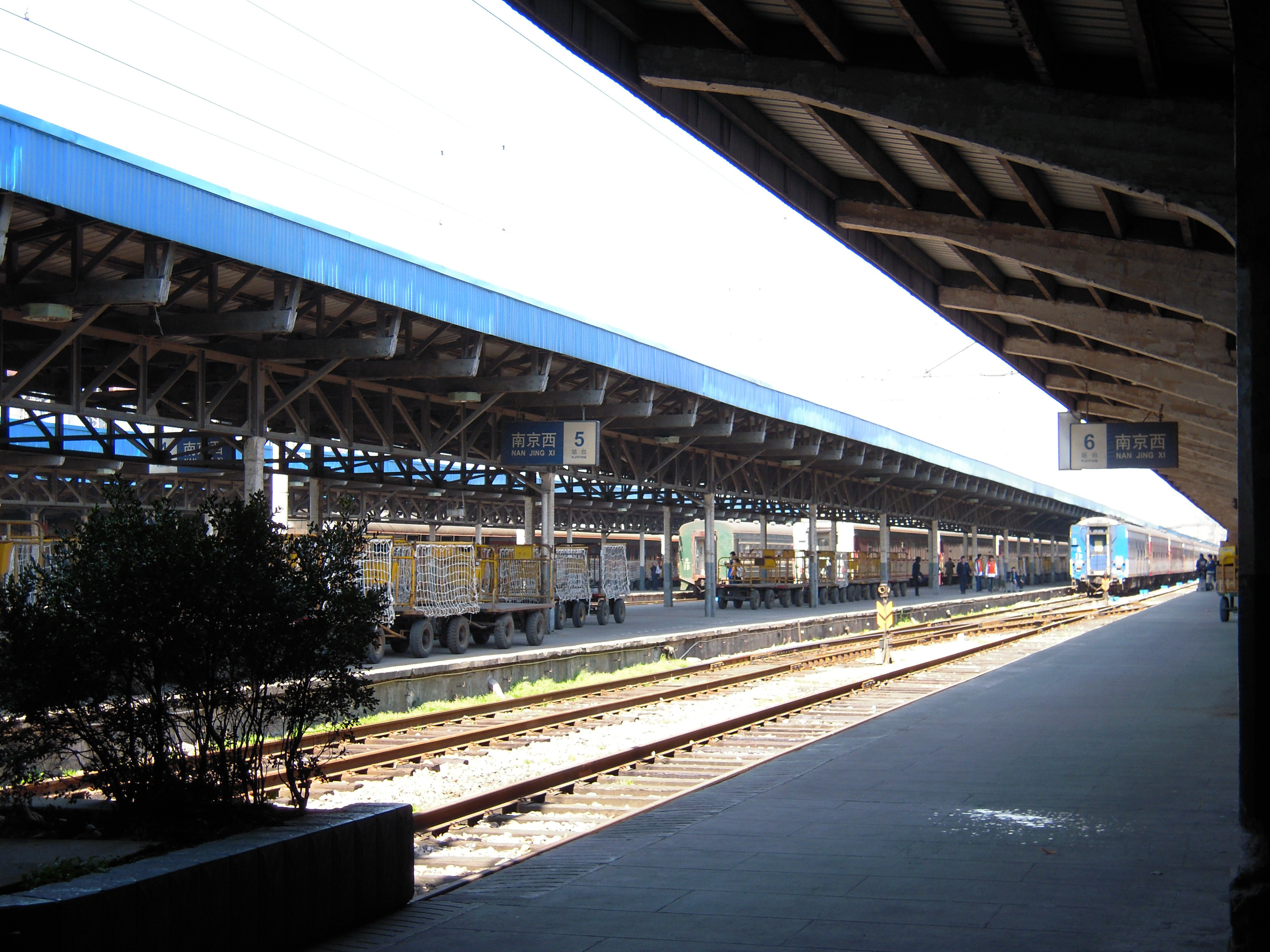
Platforms of Nanjing West railway station

== See also ==
- Nanjing railway station
- Nanjing South railway station
- Zhonghuamen railway station
- Nanjing North railway station
