= Shangyuanmen station =

Nanjing Metro station

Shangyuanmen 上元门
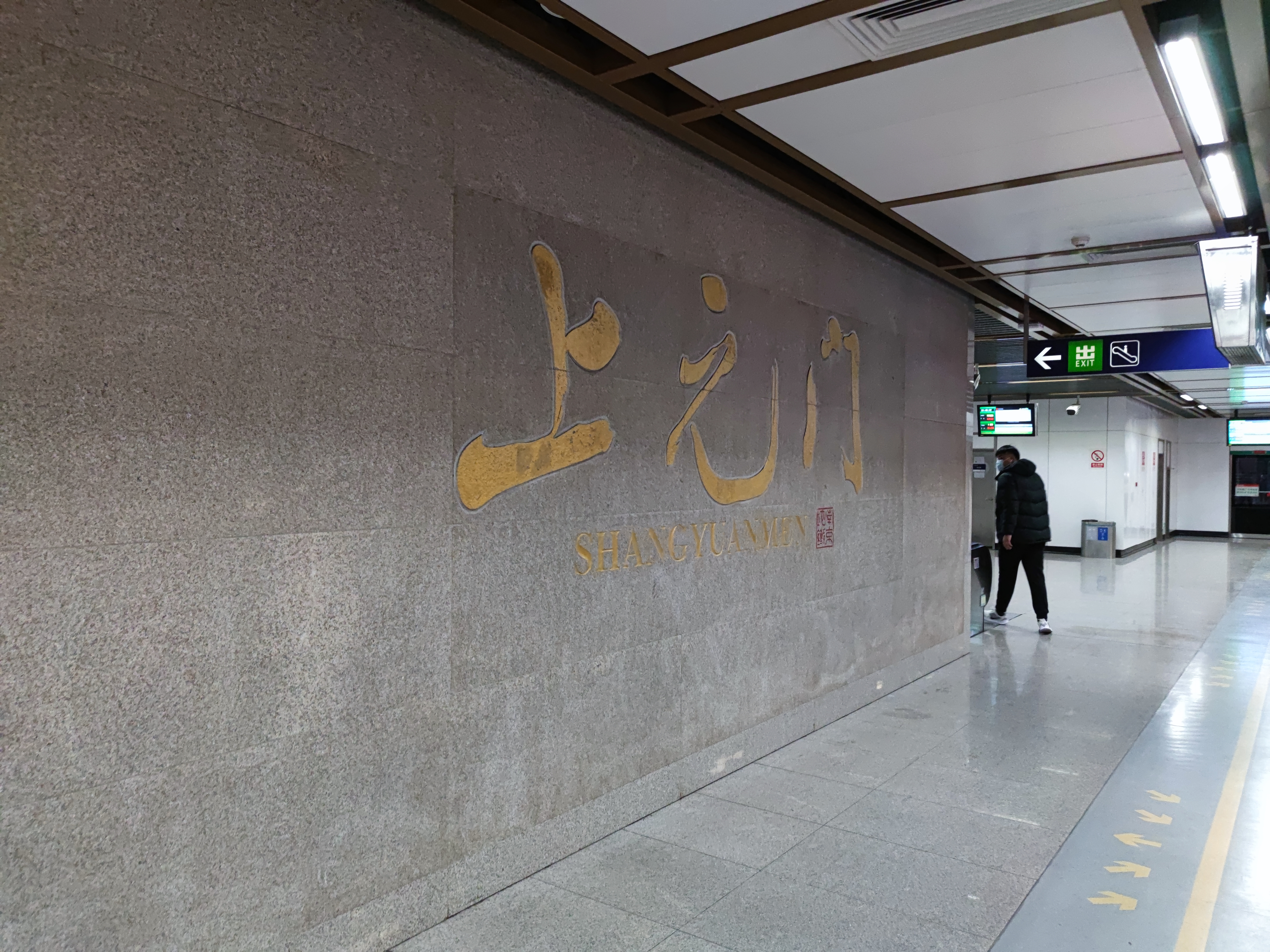

General information
- Location: North Zhongyang Road and Yanjiang Road (燕江路) / Yongji Avenue (永济大道); Gulou District, Nanjing, Jiangsu; China
- Coordinates: 32°06′56″N 118°46′12″E)
- Operated by: Nanjing Metro Co. Ltd.
- Line: Line 3

Construction
- Structure type: Underground

Other information
- Station code: 307

History
- Opened: 18 October 2015

Services
Preceding station	Nanjing Metro	Following station
Liuzhoudonglu towards Linchang	Line 3	Wutangguangchang towards Moling
Location

Shangyuanmen station (simplified Chinese: 上元门站; traditional Chinese: 上元門站; pinyin: Shàngyuánmén Zhàn) is a station of Line 3 on the Nanjing Metro. Most of the line entered operation on 1 April 2015. However, due to delays in construction work clearing land in the station's vicinity, Shangyuanmen station itself opened on 18 October 2015.
