= Liuzhoudonglu station =

Nanjing Metro station

Liuzhoudonglu 柳洲东路
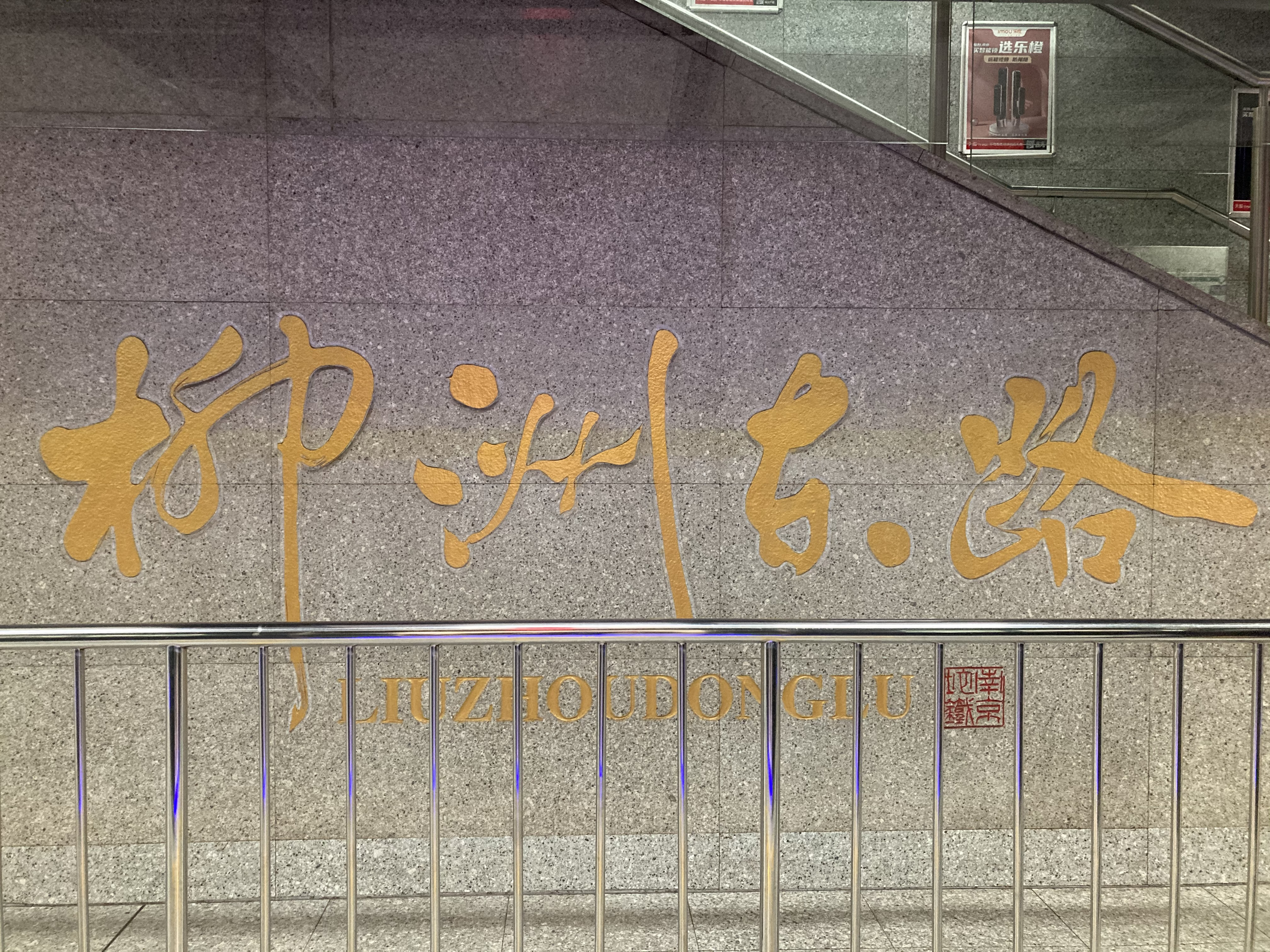

Chinese name
- Simplified Chinese: 柳洲东路站
- Traditional Chinese: 柳州東路站
- Literal meaning: East Liuzhou Road station
Transcriptions
Standard Mandarin
- Hanyu Pinyin: Liǔzhōudōnglù Zhàn

General information
- Location: East Liuzhou Road and Jiangshan Road (江山路); Pukou District, Nanjing, Jiangsu; China
- Coordinates: 32°08′24″N 118°44′46″E)
- Operated by: Nanjing Metro Co. Ltd.
- Line(s): Line 3

Construction
- Structure type: Underground

Other information
- Station code: 306

History
- Opened: 1 April 2015

Services
Preceding station	Nanjing Metro	Following station
Tianruncheng towards Linchang	Line 3	Shangyuanmen towards Mozhoudonglu
Location

Liuzhoudonglu station (Chinese: 柳洲东路站) is a station of Line 3 of the Nanjing Metro. It started operations on 1 April 2015.
