= Hunan Road Commercial Street =

Street in Nanjing, China

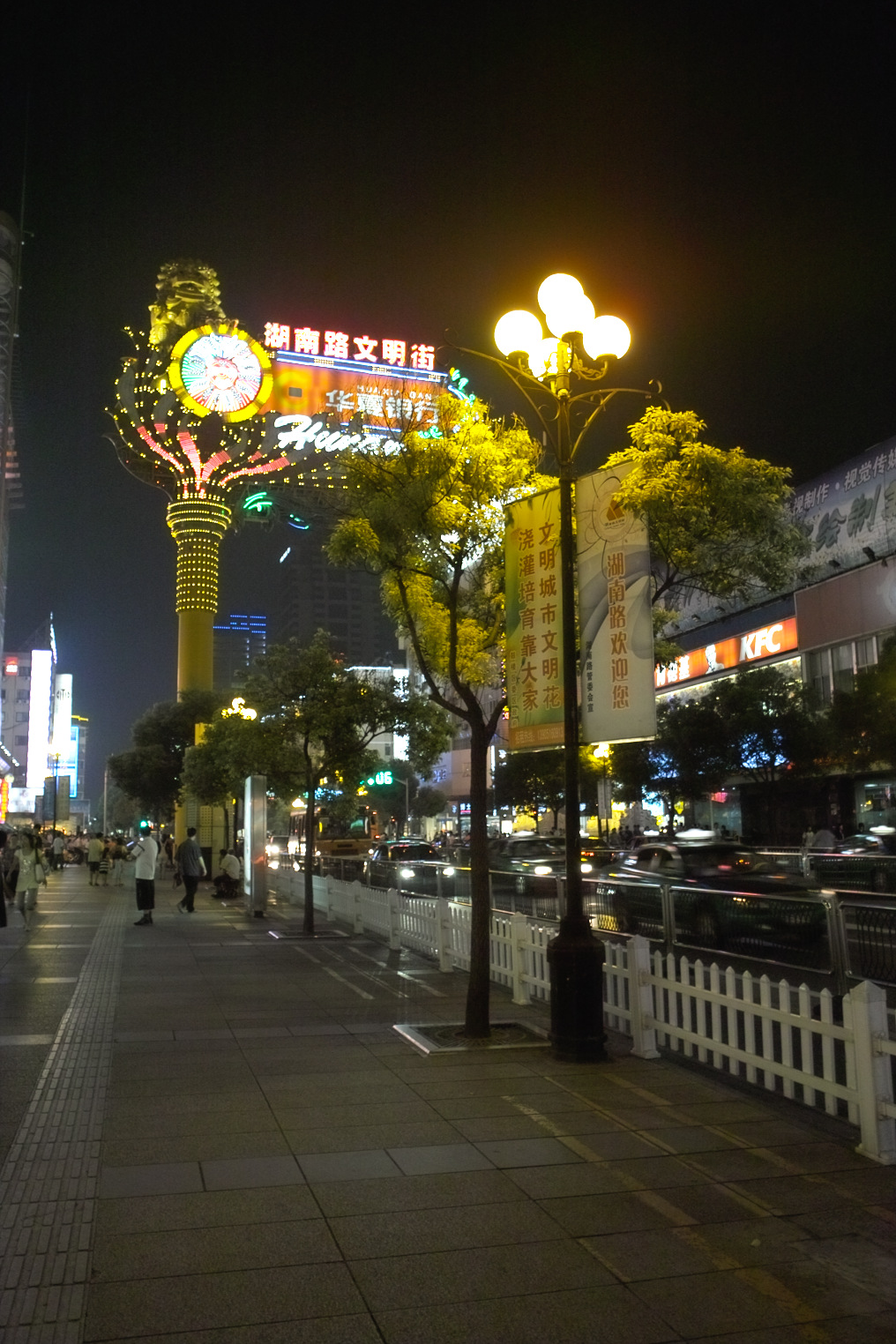
Hunan Road at night

Hunan Road Commercial Street (湖南路购物街) is located in the northwest of the downtown area of Nanjing, in Gulou District. Its total length is 1,100 meters, and the road is 30 meters wide. There are all kinds of shops on 238 Street, of which brand and boutique stores account for 83% of the total business area of 87,000 square meters.

== History ==
=== Construction ===
Hunan Road extension was built in 1927, at which time Nanjing was the capital of the Republic of China. Some of the new extensions of the road were named according to their geographical position, or the provincial or city name. In this way, the new extension of the road was named Hunan Road.

=== Political events ===
The Senate Interim Government of the Republic of China and the KMT headquarters had put their offices in this road. Several important events have occurred here, such as:

- Organizing the central provisional government
- Electing Provisional President of the Republic of China, Sun Yat-sen
- Sun Fengming's assassination attempt on Wang Jingwei
- Chen Bray's suicide

Sun Fengming's assassination attempt on Wang Jingwei is especially noteworthy because it ignited the country and the world. It was a sensational event that shocked the world.

== Lion Bridge Walk Food Street ==
Lion Bridge Walk Food Street is located in the middle of Hunan Road. It is one line of five branch roads of Hunan Road. Its length is 330 meters, and width is 12–16 meters. The street was originally a farmer's market. In early 2000, the Gulou District government invested 8.8 million yuan for comprehensive reform and renovation. This included a full range of granite paving, a new color landscape dry fountain, planters, landscape lights, lounge chairs, public telephone kiosks and other public facilities. All residential buildings along the street applied for new European technology and put a Lion landmark on the buildings.

Lion Walk Food Street units include financial, lighting, automation, landscaping and cleaning. It has gathered nearly 40 businesses, including food eateries, restaurants and noodles. In a trial operation from June 2000 to the end of 2000, the whole turnover was 48 million yuan and rent of $2.4 million was paid. In the first 6 months of 2001, the total turnover was more than 52 million and 2.52 million yuan was turned over to rent.
