= Nanjing World Trade Center Tower 1 =

Supertall skyscraper in Nanjing, Jiangsu, China

Coordinates: 31.995685°N 118.718247°E

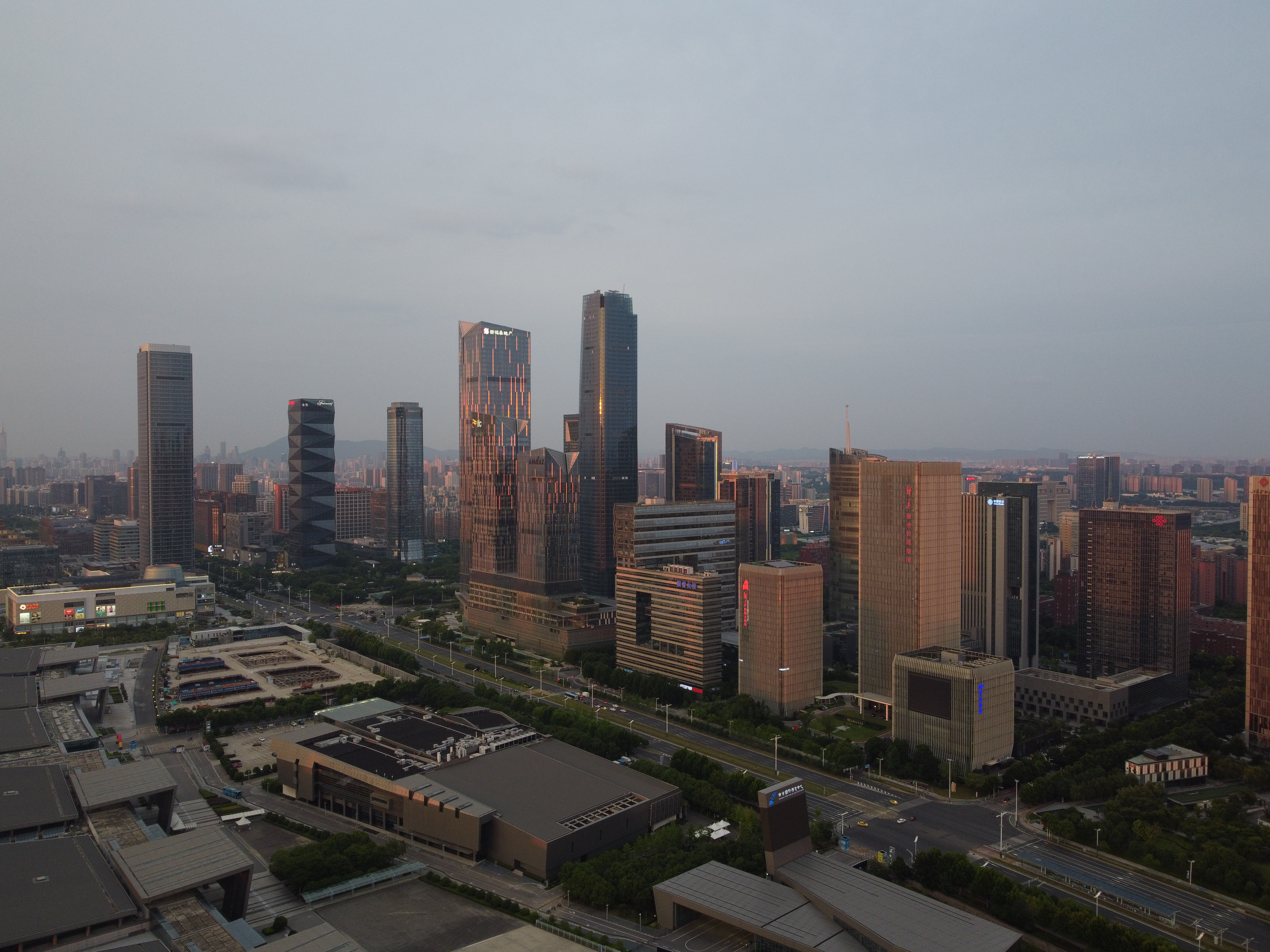
- Interactive map of the Nanjing World Trade Center Tower 1 area

General information
- Status: Completed
- Location: Nanjing, Jiangsu, Hexi Street, China
- Construction started: 2011
- Completed: 2022

Height
- Architectural: 326.5 meters (1,071.2 ft)

Technical details
- Floor count: 68

Nanjing World Trade Center Tower 1 is a supertall skyscraper built in Nanjing, Jiangsu, China. It will be 326.5 meters (1,071.2 ft) tall. Construction started in 2011 and is expected to be completed in 2022.

== See also ==
- List of tallest buildings in China
