= Zhonghuamen railway station =

Railway station in Nanjing, China

Zhonghuamen 中华门
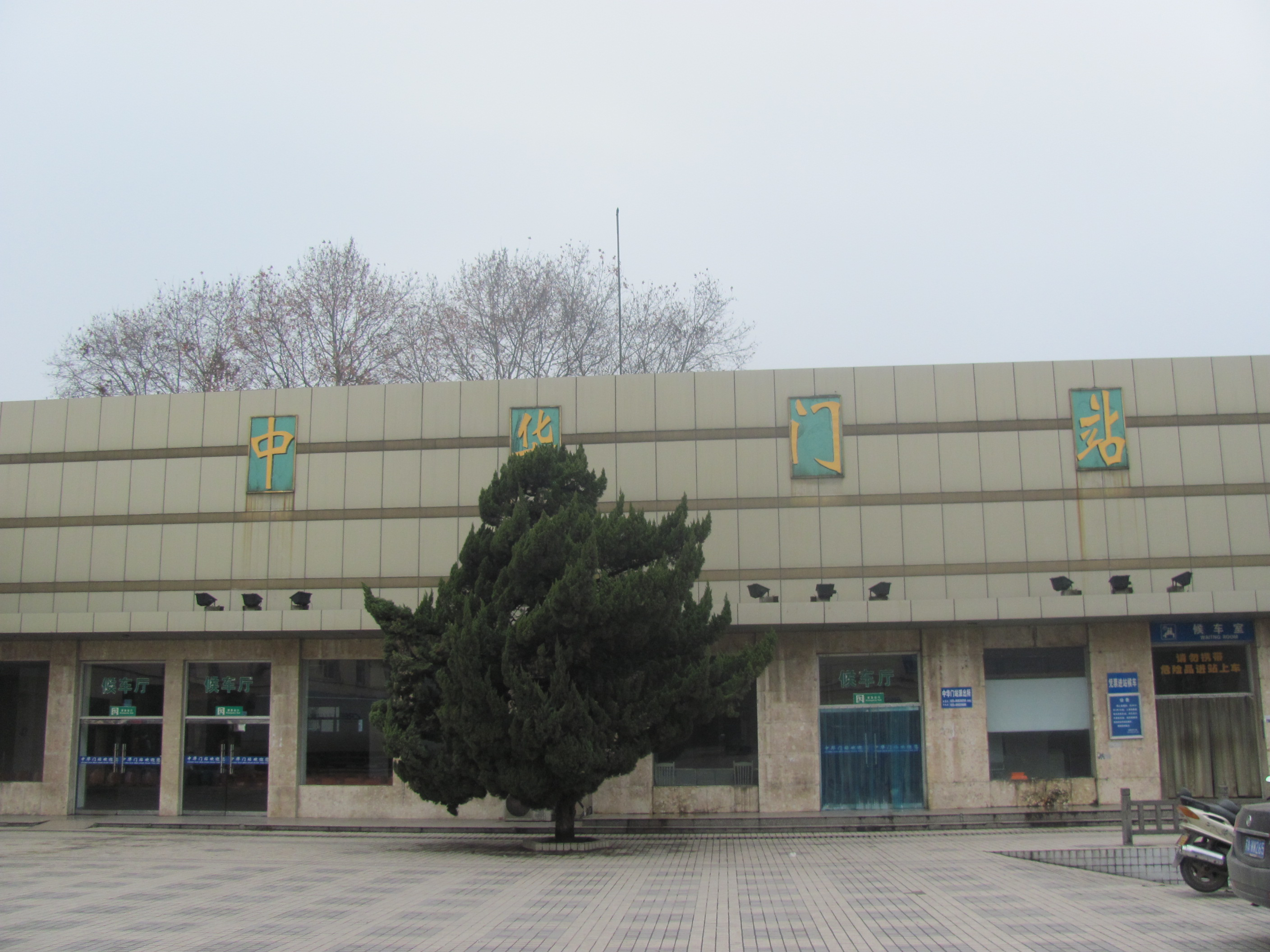
- Zhonghuamen railway station

General information
- Location: 339 Yingtian Ave, Yuhuatai District, Nanjing
- Coordinates: 32°00′30″N 118°46′24″E
- Line: Nanjing–Tongling railway

Other information
- Station code: 30743 (TMIS code); VNH (telegram code)
Location

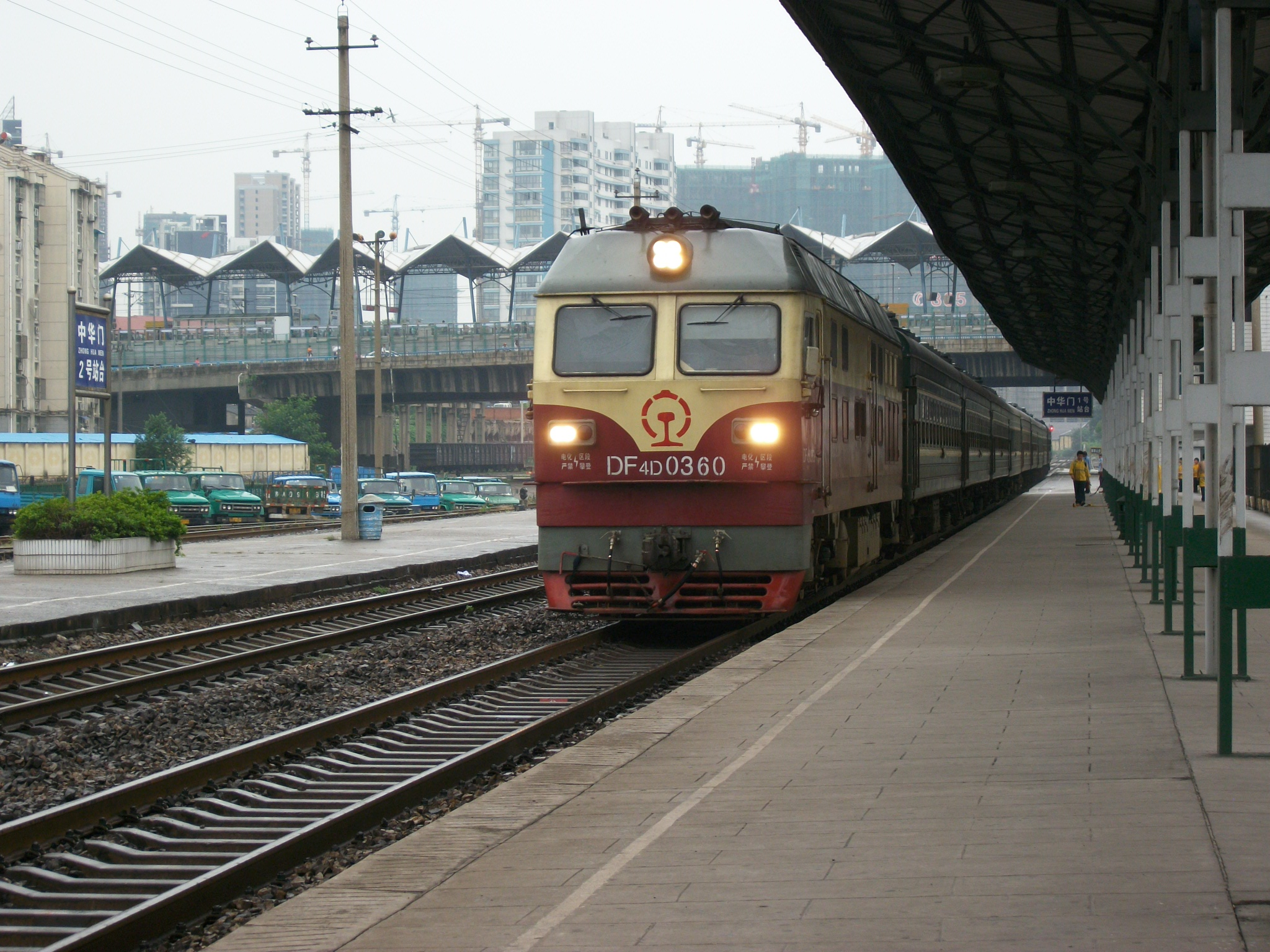
Platform

Zhonghuamen railway station (Chinese: 中华门火车站) is a railway station in Yuhua Road near Zhonghua Gate of Nanjing. It is a station of Nanjing–Tongling railway, with two platforms.

Built in 1935 as part of the Jiangnan Railway, the station served as the main passage from central Nanjing to Wuhu. It was seriously damaged during the Second Sino-Japanese War as well as during the Chinese Civil War, and only returned to service in January 1948. The station underwent a series of expansion projects in the 1980s and 1990s, and was briefly renamed as Nanjing South Railway Station in 1998. On 6 January 2011, the station was restored to its old name to avoid confusion with the newer Nanjing South railway station, which is further uptown and operates high-speed rail services. Passenger services stopped in October 2014.

The station is served by the nearby Zhonghuamen Metro Station.

== See also ==
- Nanjing railway station
- Nanjing South railway station
- Nanjing West railway station
- Nanjing North railway station
