= Xinjiekou station (Nanjing Metro) =

Nanjing Metro interchange station

Coordinates: 32°02′28″N 118°47′03″E

Xinjiekou 新街口
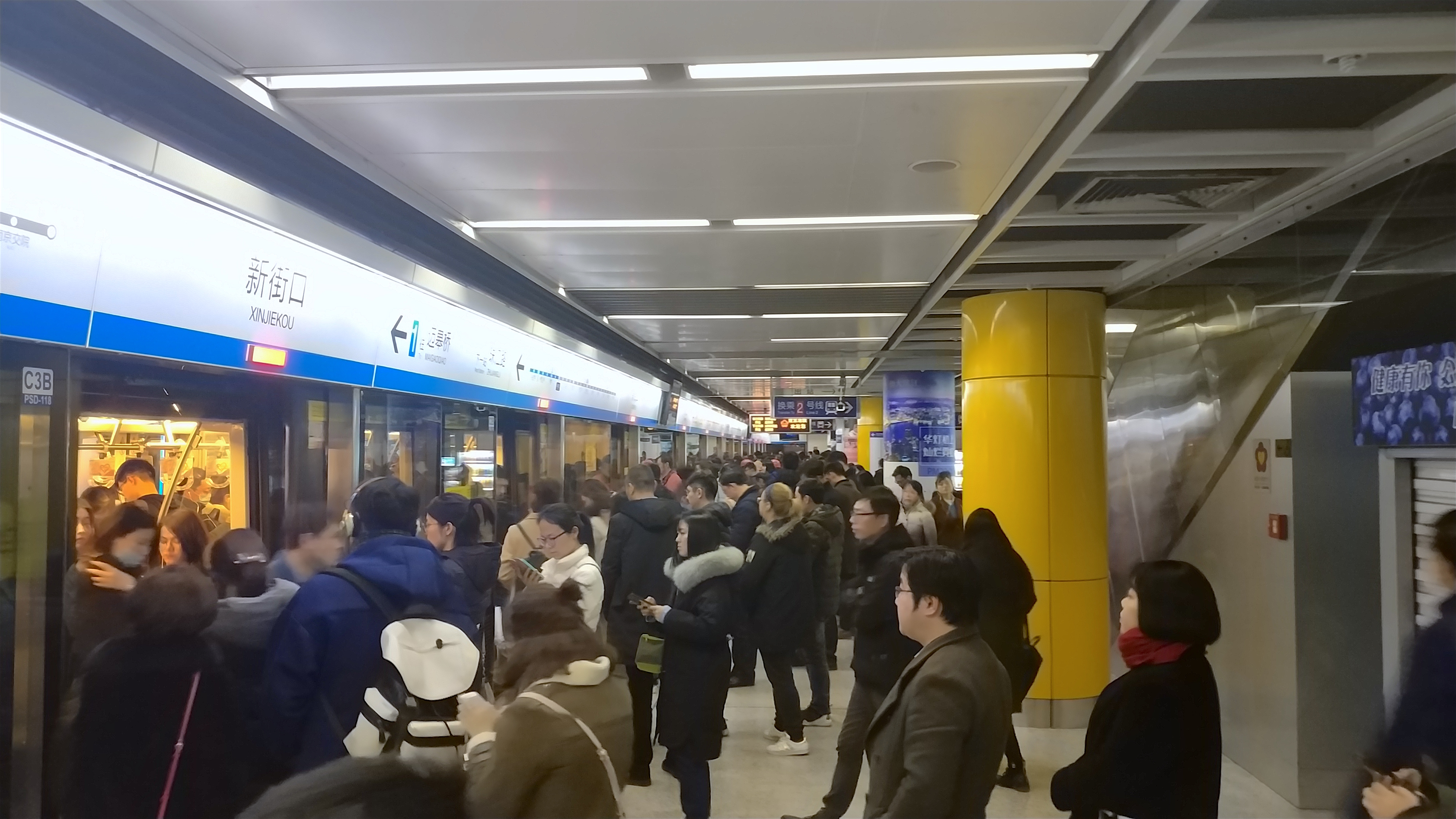
- The Line 1 platform of Xinjiekou station

General information
- Location: Xinjiekou, Qinhuai District, Nanjing, Jiangsu; China
- Lines: Line 1; Line 2

Other information
- Station code: 120 (Line 1); 215 (Line 2)

History
- Opened: 3 September 2005 (Line 1); 28 May 2010 (Line 2)

Services
Preceding station	Nanjing Metro	Following station
Zhujianglu towards Baguazhoudaqiaonan	Line 1	Zhangfuyuan towards CPU
Shanghailu towards Yuzui	Line 2	Daxinggong towards Jingtianlu
Location
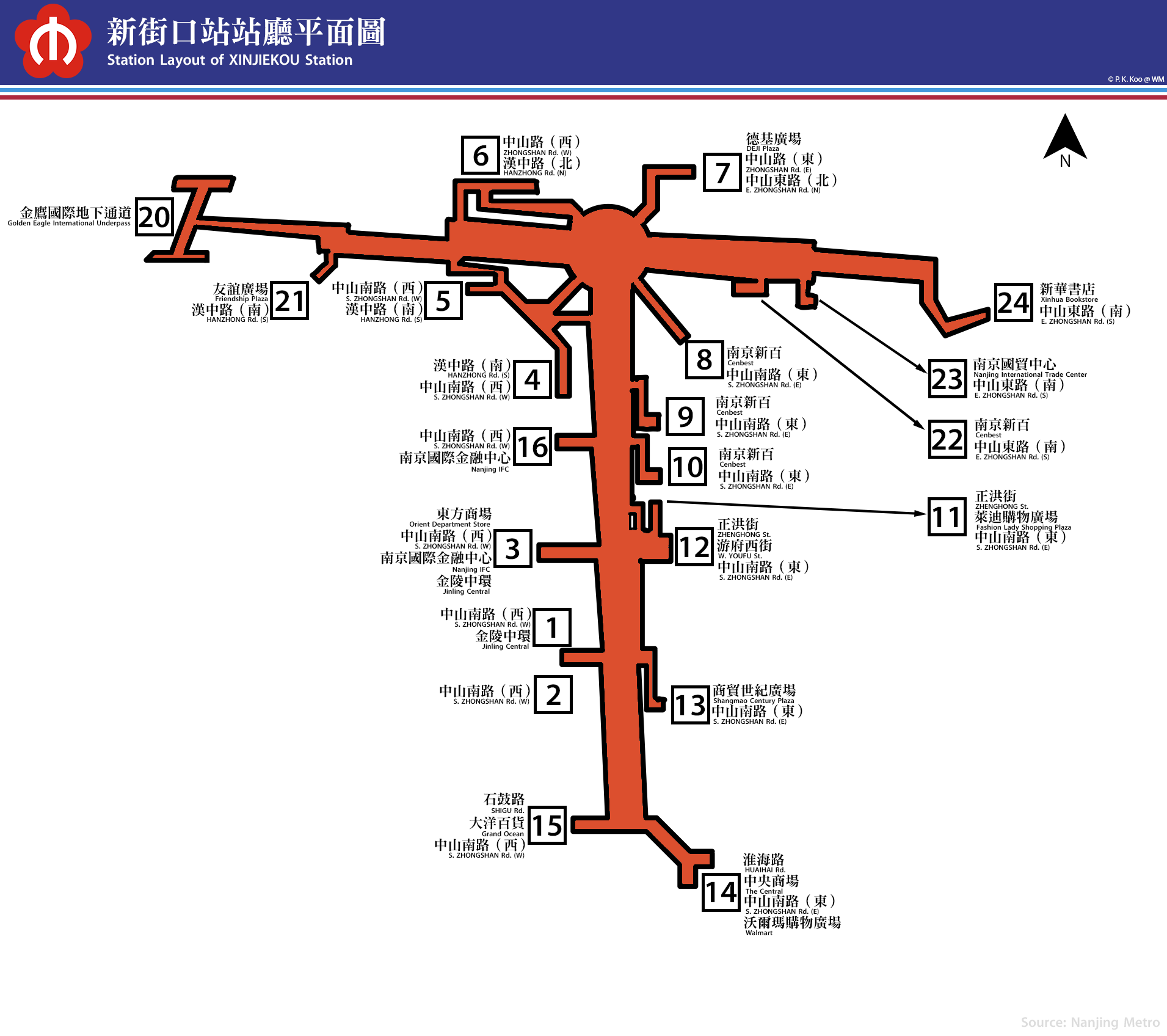

Xinjiekou station (Chinese: 新街口站; pinyin: Xīnjiēkǒu Zhàn) is an interchange station between Line 1 and Line 2 of the Nanjing Metro. It is located in Xinjiekou, the central business and commercial district of Nanjing. The largest and busiest station in the system, Xinjiekou station has 25 officially marked exits. On 30 September 2016 the station served a peak volume of 130,500 passengers. Trains here stop for 55 seconds, the longest stop at a non-terminus station in a mainland Chinese metro system.

== Opening dates ==
The station on line 1 began operations on 3 September 2005 as part of the line's Phase I from Maigaoqiao to Andemen. (Note: The section from Andemen to Olympic Stadium that initially opened as Line 1 was re-designated as Line 10 when the latter opened in 2014.) The interchange with line 2 opened along with the opening of the entire line on 28 May 2010.

== Gallery ==
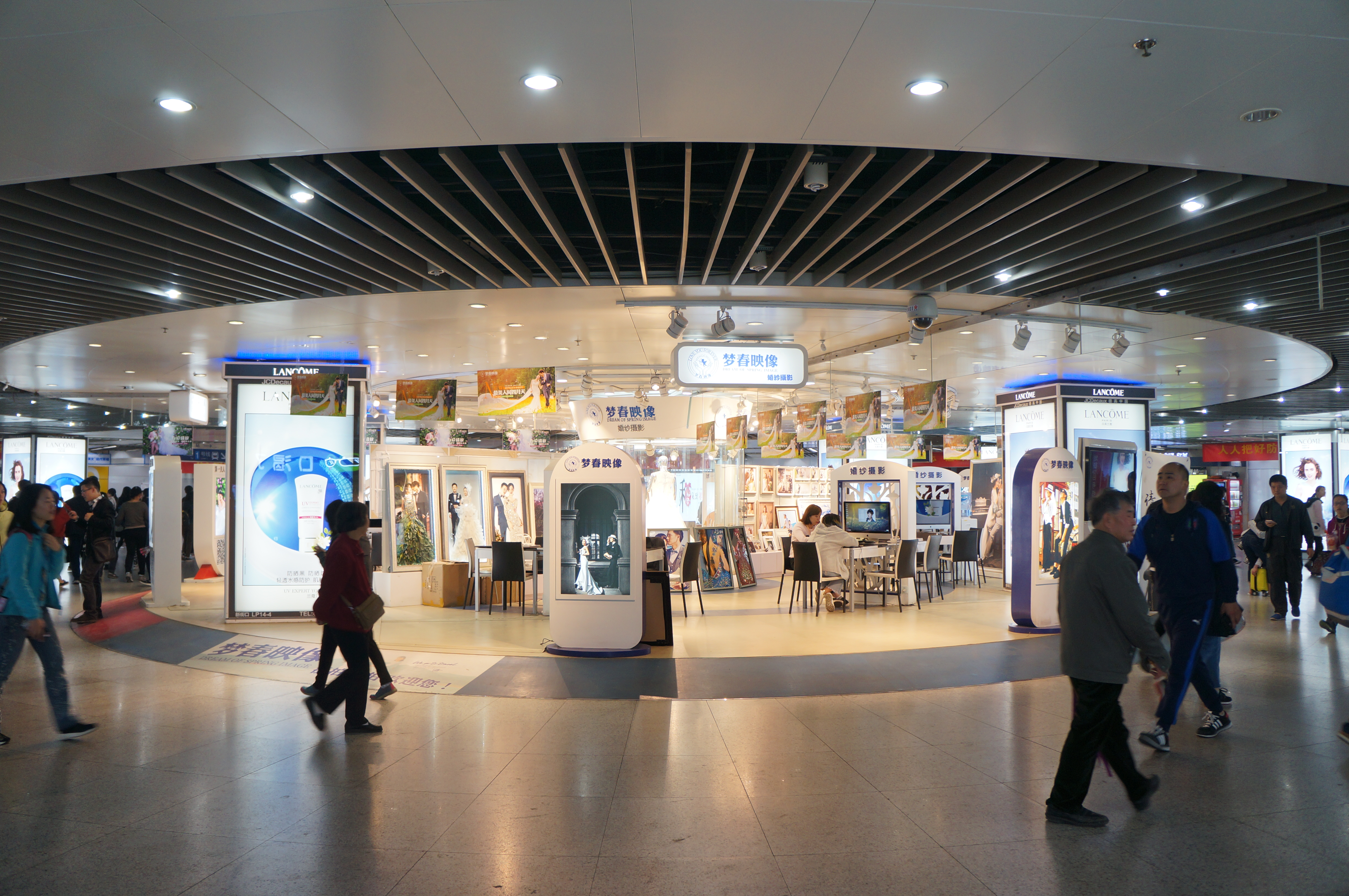
Xinjiekou Shopping Center

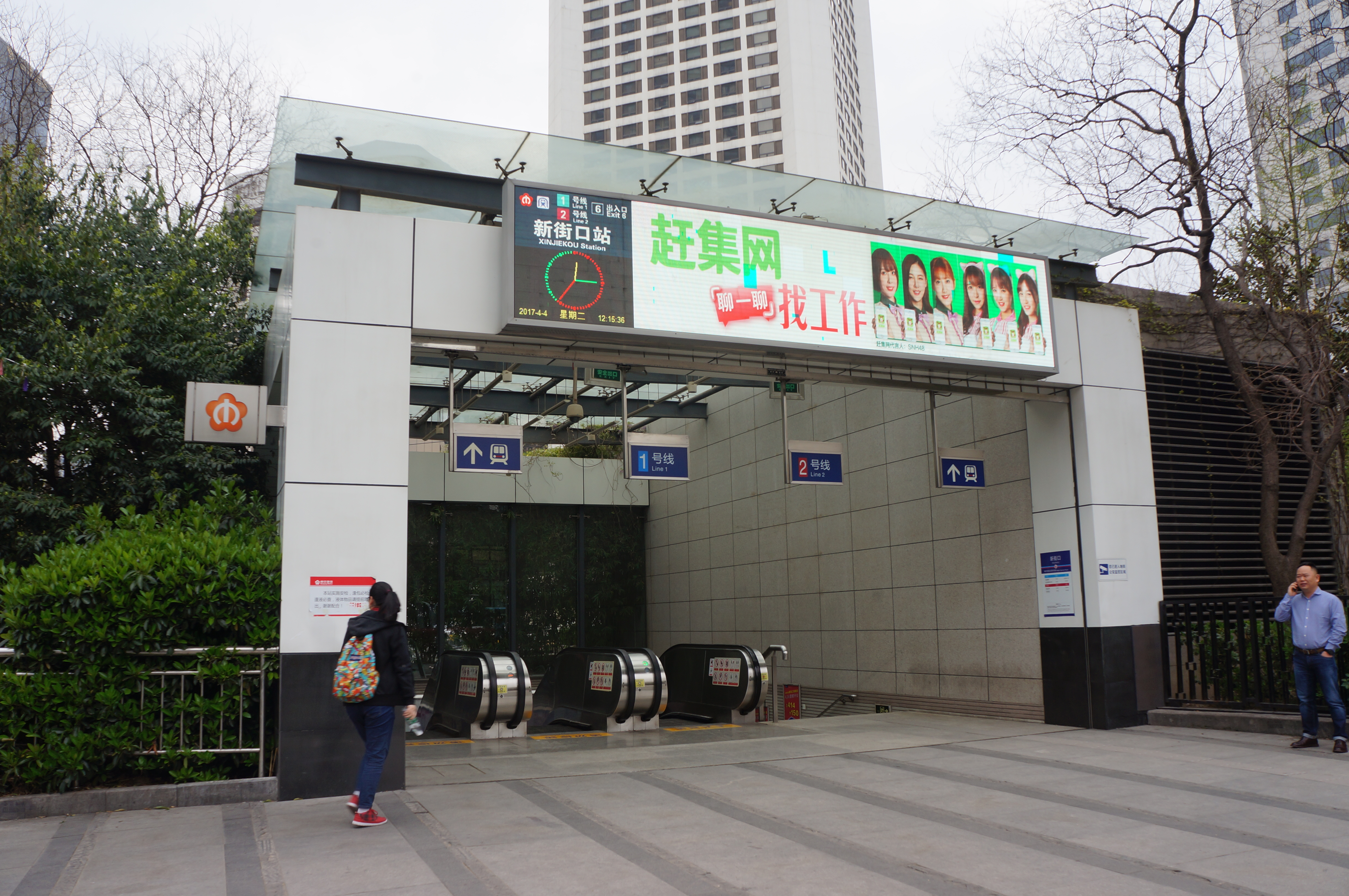
Exit 6

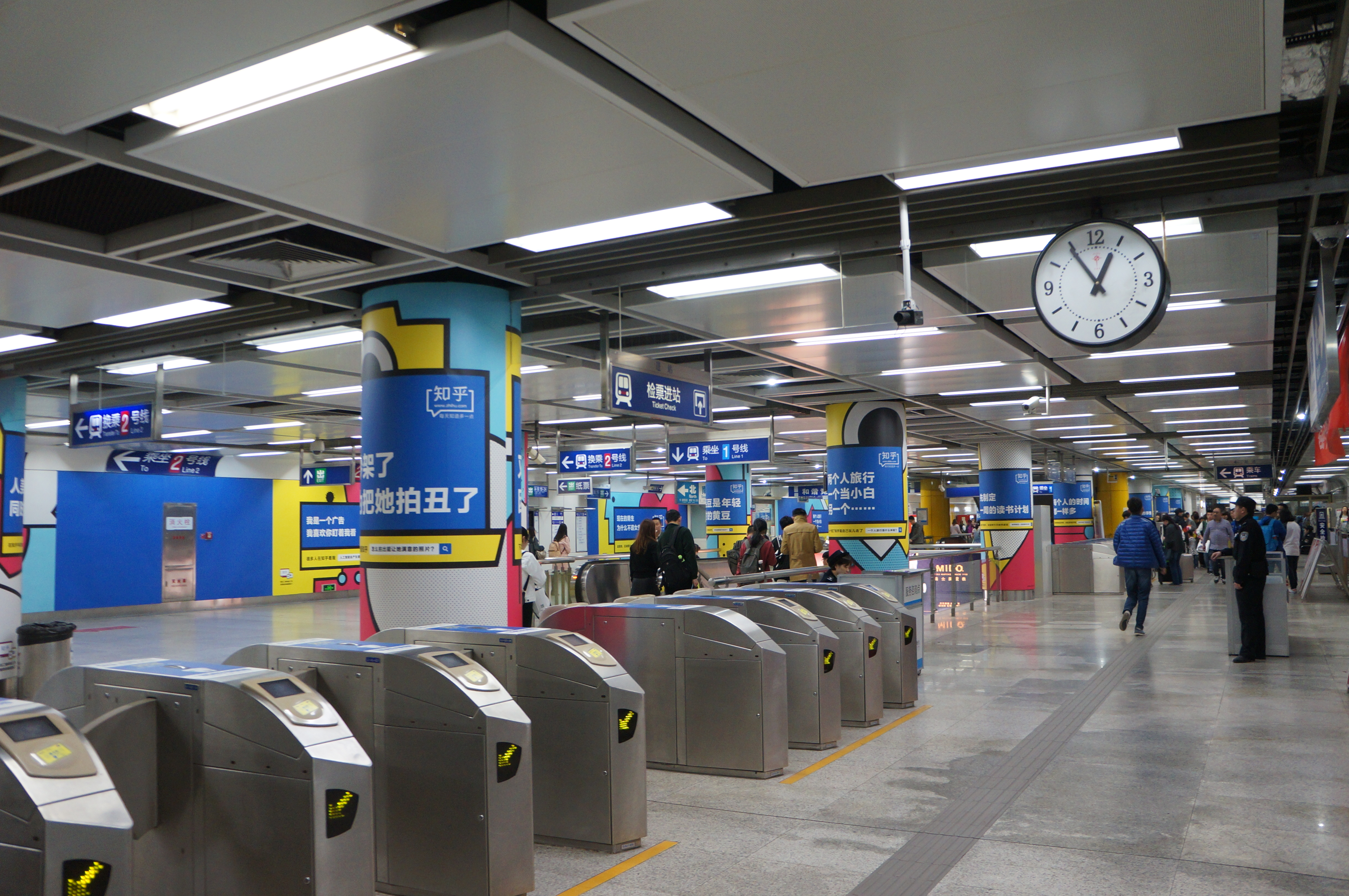
Line 1 concourse

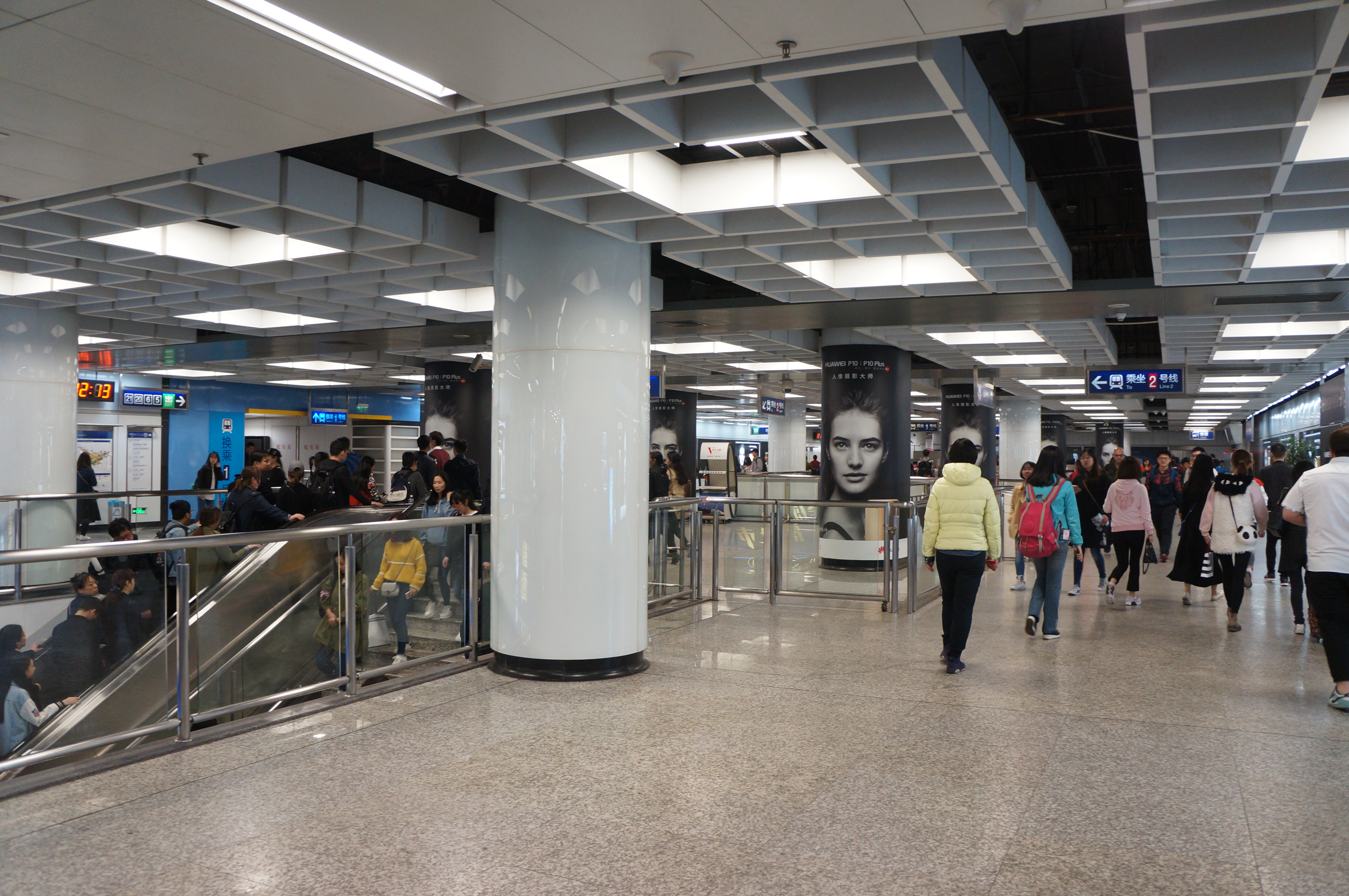
Line 2 western concourse

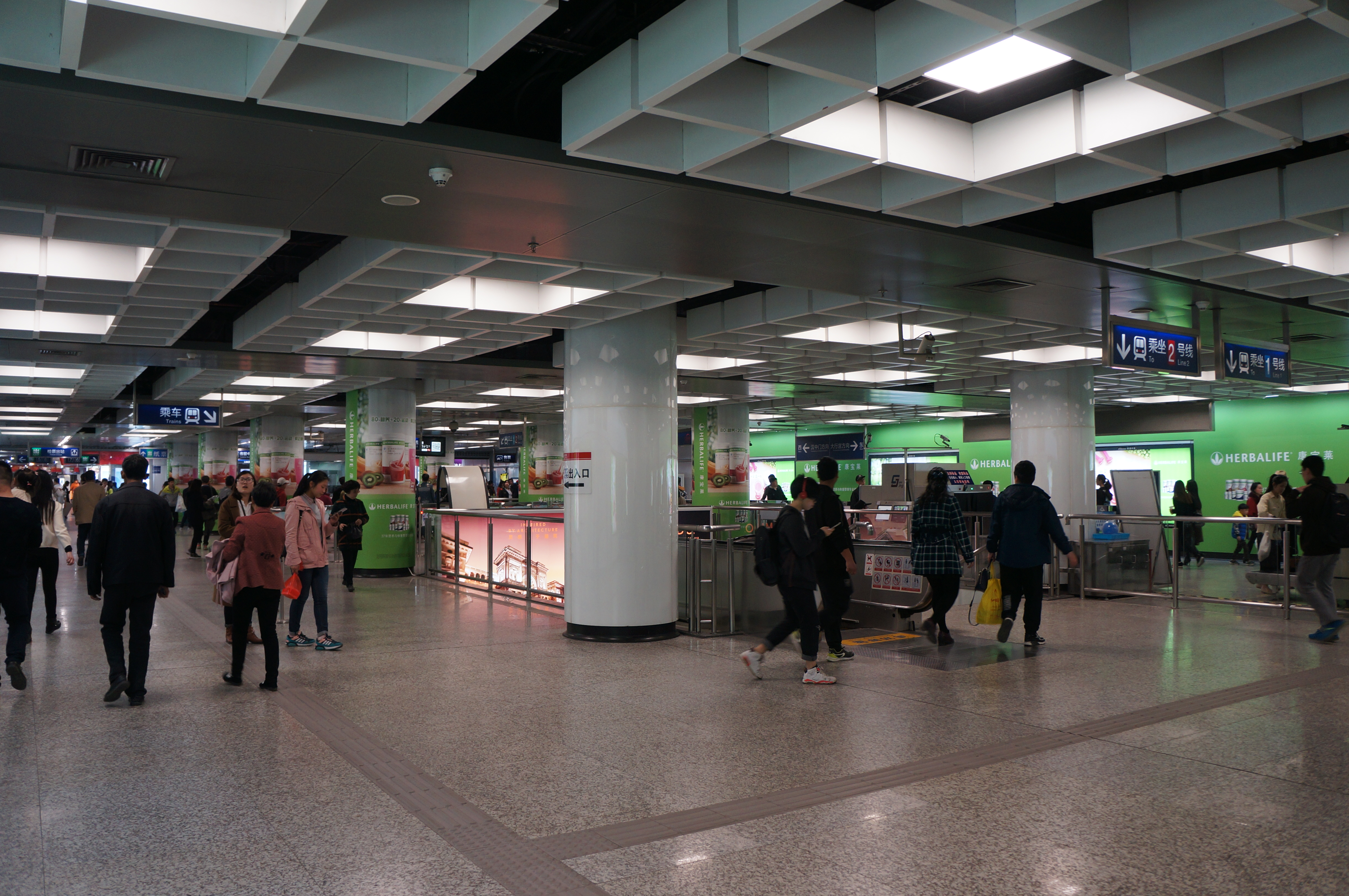
Line 2 eastern concourse

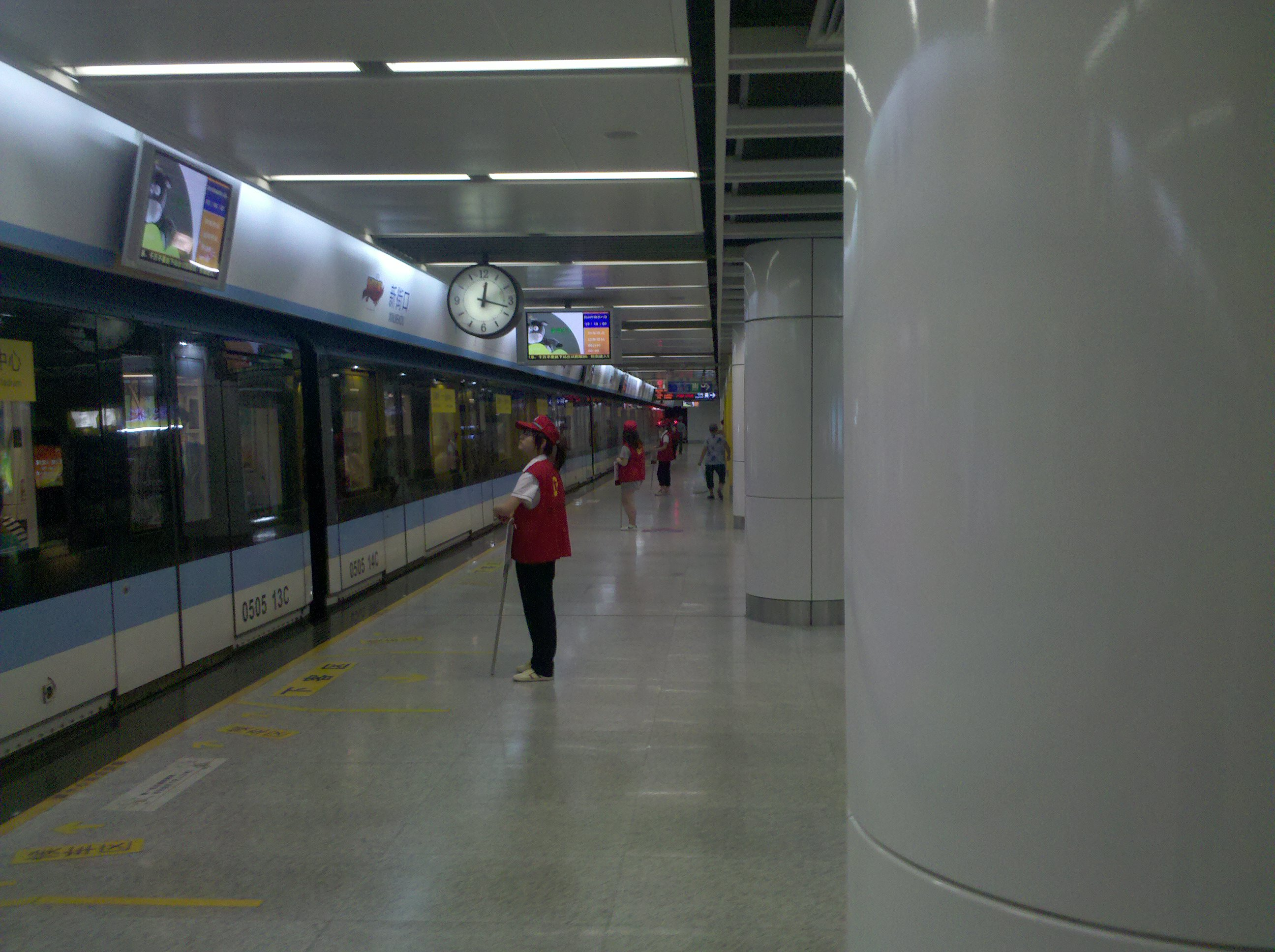
Line 1 platform in 2010

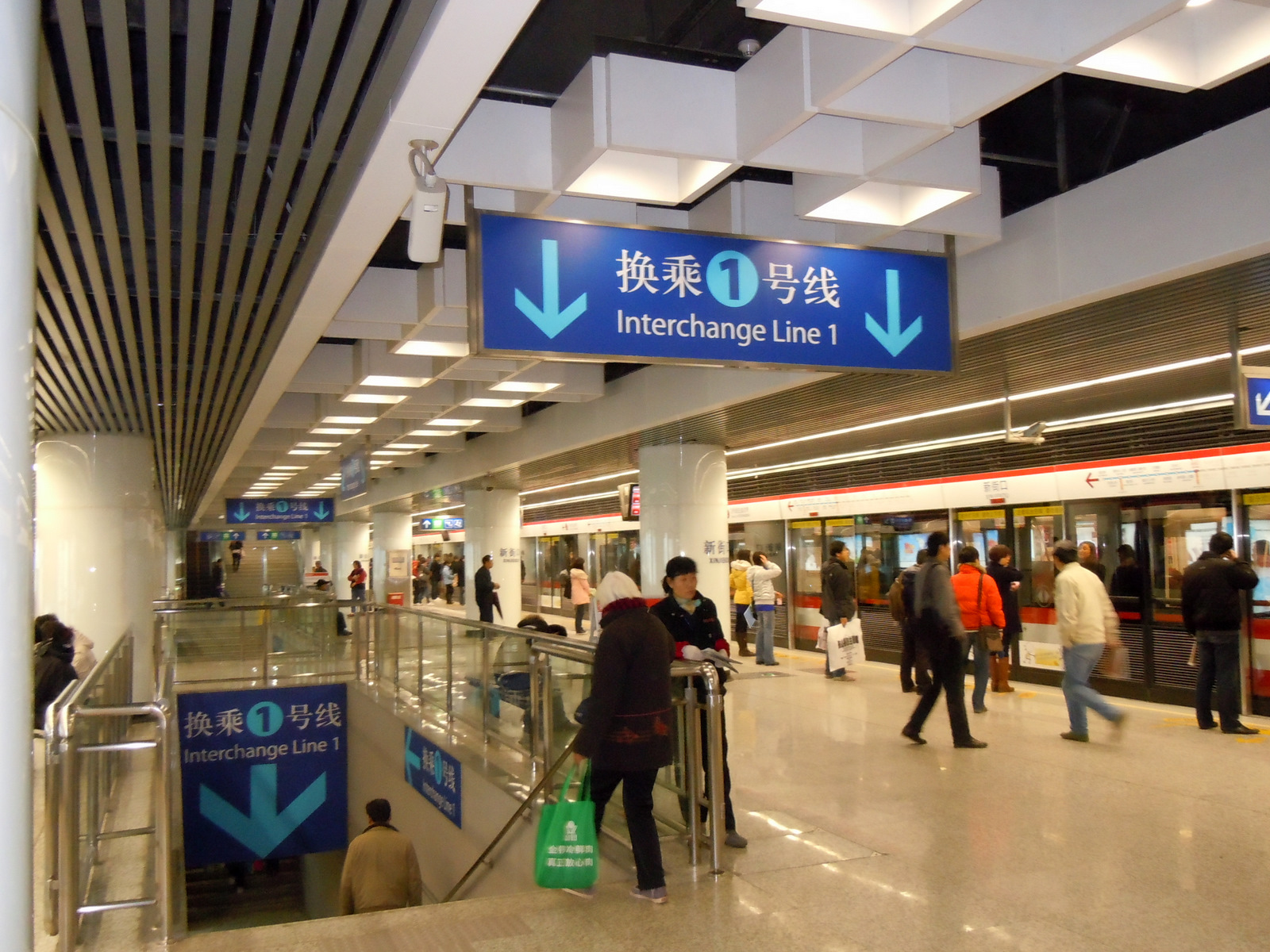
Line 2 platform in 2010
