= Xinjiekou, Nanjing =

Area of Nanjing, China

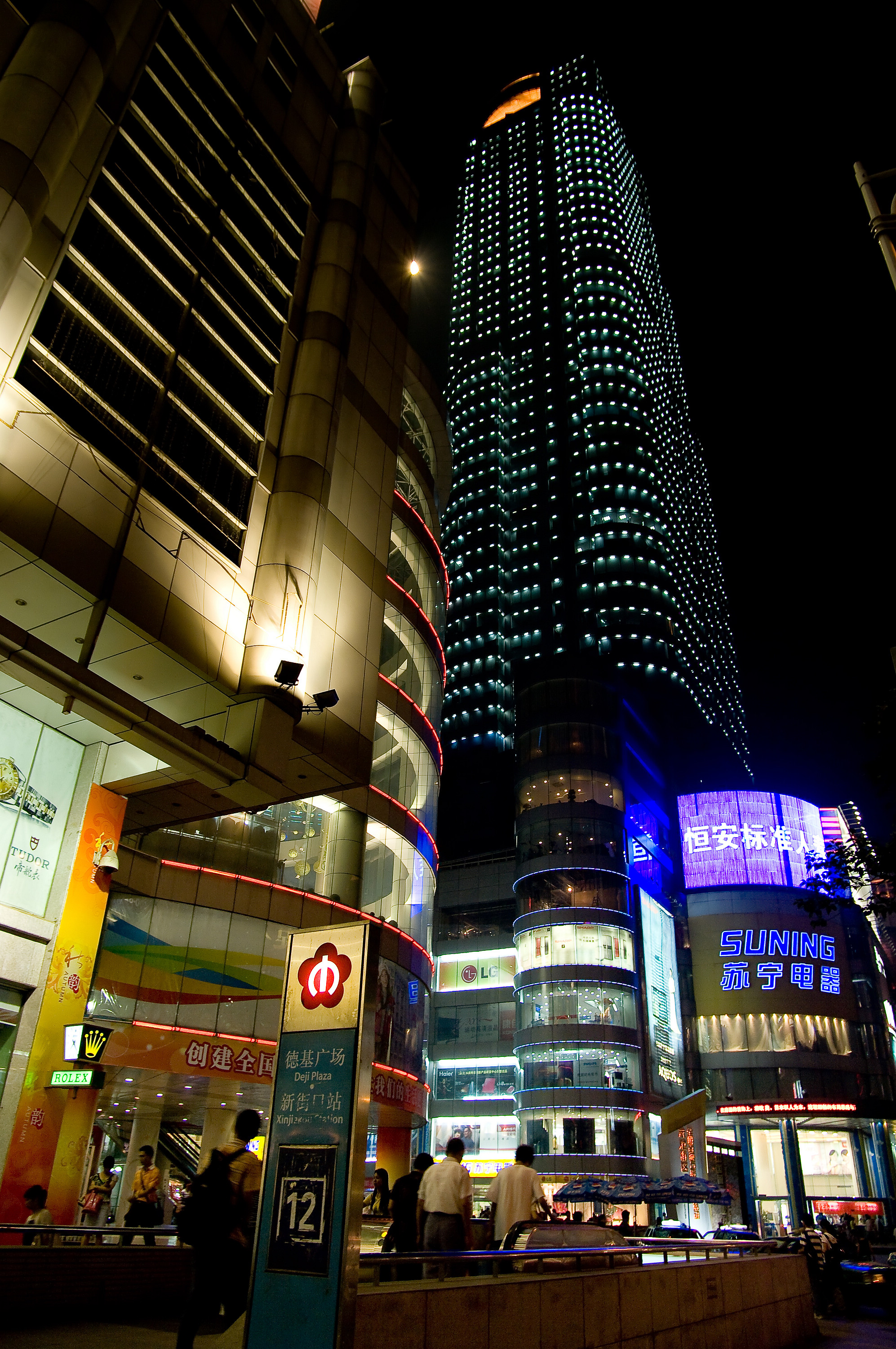
Entrance of Xinjiekou Station

Xinjiekou (Chinese: 新街口; pinyin: Xīnjiēkǒu) is the central business district of Nanjing, People's Republic of China. It gave its name to Xinjiekou subway station.

== History ==
Xinjiekou is an ancient site in Nanjing. In ancient times, it was only a quiet and lonely street with much empty space and a pond. Since 1929, the location has changed greatly; four main roads of 40-meter-width met here: Zhongshan Eastern Road, Zhongzheng Road (Zhongshan Southern Road), Hanzhong Road, and Zhongshan Road, with a traffic circle in the center. On the grounds of the new traffic circle, Xinjiekou became the newly developing commercial center. In the 1930s, many buildings sprang up, like The Domestic Bank, Zhejiang Xingye Bank, Bank of Communications, the Central Shopping Center, Dahua Theater, Xindu Theater, and Fuchang Restaurant. In the 1980s, Jinling Restaurant was the tallest building.

Nanjing Xinjiekou Department Store Company will buy an 89 percent stake in Highland Group Holdings Ltd, which owns the U.K. department store chain House of Fraser.

== The Business Circle ==
- Hongwu Road Financial Street
- Zhenghong Road Commercial Walkong Street
- Peace Northern Road Gold and Jewel Street
- Wangfu Delicious Food Street
- Shigu Road Pub Street
- yeshan Folk Culture Street
- Chaoxi Antique and Painting Street
- Mochou Road Antique Street
- Changjiang Road Culture Street
- Cangxiang Ming and Qing Dynasty Street
- Huaihai Road the ROC Culture Street

As the CBD of Nanjing, Xinjiekou has many economic institutions, consulting corporations, law offices, accounting firms, and corporate headquarters—with the largest number of offices in Nanjing, including 80 business enterprises among the top 500 global corporations.

== See also ==
- Xinjiekou (Beijing)
