= Fangjiaying station =

Metro station in Nanjing, China

Fangjiaying 方家营
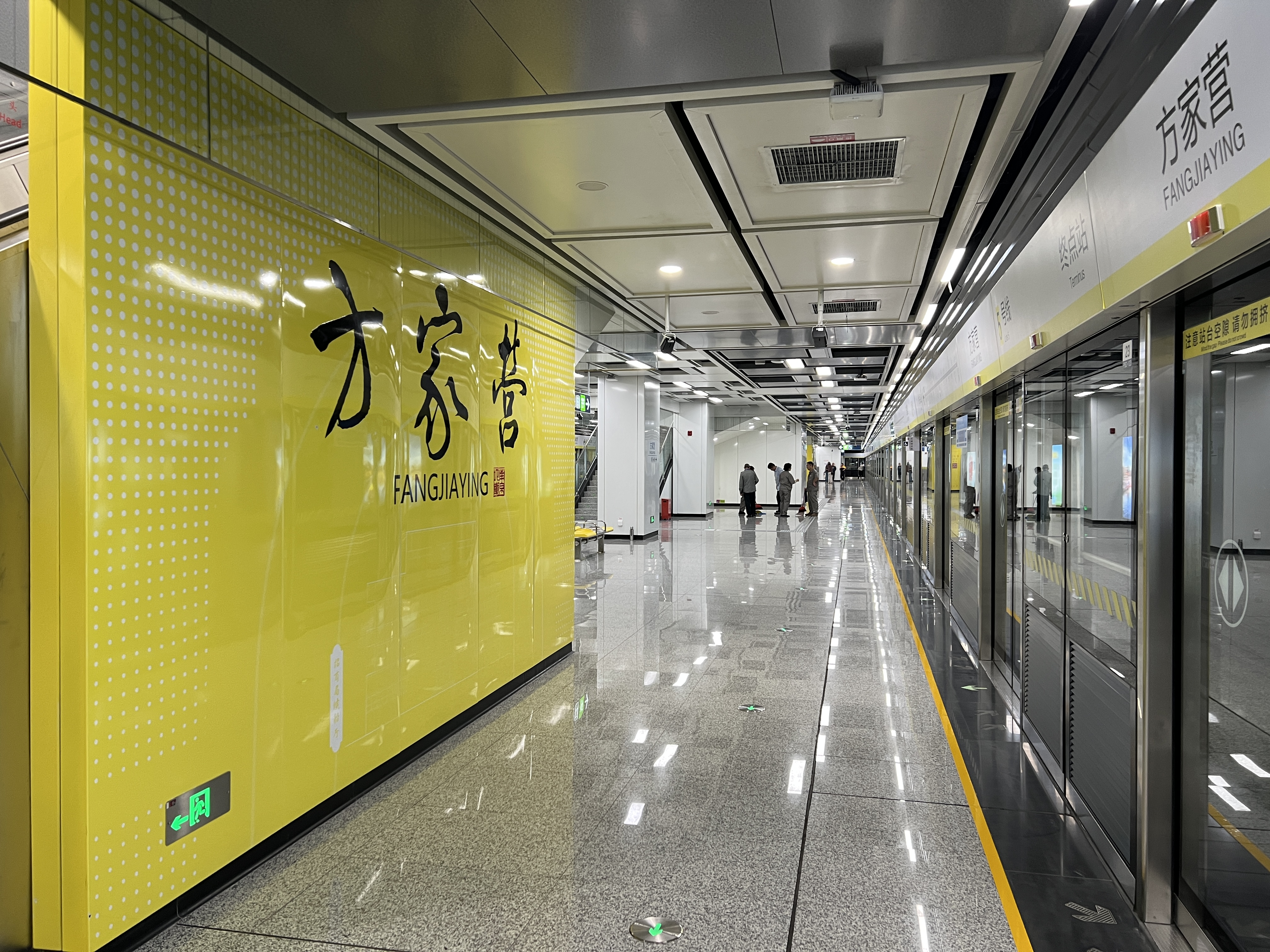
- Fangjiaying Station Platform (August 2025)

General information
- Location: Gulou District, Nanjing, Jiangsu; China
- Operated by: Nanjing Metro Co. Ltd.
- Line: Line 5

Construction
- Structure type: Underground

History
- Opened: 6 August 2025

Services
Preceding station	Nanjing Metro	Following station
Terminus	Line 5	Nanjingxi Railway Station towards Jiyindadao
Location

Fangjiaying station is (Chinese: 方家营站) is a station of Line 5 of the Nanjing Metro. It began operations on 6 August 2025. The station is oriented on an east–west axis, underneath Fangjiaying Road and the Fangjiaying north street.
