= Nanjing North railway station =

Railway station in Nanjing, Jiangsu, China

Nanjing North 南京北

General information
- Location: Pukou District, Nanjing, Jiangsu; China
- Line(s): Beijing–Shanghai railway Nanjing–Qidong railway Nanjing–Huai'an high-speed railway (planned); North Yangtze high-speed railway (U/C)

Nanjing North railway station (Chinese: 南京北站) is an under construction railway station located in Pukou District, Nanjing, Jiangsu, China. On opening it will be the third railway hub in Nanjing, following Nanjing railway station and Nanjing South railway station.

== History ==
In June 2019, it was stated that Nanjing North railway station would be completed by 2025.

Construction officially started on 28 December 2020.

== Metro station ==
Nanjing North railway station will be served by Lines 3, 4, 15, 18, and S4 of Nanjing Metro.
