= Gulou, Nanjing =

District in Jiangsu, China

Gulou 鼓楼区
- District
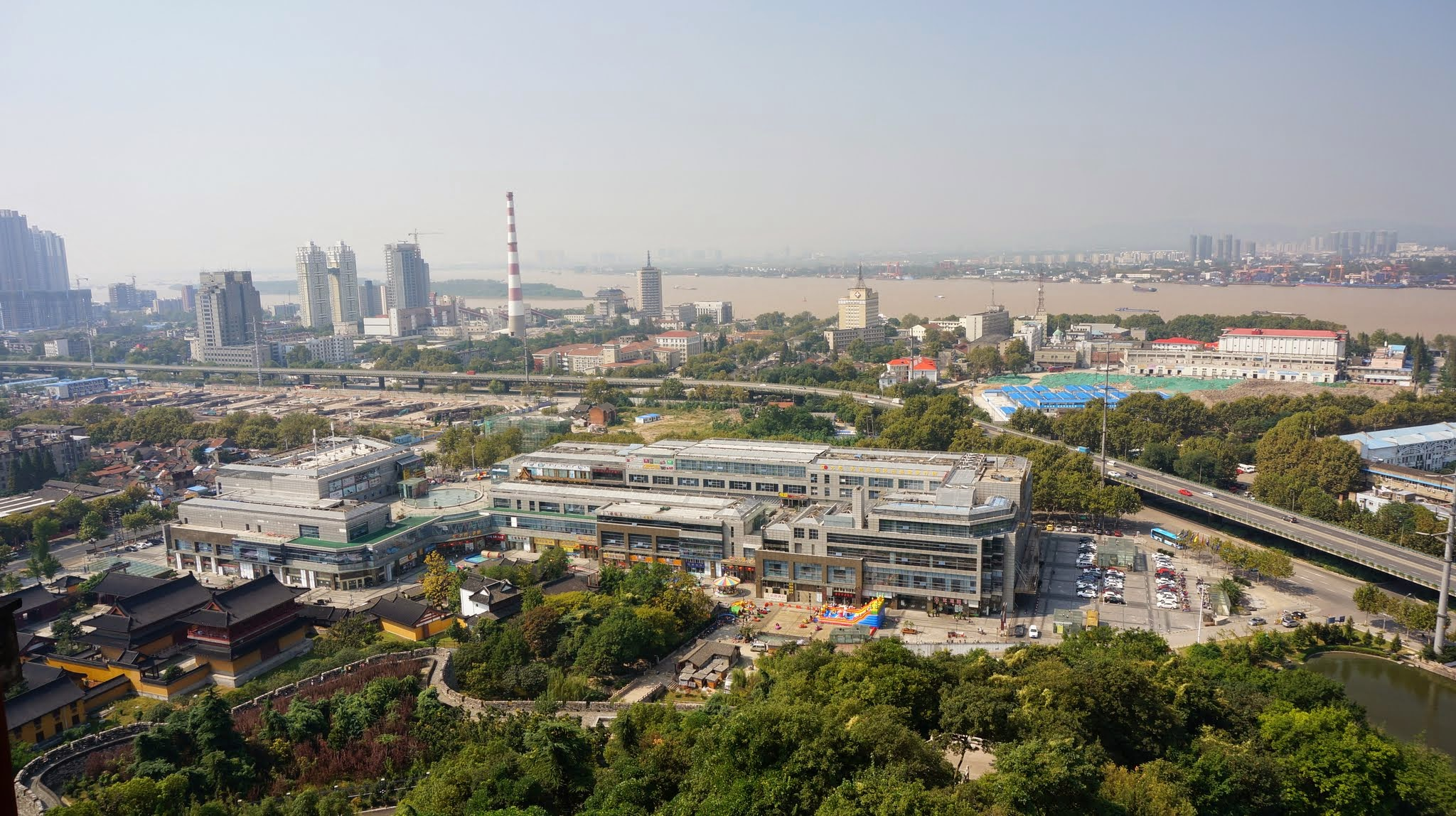

- Location in Jiangsu
- Coordinates: 32°03′50″N 118°45′05″E
- Country: People's Republic of China
- Province: Jiangsu
- Sub-provincial city: Nanjing

Area
  - Total: 54.18 km^{2} (20.92 sq mi)

Population (2018)
  - Total: 1,109,600
  - Density: 20,480/km^{2} (53,040/sq mi)
- Time zone: UTC+8 (China Standard)
- Postal code: 210003 - 210037
Nanjing district map
Subdivisions of Nanjing, Jiangsu
City Proper
1	Xuanwu
2	Qinhuai
3	Jianye
4	Gulou
5	Yuhuatai
6	Qixia
Suburban
7	Jiangning
8	Pukou
9	Luhe
Rural
10	Lishui
11	Gaochun

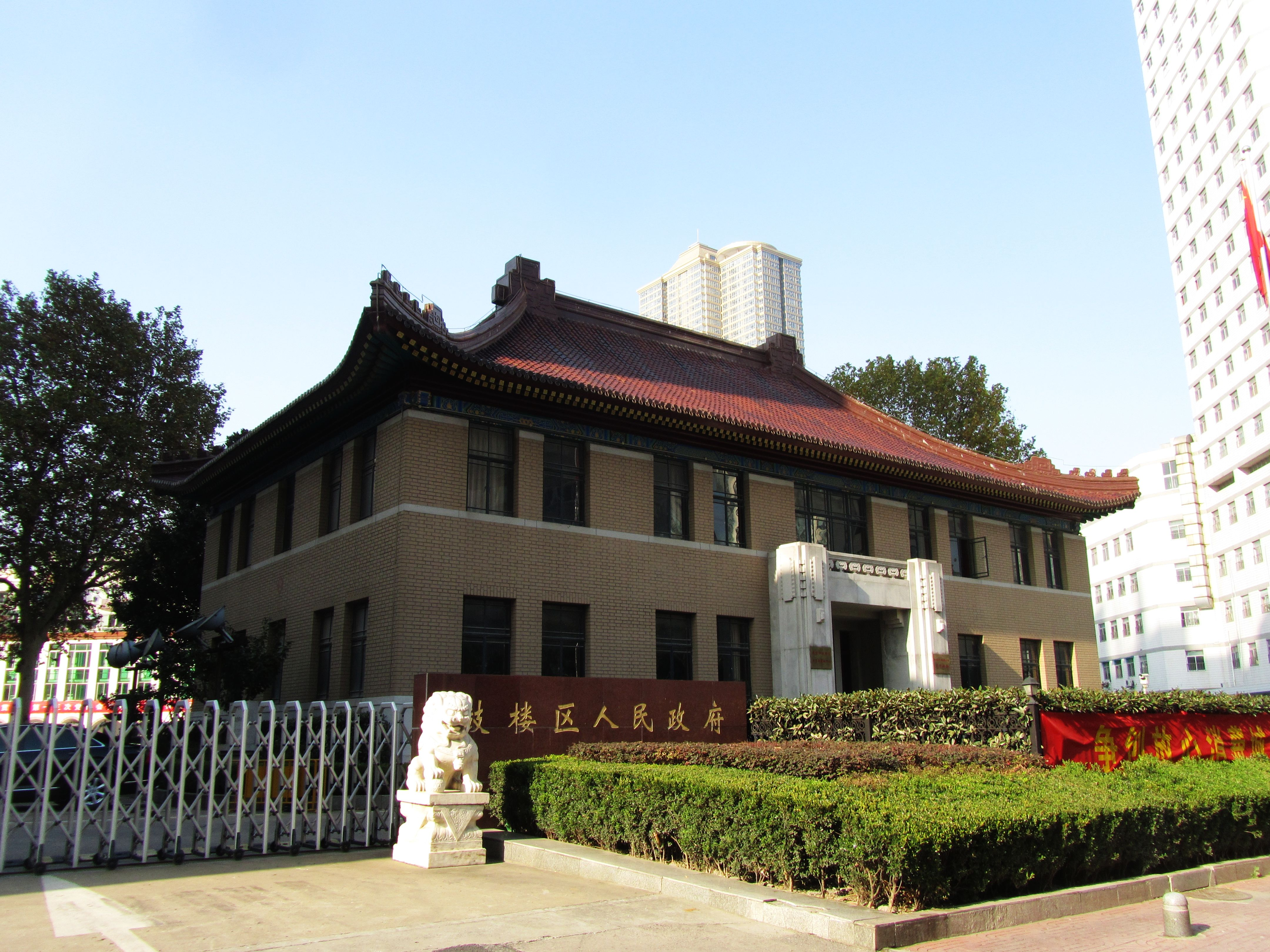
Gulou District government building

Gulou District (Chinese: 鼓楼区; pinyin: Gǔlóu Qū; lit. 'Drum tower') is one of 11 districts of Nanjing, the capital of Jiangsu province, China.

It is named after the Drum Tower of Nanjing (Gulou).

== Administrative subdivisions ==
Gulou has administrative jurisdiction to 13 subdistricts:

Name	Chinese (S)	Hanyu Pinyin	Population (2010)	Area (km^{2})
Ninghailu Subdistrict	宁海路街道	Nínghǎilù Jiēdào	119,506	3.68
Huaqiaolu Subdistrict	华侨路街道	Huáqiáolù Jiēdào	114,432	3.7
Hunanlu Subdistrict	湖南路街道	Húnánlù Jiēdào	122,324	2.62
Zhongyangmen Subdistrict	中央门街道	Zhōngyāngmén Jiēdào	149,878	3.37
Yijiangmen Subdistrict	挹江门街道	Yìjiāngmén Jiēdào	94,874	3.34
Jiangdong Subdistrict	江东街道	Jiāngdōng Jiēdào	109,810	5
Fenghuang Subdistrict	凤凰街道	Fènghuáng Jiēdào	115,250	3.85
Yuejianglou Subdistrict	阅江楼街道	Yuèjiānglóu Jiēdào	79,841	3.74
Rehenanlu Subdistrict	热河南路街道	Rèhénánlù Jiēdào	77,401	2.73
Mufushan Subdistrict	幕府山街道	Mùfǔshān Jiēdào	43,980	6.47
Jianninglu Subdistrict	建宁路街道	Jiànnínglù Jiēdào	61,720	2.4
Baotaqiao Subdistrict	宝塔桥街道	Bǎotǎqiáo Jiēdào	97,631	7.2
Xiaoshi Subdistrict	小市街道	Xiǎoshì Jiēdào	84,544	4.9

In 2013, Xiaguan merged into Gulou gaining six additional subdistricts.

== See also ==
- Hunan Road Commercial Street
- Wutaishan Sports Center
