= Bixi (disambiguation) =

Bixi is a tortoise-like animal in Chinese mythology.

Bixi may also refer to:

- Harvard Bixi, a sculpture in Cambridge, Massachusetts, United States
- PBSC Urban Solutions, a bicycle-sharing system developer and supplier who created the BIXI brand
  - Bixi (bicycle share system), in Montréal, Canada
  - Capital Bixi, Ottawa, Canada

== See also ==
- Bixie, a lion-like animal in Chinese mythology
