= Bixi =

Creature in Chinese mythology

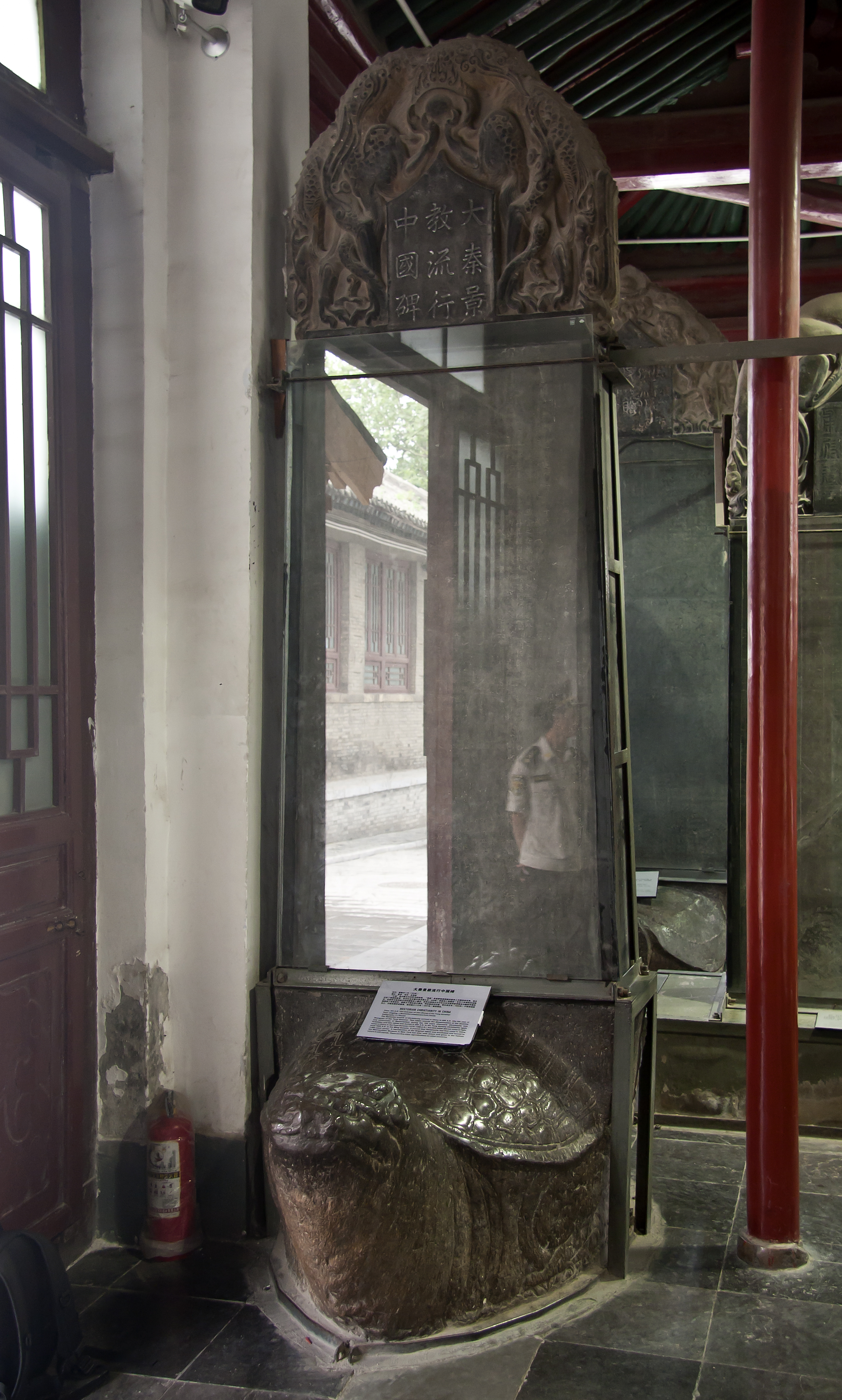
- The Xi'an Stele (781) is borne by a Bixi in the pedestal.

Chinese name
- Traditional Chinese: 贔屭, 贔屓
- Simplified Chinese: 赑屃
Transcriptions
Standard Mandarin
- Hanyu Pinyin: bìxì
- Wade–Giles: Pi-hsi
Yue: Cantonese
- Jyutping: bei6 hei3

Pa-hsia Dragon
- Chinese: 霸下
Transcriptions
Standard Mandarin
- Hanyu Pinyin: Bàxià
- Wade–Giles: Pa-hsia

guifu
- Traditional Chinese: 龜趺
- Simplified Chinese: 龟趺
- Literal meaning: turtle tablets
Transcriptions
Standard Mandarin
- Hanyu Pinyin: guīfū
- Wade–Giles: kuei-fu

Vietnamese name
- Vietnamese alphabet: Bí Hí; Bá Hạ rùa đội bia
- Chữ Hán: 贔屭 霸下
- Chữ Nôm: 𧒌隊碑

Korean name
- Hangul: 비희
- Hanja: 贔屭
Transcriptions
- Revised Romanization: Bihui
- McCune–Reischauer: Pihŭi

Japanese name
- Kanji: 贔屭
- Hiragana: ひき
Transcriptions
- Romanization: Hīki

Bixi, or Bi Xi (Wade–Giles: Pi-hsi), is a figure from Chinese mythology. One of the nine sons of the Dragon King, he is depicted as a dragon with the shell of a turtle. Stone sculptures of Bixi have been used in Chinese culture for centuries as a decorative plinth for commemorative steles and tablets, particularly in the funerary complexes of China's later emperors and to commemorate important events, such as an imperial visit or the anniversary of a World War II victory. They are also used at the bases of bridges and archways. Sculptures of Bixi are traditionally rubbed for good luck, which can cause conservation issues. They can be found throughout East Asia and the Russian Far East.

== History ==
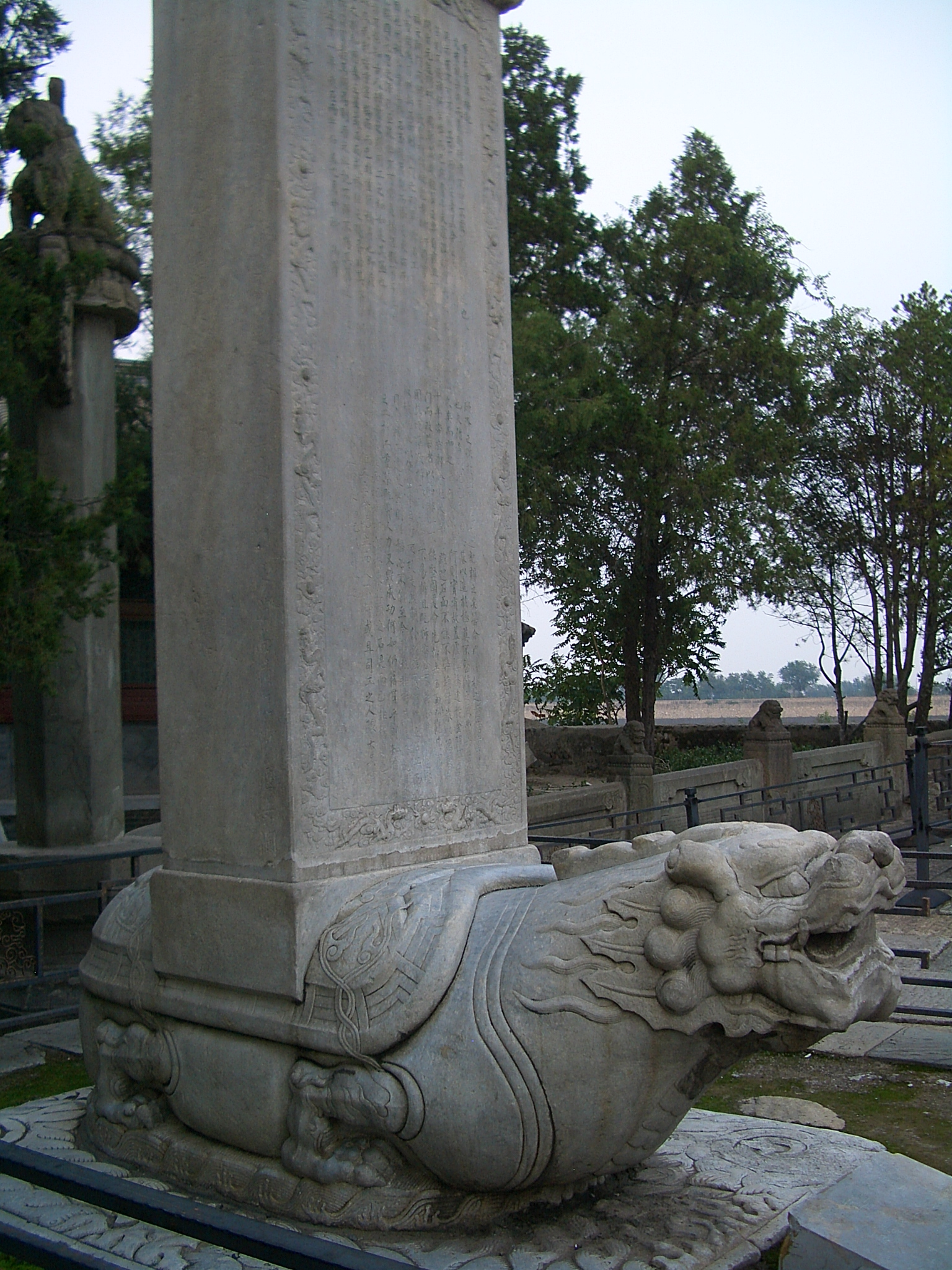
A dragon-headed bixi with a stele in memory of the Qianlong Emperor's rebuilding of the Marco Polo Bridge, Beijing, c. 1785

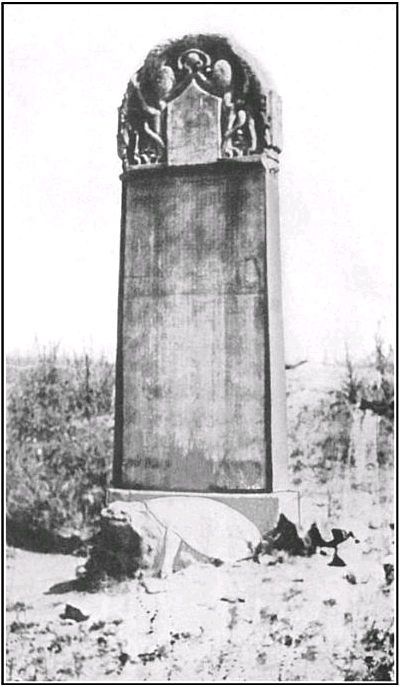
A bixi at the bottom of the Xi'an Stele

The tradition of tortoise-mounted stelae originated no later than early 3rd century (late Han dynasty). According to the 1957 survey by Chêng Tê-k'un (鄭徳坤), the earliest extant tortoise-borne stele is thought to be the one at the tomb of Fan Min (樊敏), in Lushan County, Ya'an, Sichuan. Victor Segalen had earlier identified the stele as a Han dynasty monument. Present-day authors agree, usually giving it the date of 205 AD. The stele has a rounded top with a dragon design in low relief - a precursor to the "two intertwined dragons" design that was very common on such steles even in the Ming and Qing Dynasties, over a thousand years later.

In the collection of the Nanjing Museum there is a hunping funerary jar, dating to 272 AD, with a miniature architectural composition on top, depicting, among other objects, a tortoise carrying a stele erected by the Jin dynasty governor of Changsha in honor of a local dignitary.

Perhaps the best known extant early example of the genre is the set of four stele-bearing tortoises at the mausoleum of Xiao Xiu (475-518), who was the younger brother of the first Liang dynasty emperor Wu (Xiao Yan), near Nanjing.

The bixi tradition flourished during the Ming and Qing dynasties. The Ming founder, the Hongwu Emperor, in the first year after the dynasty had been proclaimed (1368), adopted regulations, allowing tortoise-based funerary tablets to the higher ranks of the nobility and the mandarinate. He tightened the rules in 1396, leaving only the highest nobility (those of the gong and hou ranks) and the officials of the top 3 ranks eligible for bixi-based stelae. The type of dragons crowning the tortoise-born stele, and the type and number of other statuary at the tomb site, were prescribed by the same regulations as well.

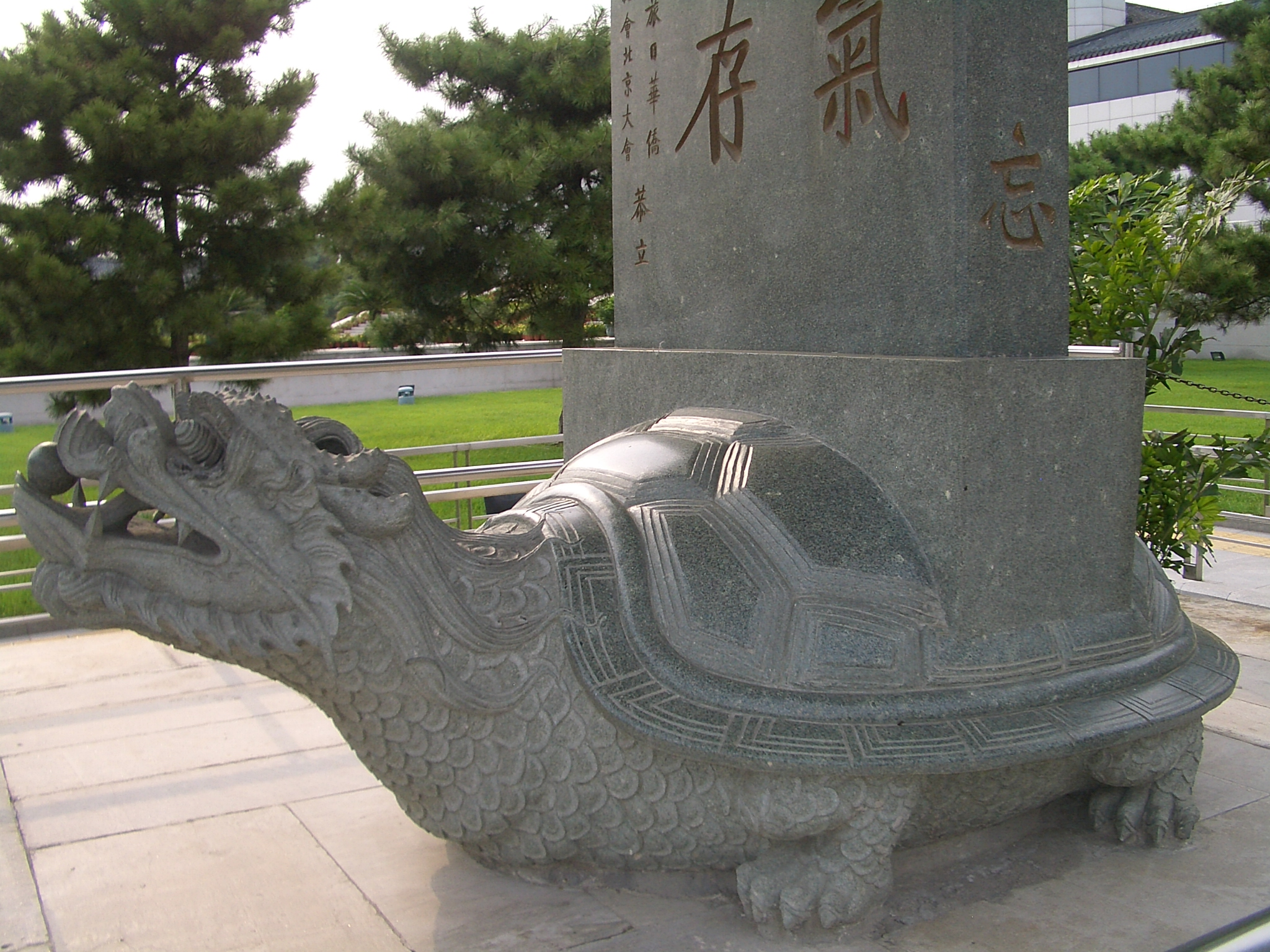
A modern (1995) monument in Beijing

At the Hongwu Emperor's own mausoleum, a huge bixi holding the so-called Shengde stele welcomes visitors at the Sifangcheng pavilion at the entrance of the mausoleum complex. Three centuries later (1699), the Kangxi Emperor of the Qing dynasty visited Nanjing and contributed another tortoise, with a stele praising the founder of the Ming, comparing him to the founders of the great Tang and Song dynasties of the past.

The Hongwu Emperor's tortoise tradition was continued by the later Ming and Qing emperors, whose mausoleums are usually decorated by bixi-born steles as well.

Even the self-declared emperor Yuan Shikai was posthumously honored with a bixi-based stele in Anyang, as was the Republic of China Premier Tan Yankai (1880–1930), whose stele near Nanjing's Linggu Temple had its inscription erased after the Communist Revolution.

Occasionally, a foreign head of state was honored with a bixi as well, as was the case for the sultan of Brunei Abdul Majid Hassan, who died during his visit to China in 1408. The sultan's grave, with a suitably royal bixi-based monument, was discovered in Yuhuatai District south of Nanjing in 1958.

After an ancient Christian stele was unearthed in Xi'an in 1625, it, too, was put on the back of a tortoise. In 1907, this so-called Xi'an Stele was moved to the Stele Forest Museum along with its tortoise.

These days, long-lost bixi continue to be unearthed during archaeological excavations and construction work. Among the most remarkable finds is the discovery of a huge 1200-year-old one in Zhengding (Hebei Province) in June 2006. The stone turtle is 8.4 m long, 3.2 m wide, and 2.6 m tall, and weighs 107 tons. It has since been moved to Zhengding's Kaiyuan Temple.

== Outside China ==
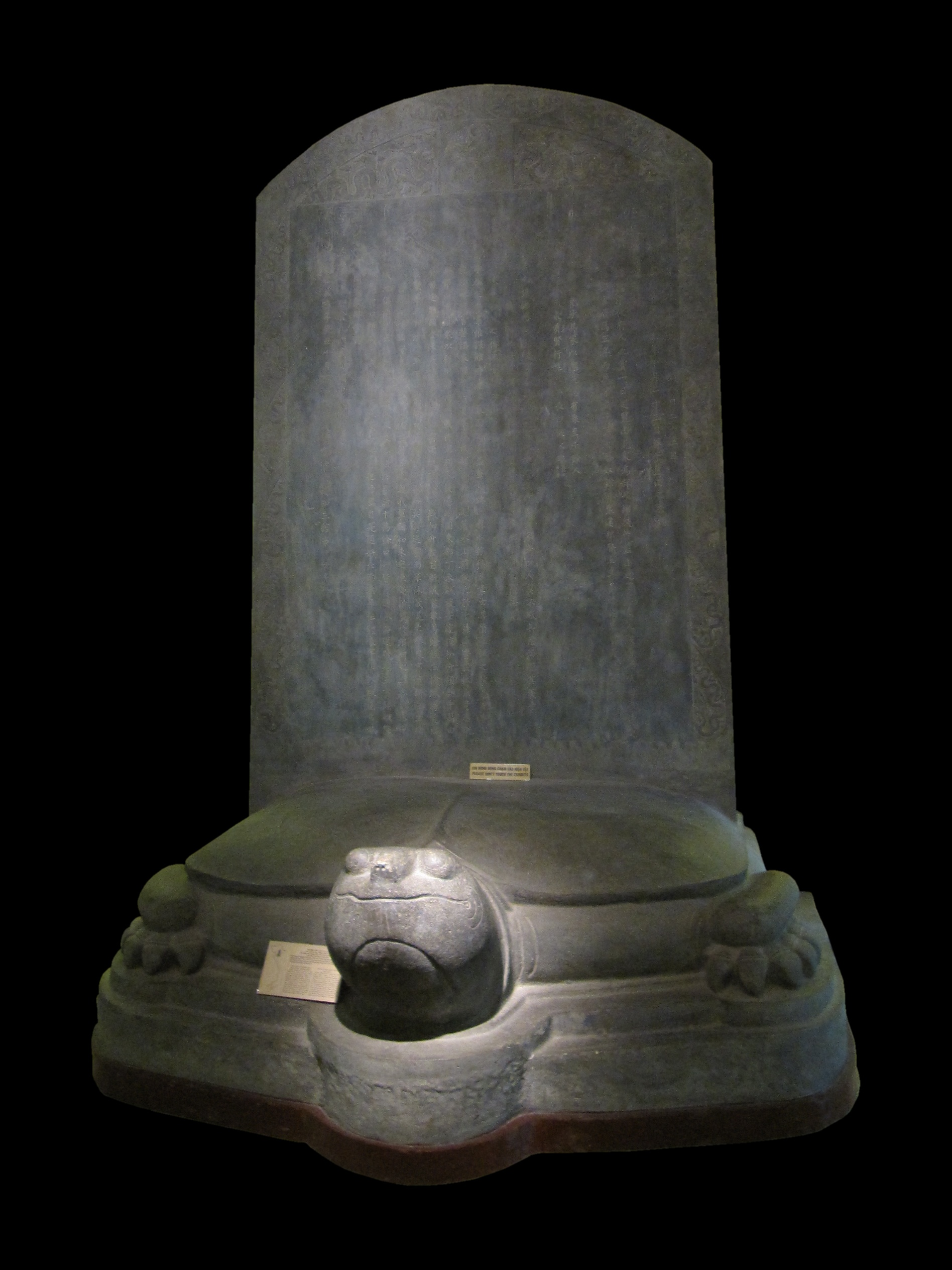
The Vĩnh Lăng stele from Lê Thái Tổ's mausoleum, erected in the 6th year of Thuận Thiên's reign (1433)

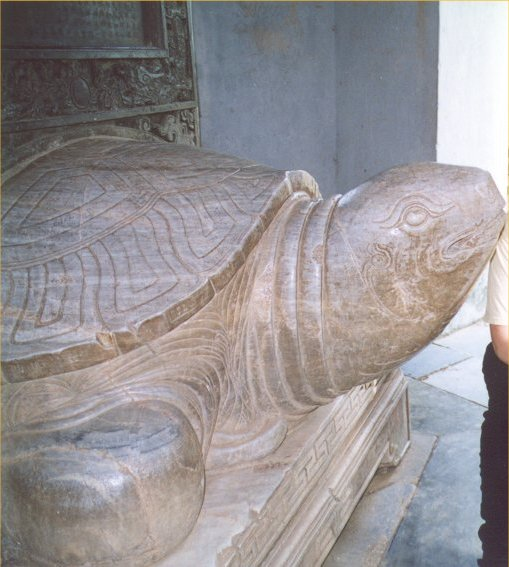
Turtle in Thiên Mụ Temple, Hue, Vietnam, 1715

The concept of a tortoise-borne, dragon-crowned stele was adopted early by China's northern neighbors. The earliest extant monument of the Turkic Kaganate - the so-called "Bugut Stele" of the late 6th century from Arkhangai Province in western Mongolia with a Sogdian and (most likely) Brahmi Mongolic inscription was installed on a stone tortoise. It is now in the provincial capital, Tsetserleg. According to the Turkish researcher Cengiz Alyilmaz, it was the design of this stele that influenced the builders of the important 8th-century stelae with Old Turkic inscriptions, many of which also stood on tortoises. Among them, the most accessible one is probably Bayanchur Khan's (Eletmish Bilge Kağan)'s Terhin-Gol stele (753 AD), now in the Mongolian Academy of Sciences in Ulan Bator.

Later, the Jurchen Jin dynasty (1115-1234) and the Mongol Yuan dynasty erected tortoise-based monuments as well, some of which have been preserved in Russia's Ussuriysk and Mongolia's Karakorum.

In Japan, this form of tortoise-supported stele is found primarily at the graves of prominent Kamakura period (1185–1333) figures, especially in the city of Kamakura. Another large collection of tortoise-borne stelae, spanning the 17th through 19th centuries, can be seen at the cemetery of the Tottori Domain daimyō outside Tottori. Otherwise, the form does not seem to have been particularly popular in earlier or later times.

In Korea, tortoise-borne stelae are known during the Three Kingdoms of Korea period (e.g., the Tombstone of King Muyeol of Silla, erected 661). Monuments of this type have been preserved from the later Goryeo dynasty as well, such as the Stele of Bongseon Honggyeongsa (1026).

Vietnam also has a long tradition of tortoise-born stelae, where they commemorate Emperor Lê Thái Tổ as well as the graduates of the Confucian academy at Hanoi's Temple of Literature.

While there is no indigenous tradition of erecting stelae on tortoise-shaped pedestals in the United States, a Qing period bixi can be seen on the campus of Harvard University in Cambridge, Massachusetts. This bixi was given as a gift to Harvard in 1936 by the members of Harvard Clubs in China; an appropriate text was carved for the occasion on the tablet carried by the tortoise.

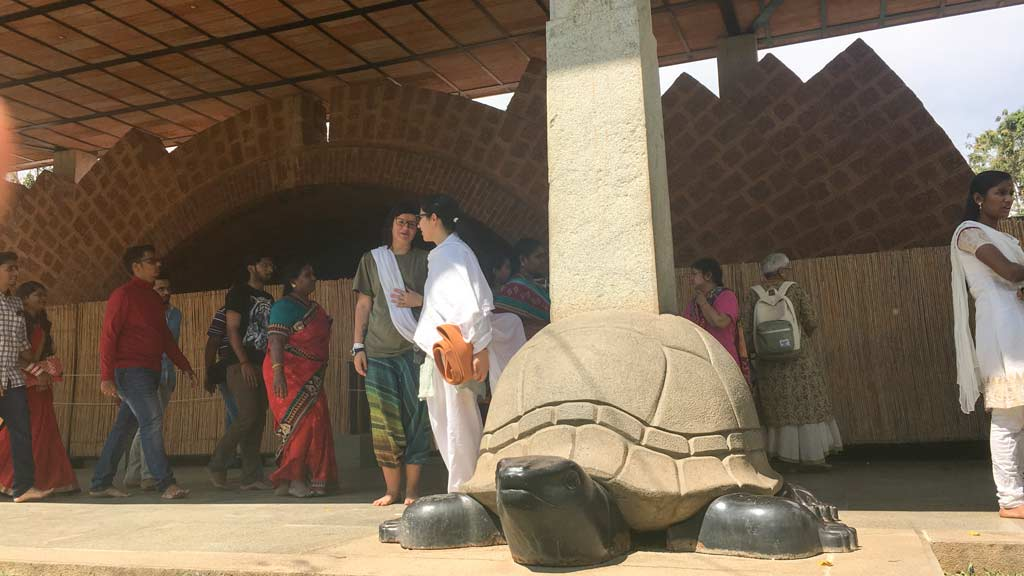
Tortoise pillar guarding the sacred waters of the Chandrakund at Isha Yoga Center

== Development as an art form ==
According to Victor Segalen's assessment, the early (Han and the Six Dynasties) stone tortoises were artistic images of quite real aquatic turtles. The creatures looked quite realistic through the Song dynasty, when huge tortoise pedestals, such as the ones in Shou Qiu near Qufu, or the one in Dai Miao at Mount Tai, were erected.

The early-Ming specimens, while still definitely chelonian, had sprouted small ears; the sides of their heads and their carapaces are often decorated by a leaf-like design. They usually have prominent teeth, which real-life turtles don't. By the mid-Qing (the 18th century), however, the stele-bearing tortoise becomes the characteristic dragon-headed bixi.

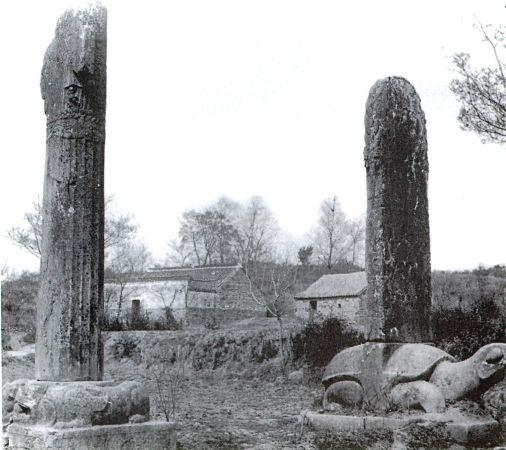
Xiao Xiu mausoleum, Nanjing, Liang dynasty, ca. 518. Photo by Victor Segalen

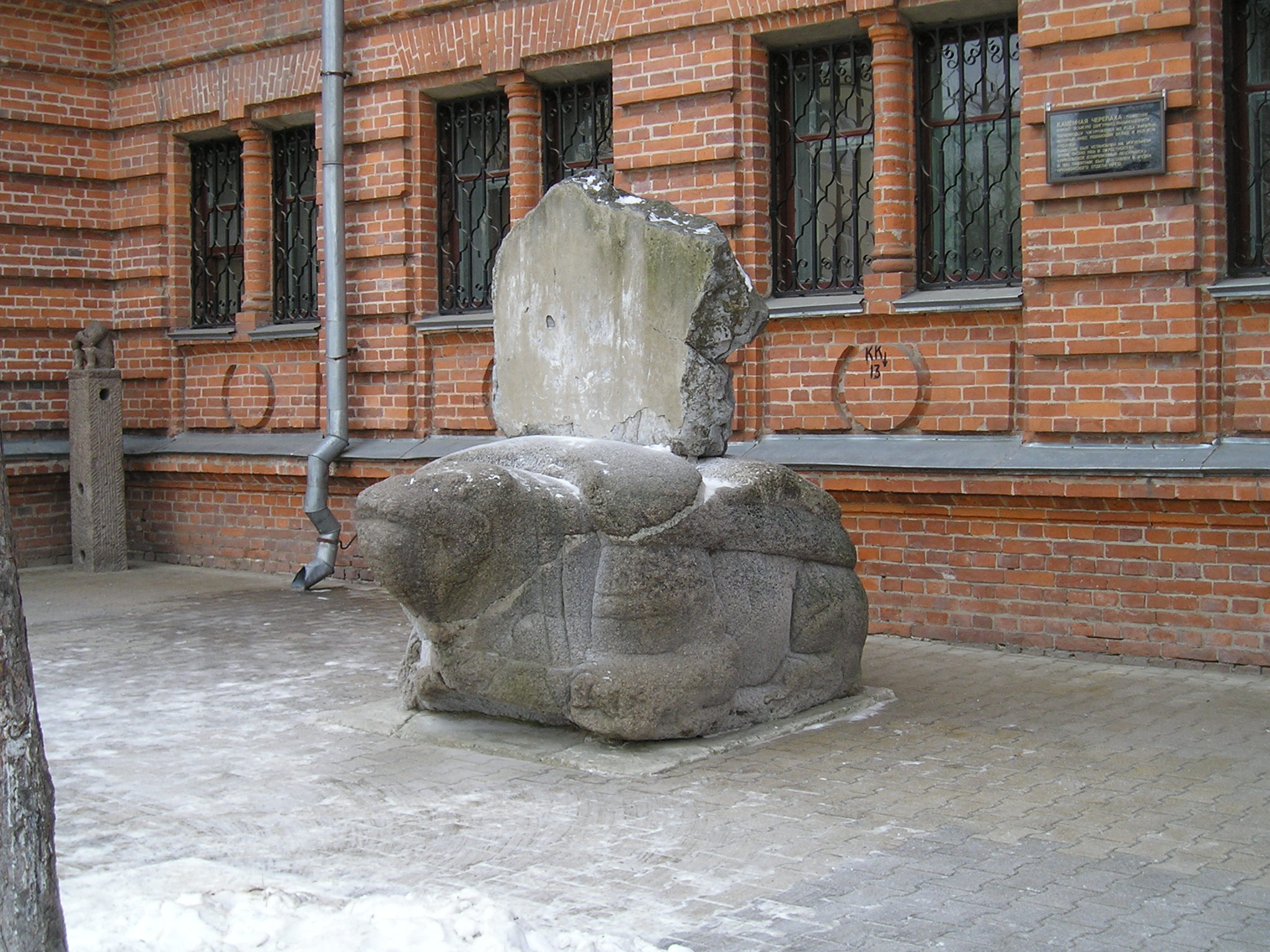
Tortoise from the grave of the Jurchen general Asikui. Originally near Ussuriysk, now in Khabarovsk Museum. Jin dynasty (1115-1234)

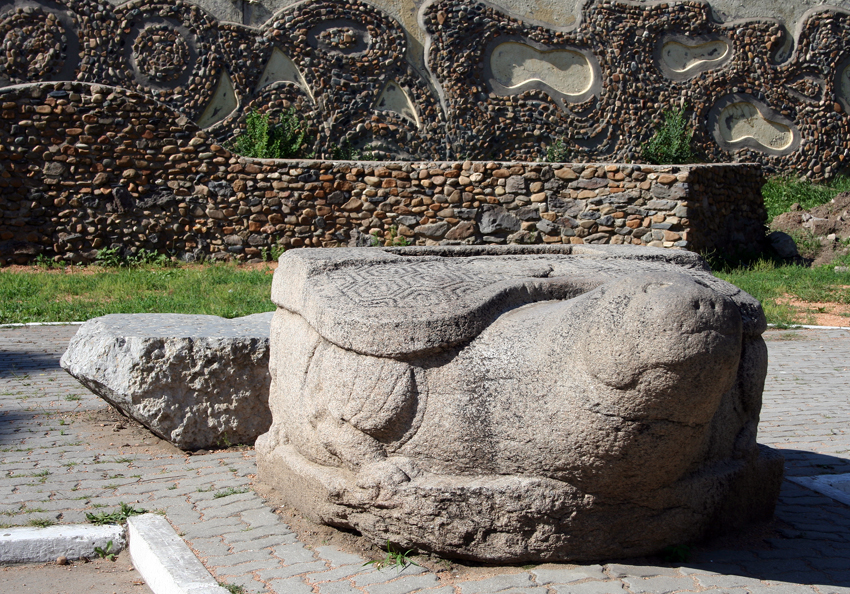
Ussuriysk, Jin dynasty (1115-1234)

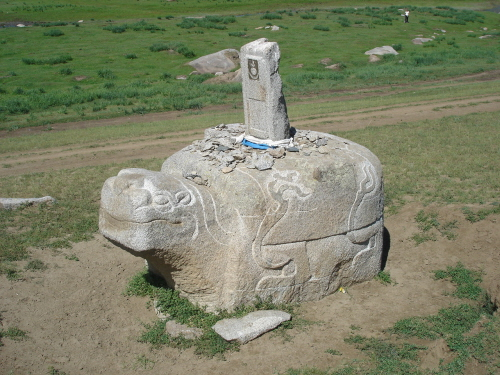
Karakorum ruins, Yuan dynasty (13th century)

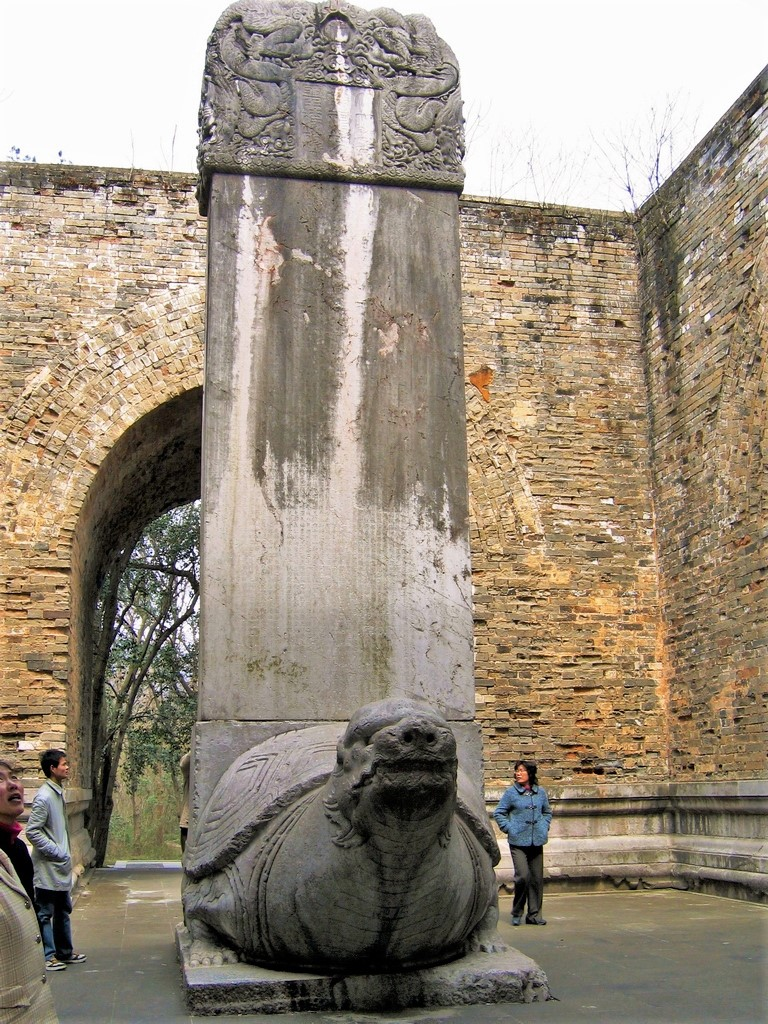
The Hongwu Emperor's mausoleum, Nanjing, ca. 1400

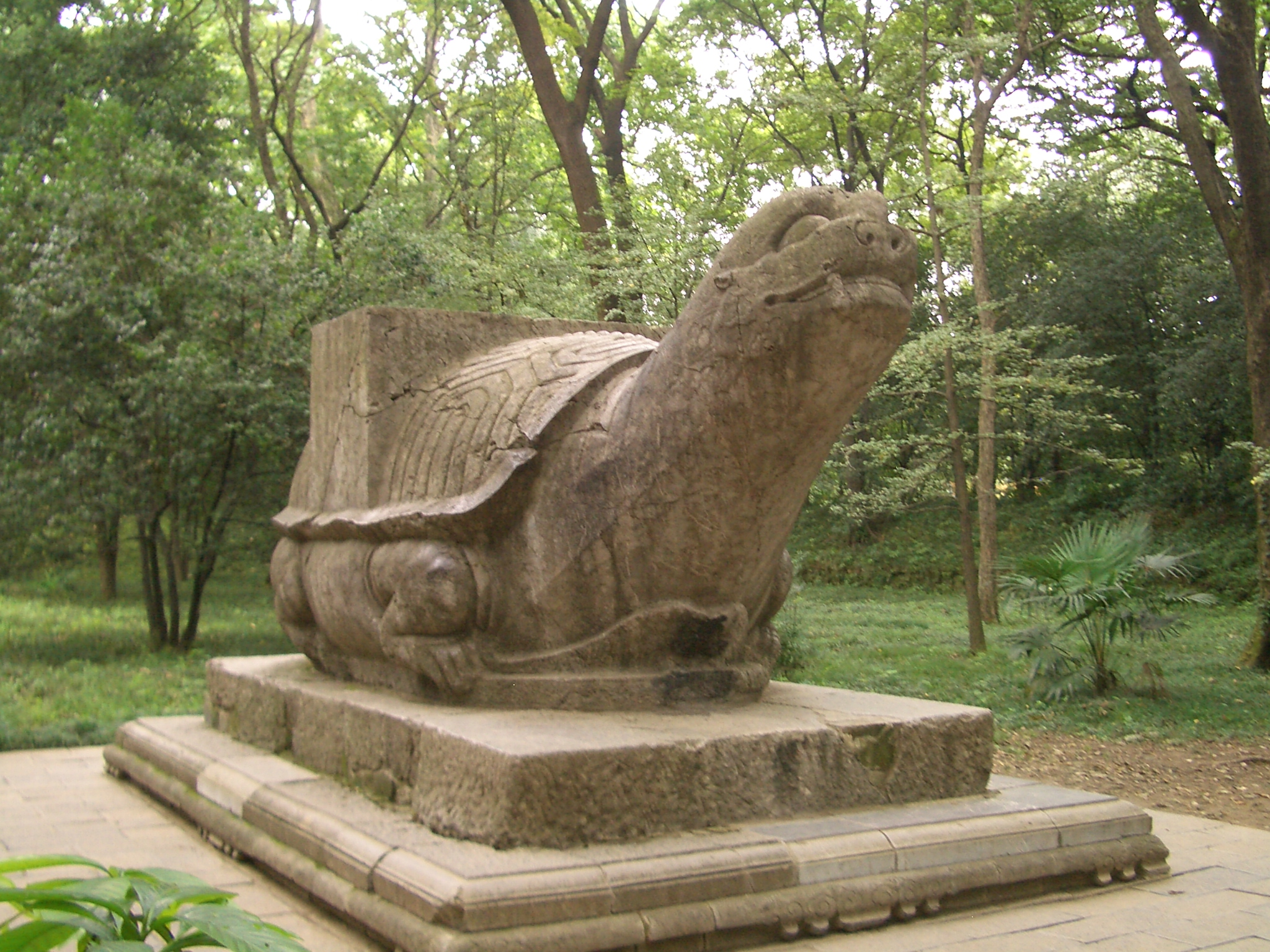
Near Linggu Temple, Nanjing, Ming dynasty

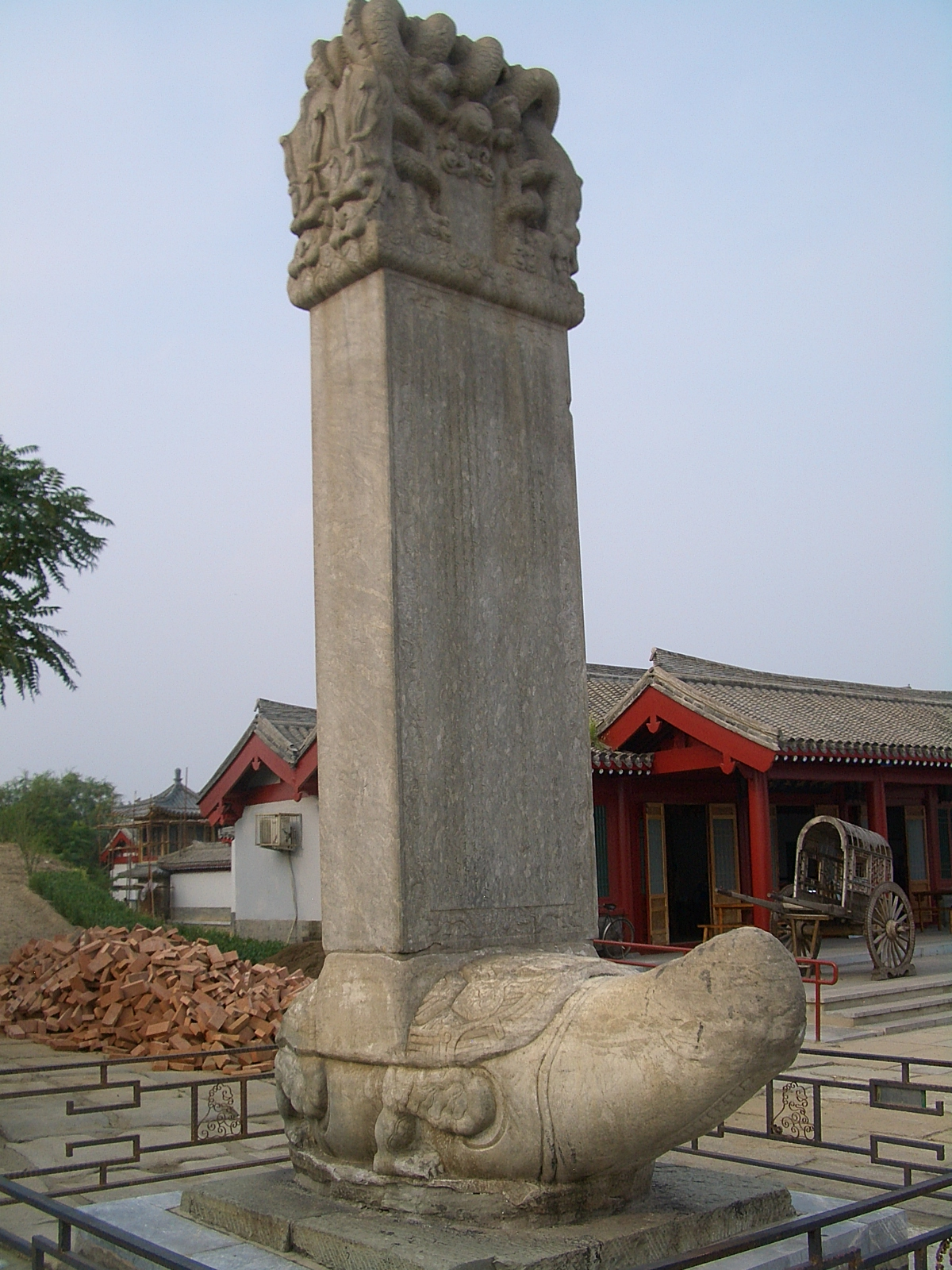
Stele in honor of the rebuilding of the Marco Polo Bridge by the Kangxi Emperor, Beijing, 1668

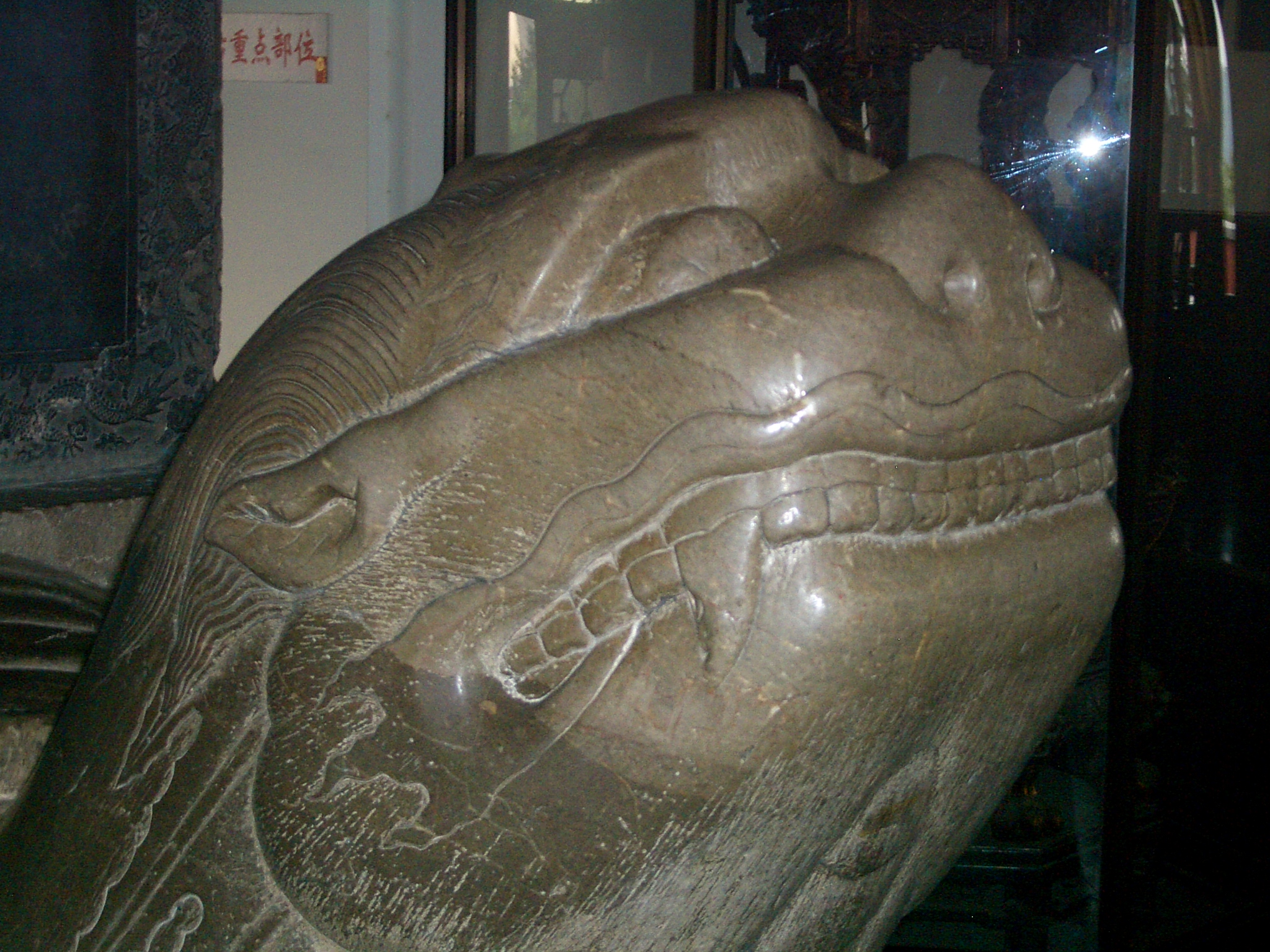
Drum Tower, Nanjing. Commemorates visit by the Kangxi Emperor, 1684

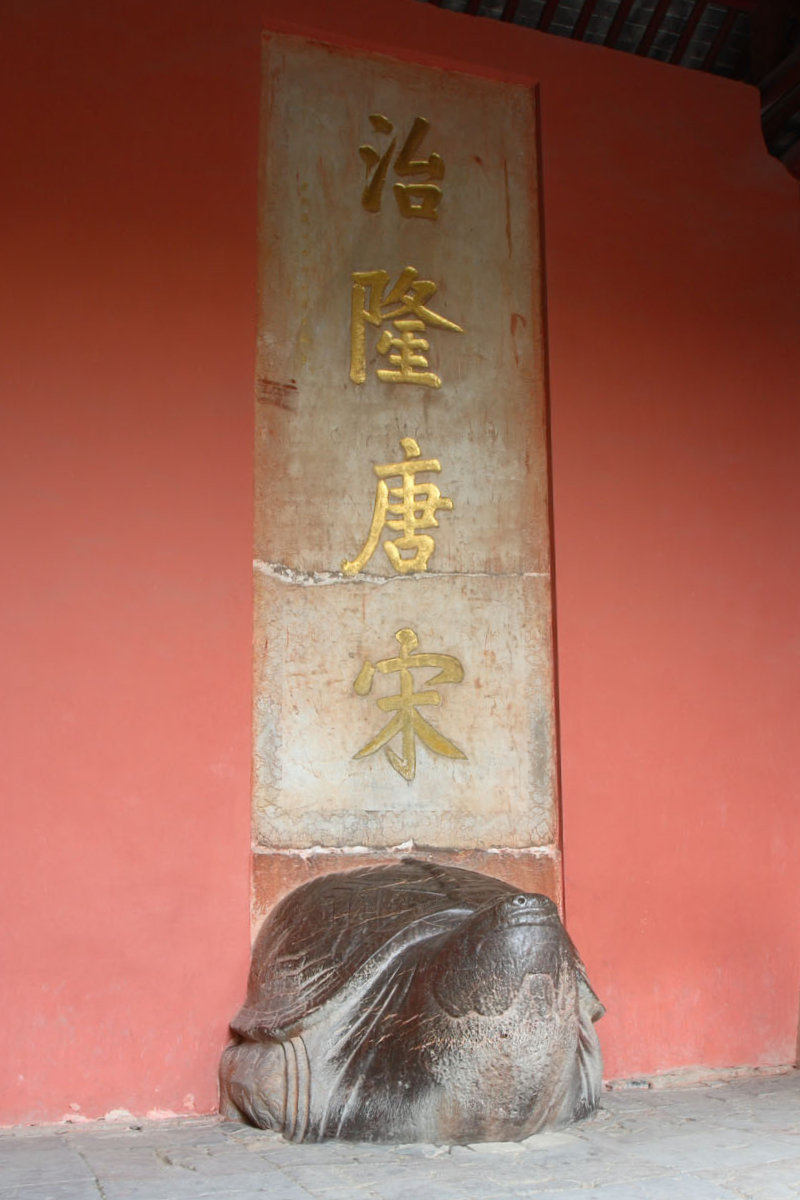
The Kangxi Emperor's stele at Ming Xiaoling Mausoleum, Nanjing 1699

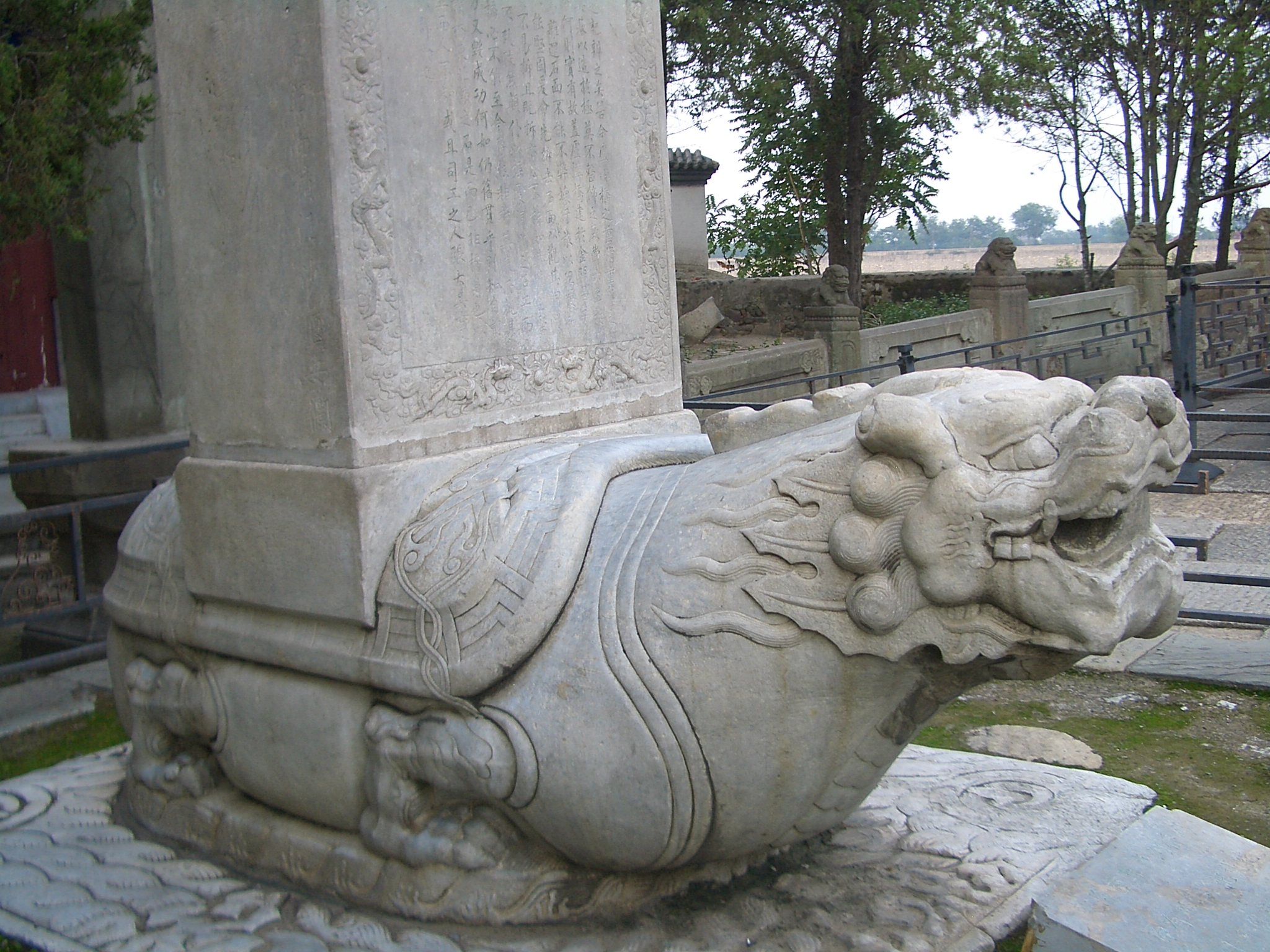
The Qianlong Emperor's Marco Polo Bridge rebuilding stele, Beijing, 1785

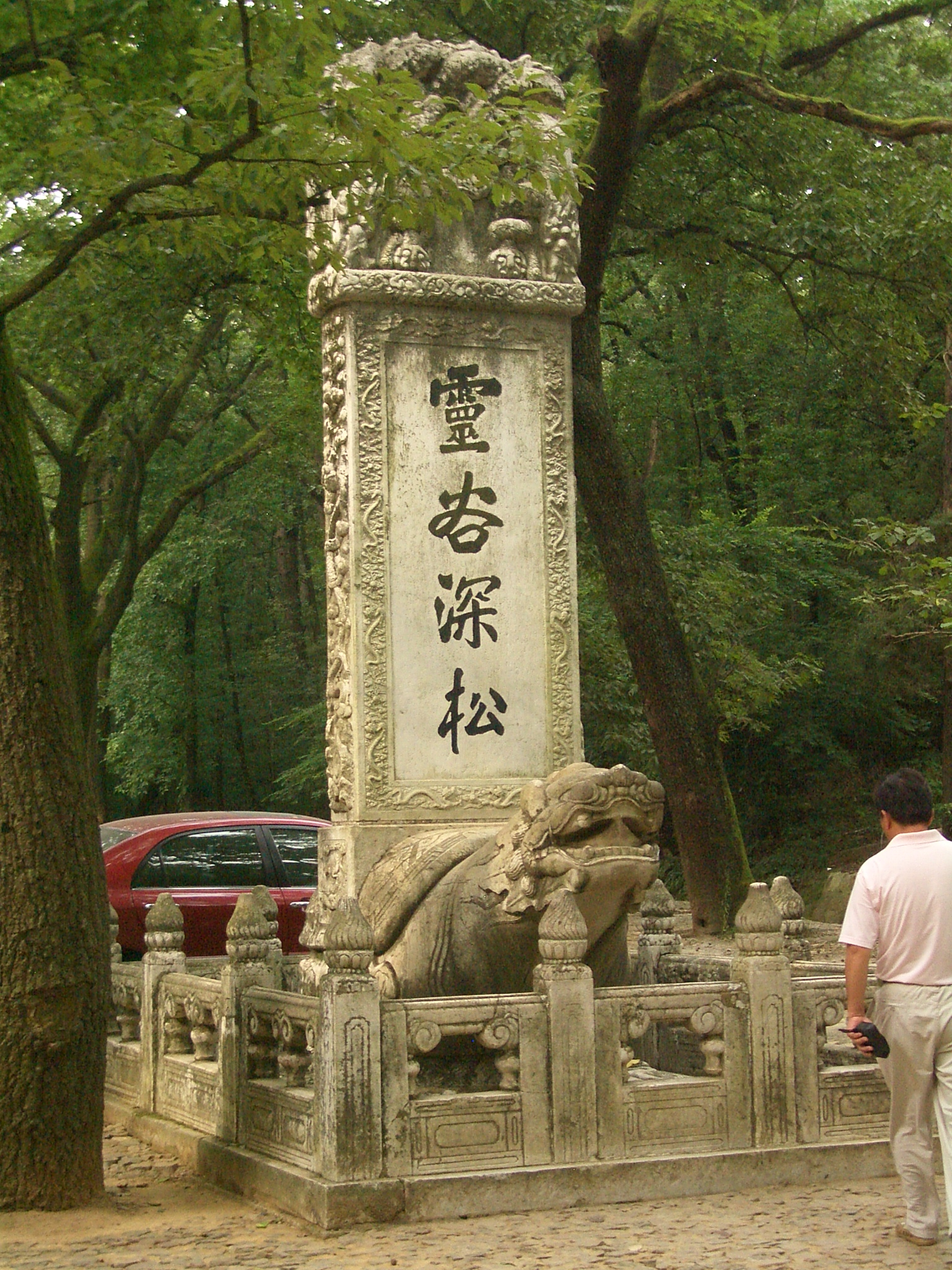
Tan Yankai tomb, near Linggu Temple, Nanjing, ca. 1930

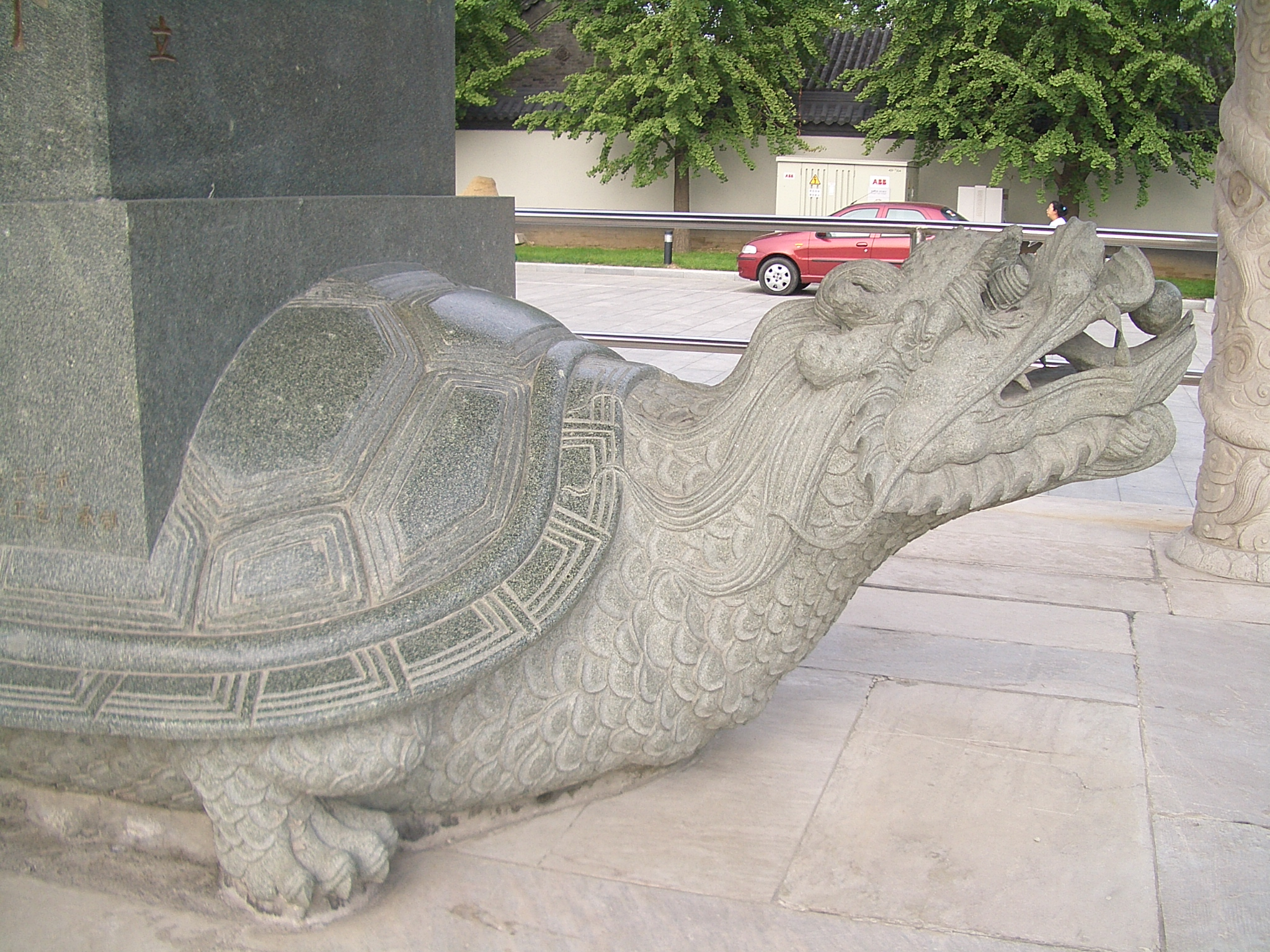
World War II monument in Wanping Castle, Beijing, 1995

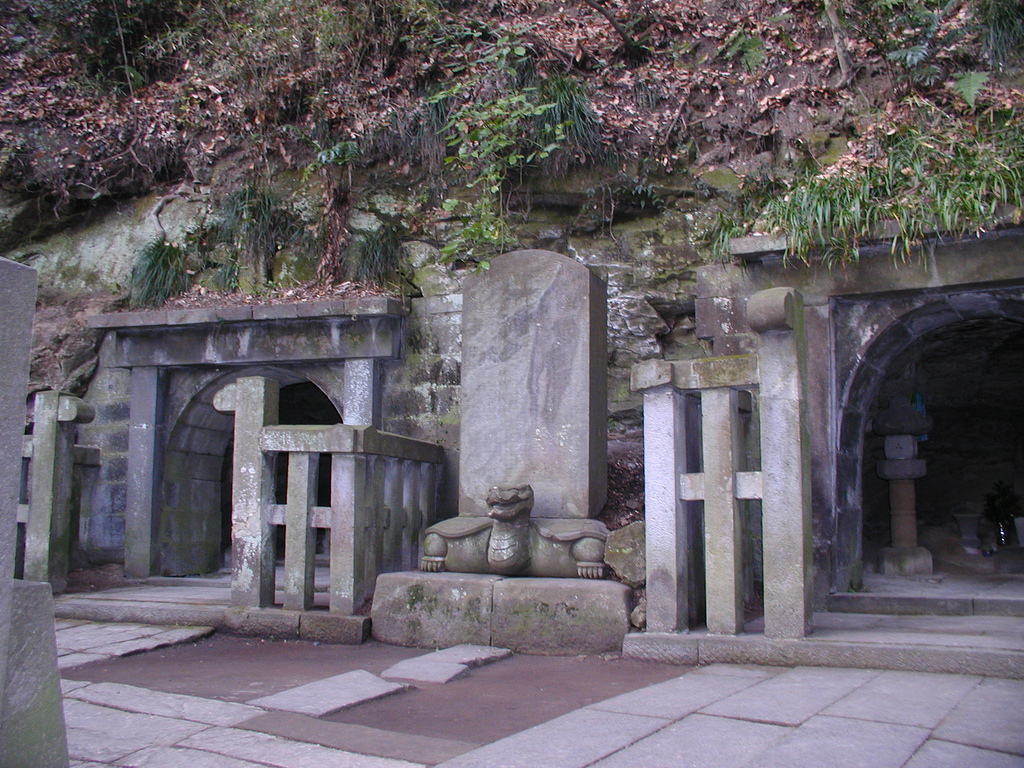
Gravesites of samurai Shimazu Tadahisa (d. 1227) and Mōri Suemitsu (1202-1247), the founders of the Shimazu and Mōri clans respectively, Kamakura, Japan.

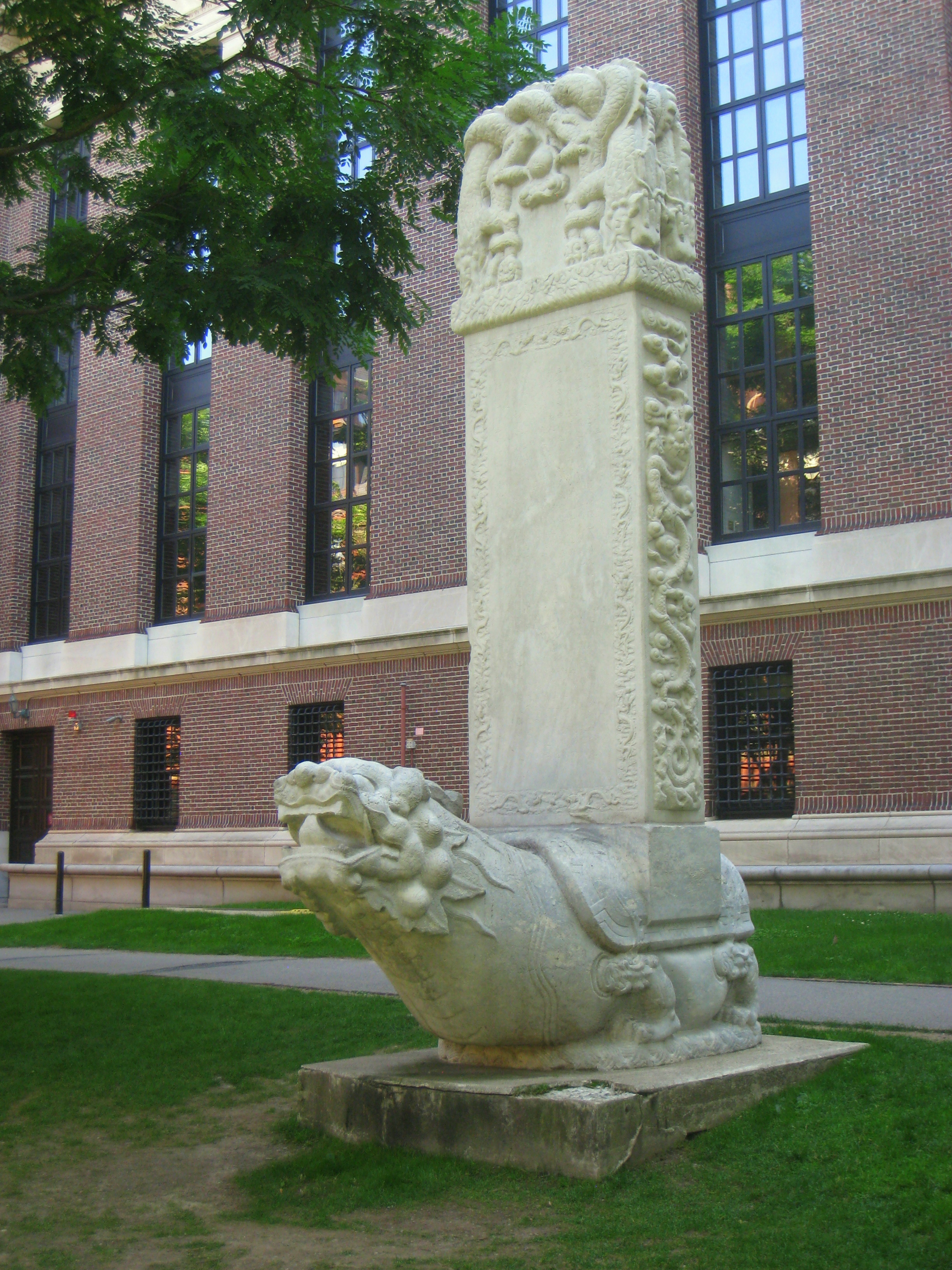
The Harvard Bixi in the United States was produced in China in the 18th century.

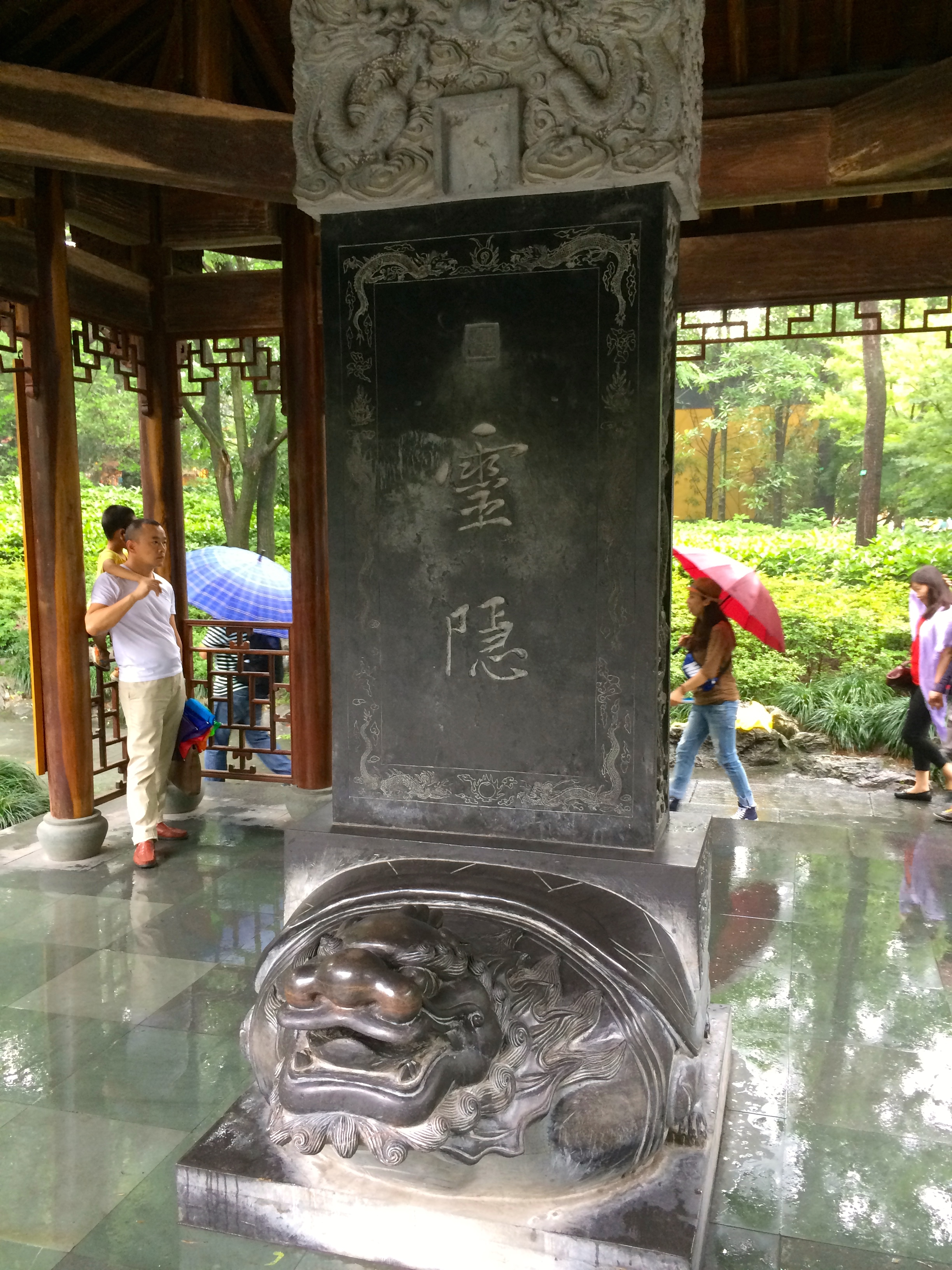
The bixi at Lingyin Temple, Hangzhou, with the characters "Lingyin" (靈隱) written on the stele.

According to some 19th-century western authors, the Chinese tradition of using a tortoise as a pedestal may have a common source with the Indian legend of the world being held up by a giant turtle.

== Name ==
The word bi 贔 or bixi 贔屭 (also written with a variant character, 贔屓) is translated by Chinese dictionaries as "strong", "capable to support great weight". The word bixi is attested already in Zhang Heng's (78-139) "Western Metropolis Rhapsody" (Xi Jing Fu), which mentions "the great strides" of the giant divine bixi. Zhang Heng's follower, Zuo Si (250–305), in his Wu Capital Rhapsody (Wu Jing Fu), explicitly associates the attribute bixi with the legendary giant turtle ao, whose head supports a sacred mountain.

The term bixi became associated with the stele-carrying tortoises no later than the Ming dynasty. The terminology, however, did not immediately become stable. The earliest known Ming-era list of fantastic creatures appearing in architecture and applied art is given by Lu Rong (1436–1494) in his Miscellaneous records from the bean garden (菽園雜記, Shuyuan zaji). The bixi, with the syllables swapped (屭贔, xibi), appears in the first position in that list:

The xibi looks like a tortoise. By its nature it likes to carry heavy weights. It used to be employed to support stone tablets.

Lu Rong claims that his list (including the total of 14 creatures) is based on the ancient books of beasts and supernatural creatures, the Shan Hai Jing and the Bo Wu Zhi (博物志); however, as the modern researchers Yang Jingrong and Liu Zhixiong note, that is not the case, and the names, much more likely, were taken by Lu Rong from the folklore of his time.

Soon after Lu Rong, the mighty tablet-carrying tortoise appears in various lists of the "Nine children of the Dragons", compiled by several Ming authors. However, both Li Dongyang (1441–1516), in his Huai Lu Tang Ji, and Xie Zhaozhe (謝肇淛, 1567–1624), in his Wu Za Zu (五雜俎, Five Assorted Offerings, ca. 1592), refer to the tortoise that carries the stele by the name baxia (霸下), rather than bixi; at the same time they apply the name bixi to the "literature-loving" dragons that appear on the sides of the stele:

The baxia has an innate love for carrying weights; the creature [that] now [is] under tablets is its image. ... The bixi has an innate love for literature; the dragons [that] now [are] on the sides of tablets are its image.

The name bixi, however, is given to the table-carrying tortoise in the more popular version of the list of the "Nine Children of the Dragon". In this form of the list, given e.g. by Yang Shen (1488–1559), the bixi is given the first position:

The bixi looks like a tortoise, and likes to carry heavy weights; [he] is the tortoise-carrier (guifu) now [seen] under stone tablets.

== Stone tortoises in art and popular lore ==
It is said that an old legend of the stone tortoise made by Lu Ban that went to swim in the ocean every summer, and came back to its seaside hill in the fall, inspired Lu Ji's lines:

The stone tortoise cherishes in its heart the love of the sea.
How can I forget my home village?

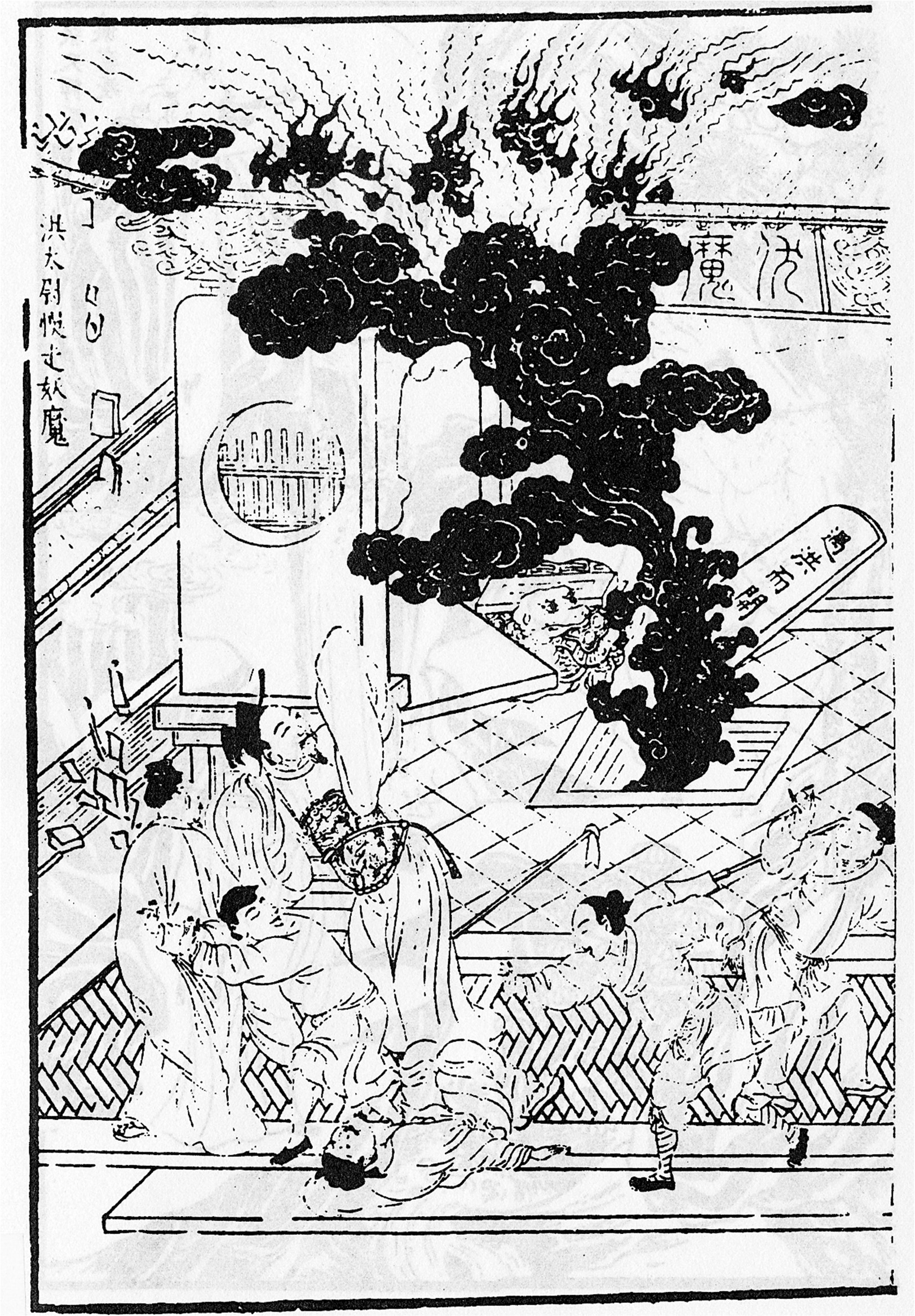
Marshal Hong releases demons by mistake, from the Rongyu Tang edition of the Water Margin

The opening chapter of the 14th-century novel Water Margin involves Marshal Hong releasing 108 spirits imprisoned under an ancient stele-bearing tortoise.

A bixi plays a key role in a ghost story, "The Spirit of the Stone Tortoise" (贔屭精, Bixi jing), from Yuan Mei's (1716–1797) collection What the Master Does Not Speak Of.

The French poet and researcher Victor Segalen (1878–1919), who published both a scholarly book about China's stelae and a book of poetry-in-prose about them, was also impressed by the "truly emblematic" stone tortoises, their "firm gestures and elegiac posture".

Today, the image of the bixi continues to inspire modern Chinese artists.

== Preservation concerns ==
As with other stone (particularly, marble and limestone) statuary, bixi turtles and their stelae are vulnerable to acid rain (or, in winter, acid snow). On the Harvard University campus, the curators of its turtle protect it against "acid snow" by wrapping it with a waterproof cover for the winter.

Physical contact by visitors seeking good luck has caused wear to the stone turtle sculptures (bixi) at Hanoi's Temple of Literature. In response to potential conservation concerns, site management has proposed landscaping modifications and physical barriers to restrict public access to the 82 monuments.

== See also ==
- Chinese dragon
- Turtle-shell tombs
