= Linggu Temple =

Buddhist temple in Nanjing, China

- 灵谷寺
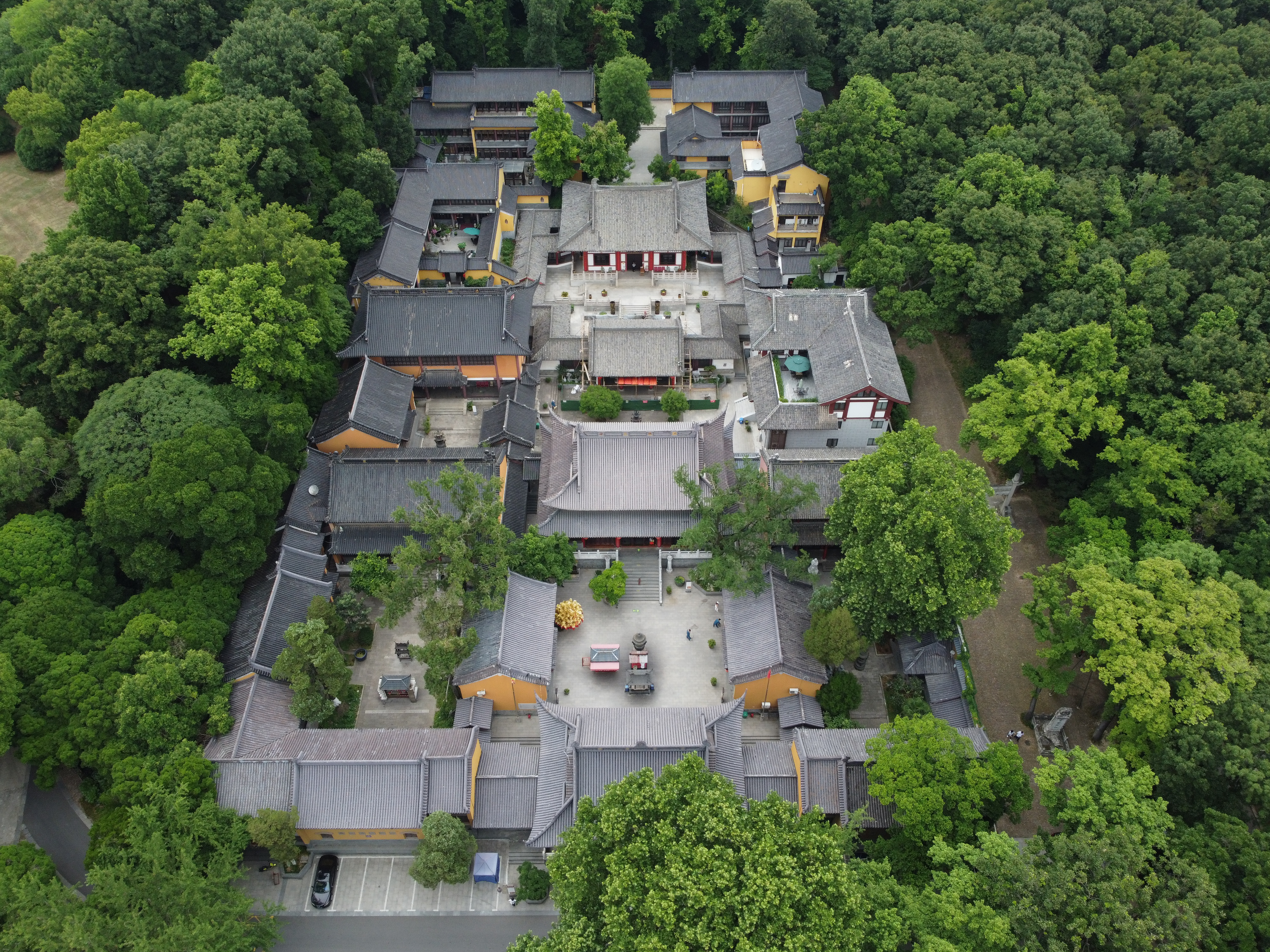
- Aerial view of the Linggu Temple by drone.

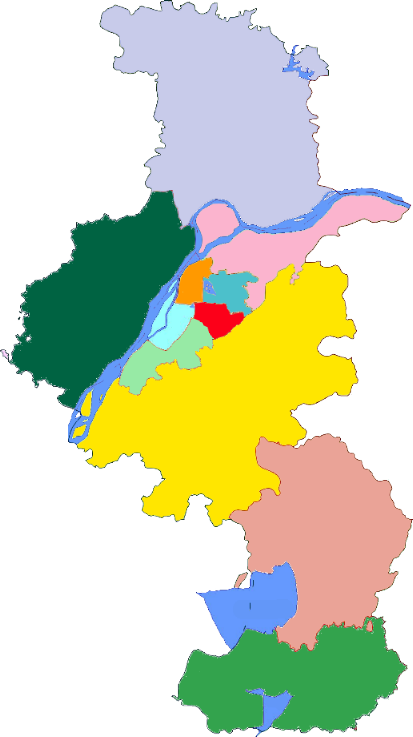
- Location in Nanjing

Religion
- Affiliation: Buddhism
- Sect: Chan Buddhism

Location
- Location: Xuanwu District, Nanjing, Jiangsu
- Country: China
- Coordinates: 32°03′18″N 118°52′04″E

Architecture
- Completed: 515; 1511 years ago

Linggu Temple (simplified Chinese: 灵谷寺; traditional Chinese: 靈谷寺; pinyin: Línggǔ Sì; lit. 'Spirit Valley Temple') is a famous Buddhist temple in Nanjing. It is now surrounded by a large park.

== History ==
The temple was first built in 515 during the Liang dynasty (502–557) of Southern Dynasties. It used to lie at the northeast foot of the Purple Mountain, i.e. where the Ming Xiaoling Mausoleum is located, since the Hongwu Emperor of the Ming dynasty (1368–1644) chose the place to be his mausoleum and then the temple was moved to the present place. The temple was named by the Hongwu Emperor himself. It used to be large and covered an area of over 300,000 square metres (3,200,000 sq ft). Later it was destroyed in warfare during the reign of the Xianfeng Emperor in the Qing dynasty (1644–1911) and rebuilt during the reign of the Tongzhi Emperor. In the temple, apart from shrines dedicated to Buddhas and Bodhisattvas, The relics of Master Xuanzang were enshrined and worshipped in the temple too.

Within the grounds are the tombs of Tan Yankai and Deng Yanda.

=== Wuliang Hall ===
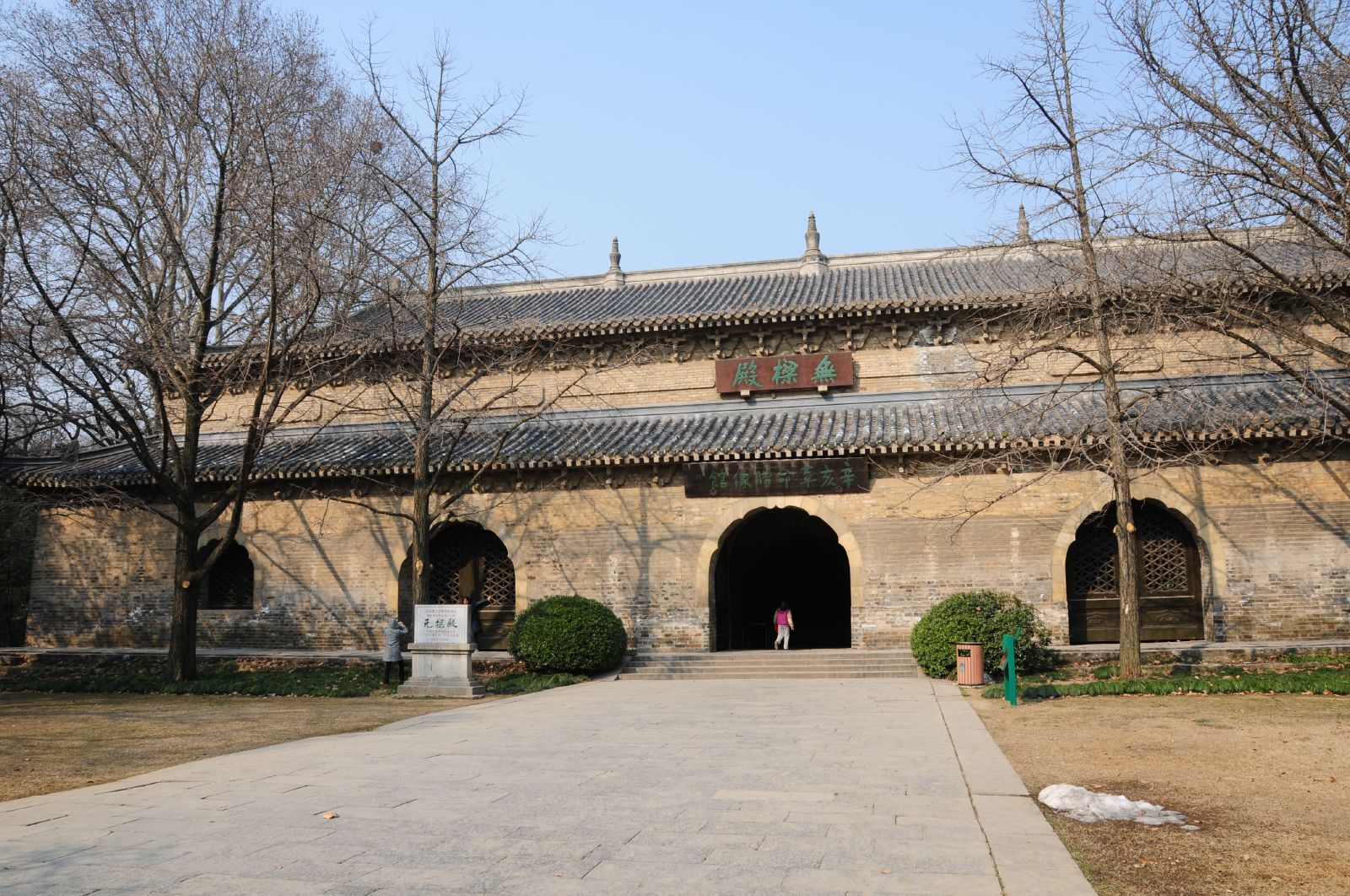
Beamless Hall

Wuliang Hall, or Beamless Hall, was constructed in 1381, and is 22 metres (72 ft) high and 53.8 metres (177 ft) wide. The hall enjoys high reputation for its special architectural techniques. It has three archways on the front and rear sides respectively. The structure was built with bricks from the bottom to the top entirely, without a piece of wood or a single nail. Thus it was called Wuliang Hall, since Wuliang means beamless. It happens that the hall originally enshrined Amitābha (the Buddha of Infinite Light) whose Chinese name is similar to "Wuliang". Later in 1928, the hall was turned into a memorial hall for soldiers who lost their lives in the Northern Expedition (1926–1928). More than 30,000 soldiers were enshrined.

=== Linggu Pagoda ===
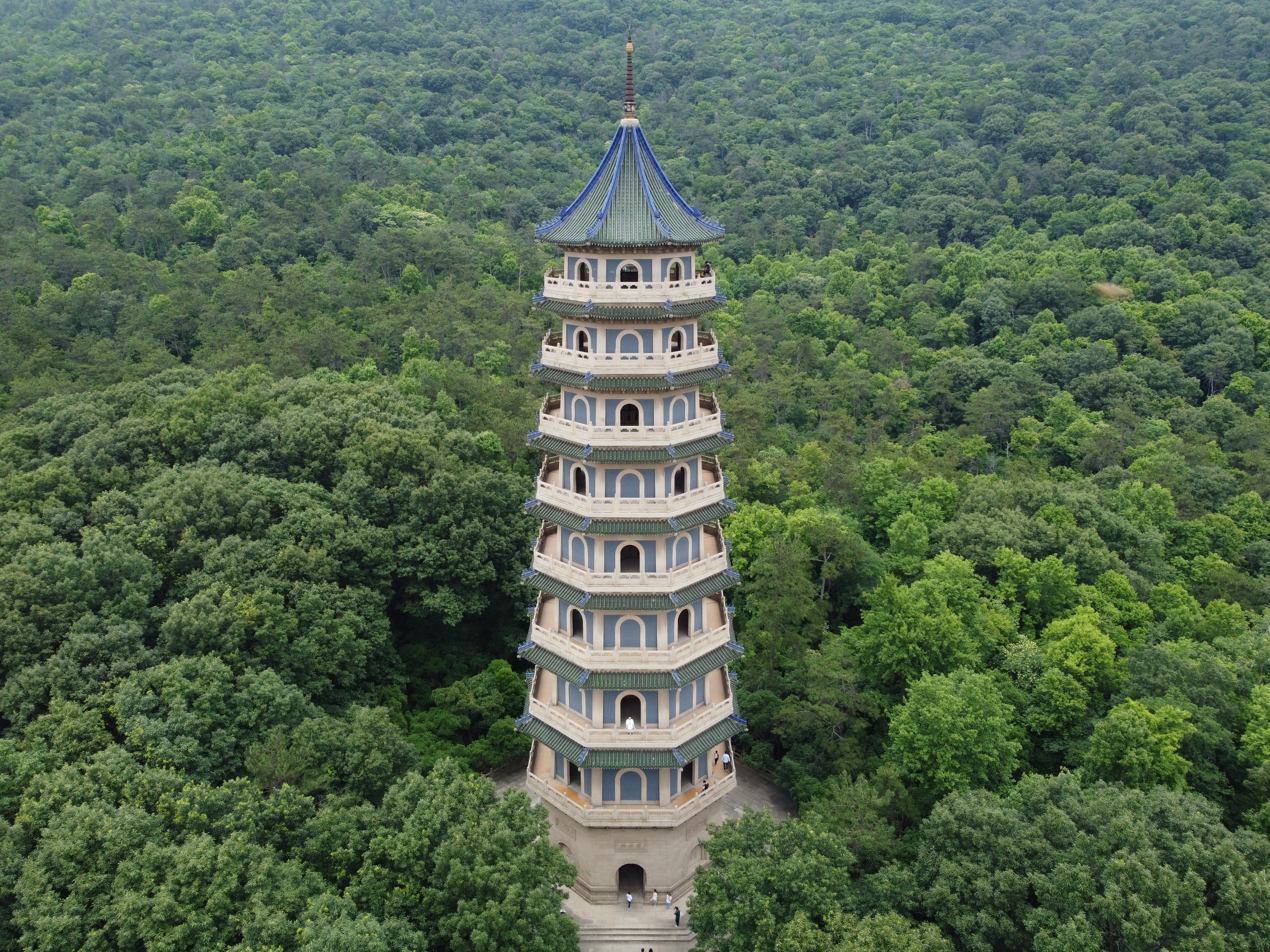
Linggu Pagoda was built in 1930–32 to commemorate the soldiers who lost their lives during the Northern Expedition.

Linggu Pagoda is not connected with the temple, but was designed by American architect Henry K Murphy and built between 1930 and 1932 as a sign of remembrance for the soldiers. The nine-story-tall pagoda stands 60.5 metres (198 ft) high. Speeches made by Sun Yat-sen and epigraphs of Chiang Kai-shek were inscribed on the tower.

In the temple, there is also a Three Superb Tablet, on which a painting of Baozhi painted by Wu Daozi, a famous painter; a memorial poem written by Li Bai, a Tang dynasty poet; calligraphy written by Yan Zhenqing, a well-known Tang dynasty calligrapher, is inscribed. Since the three were all masters in their own field in the Tang dynasty, the tablet was considered Three Superb Tablet. Unfortunately, the original tablet was broken in warfare, the present one is a duplicate made during the reign of the Qianlong Emperor of the Qing dynasty.

== Artistic depictions of Linggu Monastery ==
The Linggu Monastery is shown on Tshurpu Scroll which the Yongle Emperor commissioned in 1407.

== Gallery ==
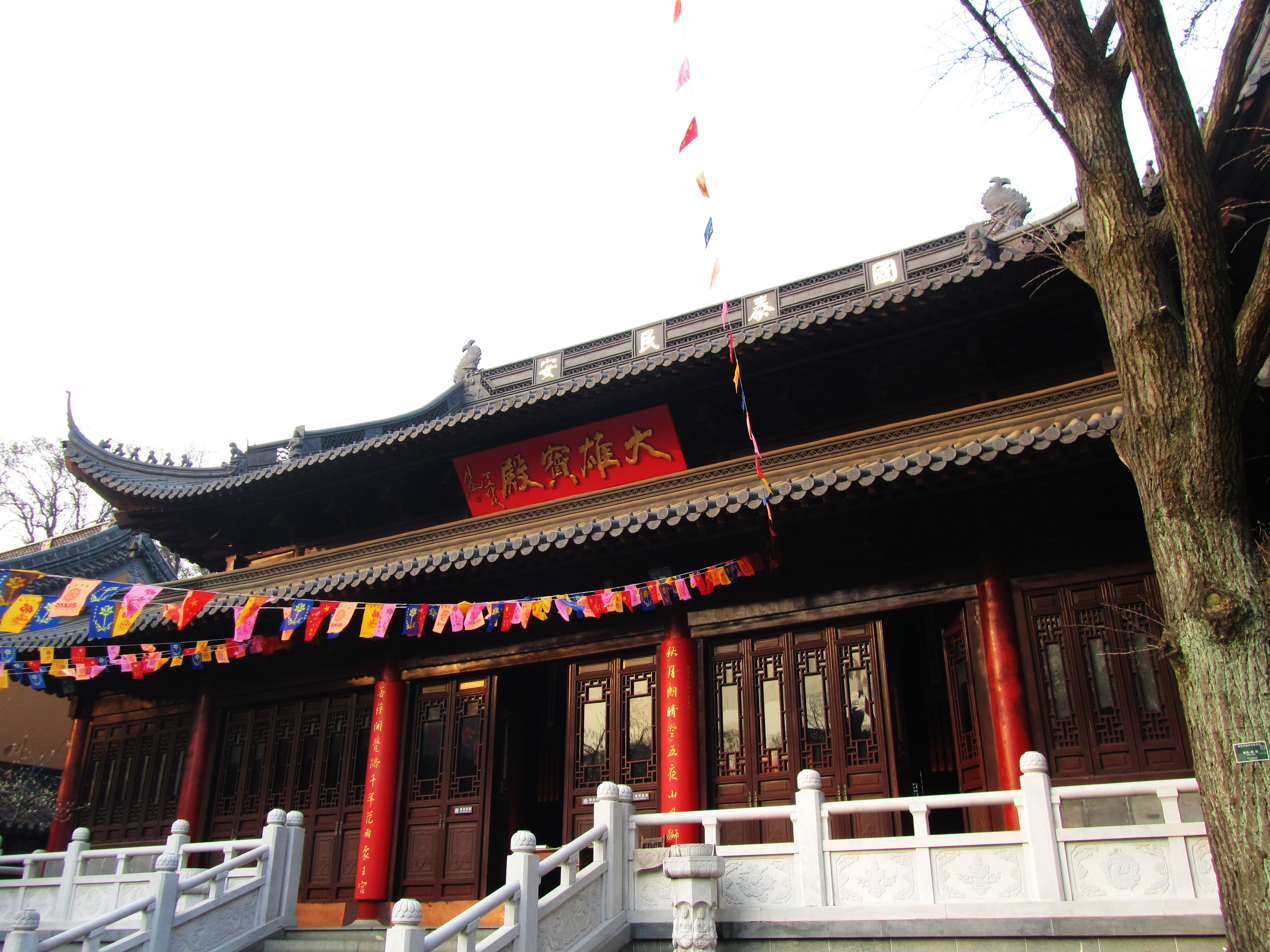
Linggu Temple

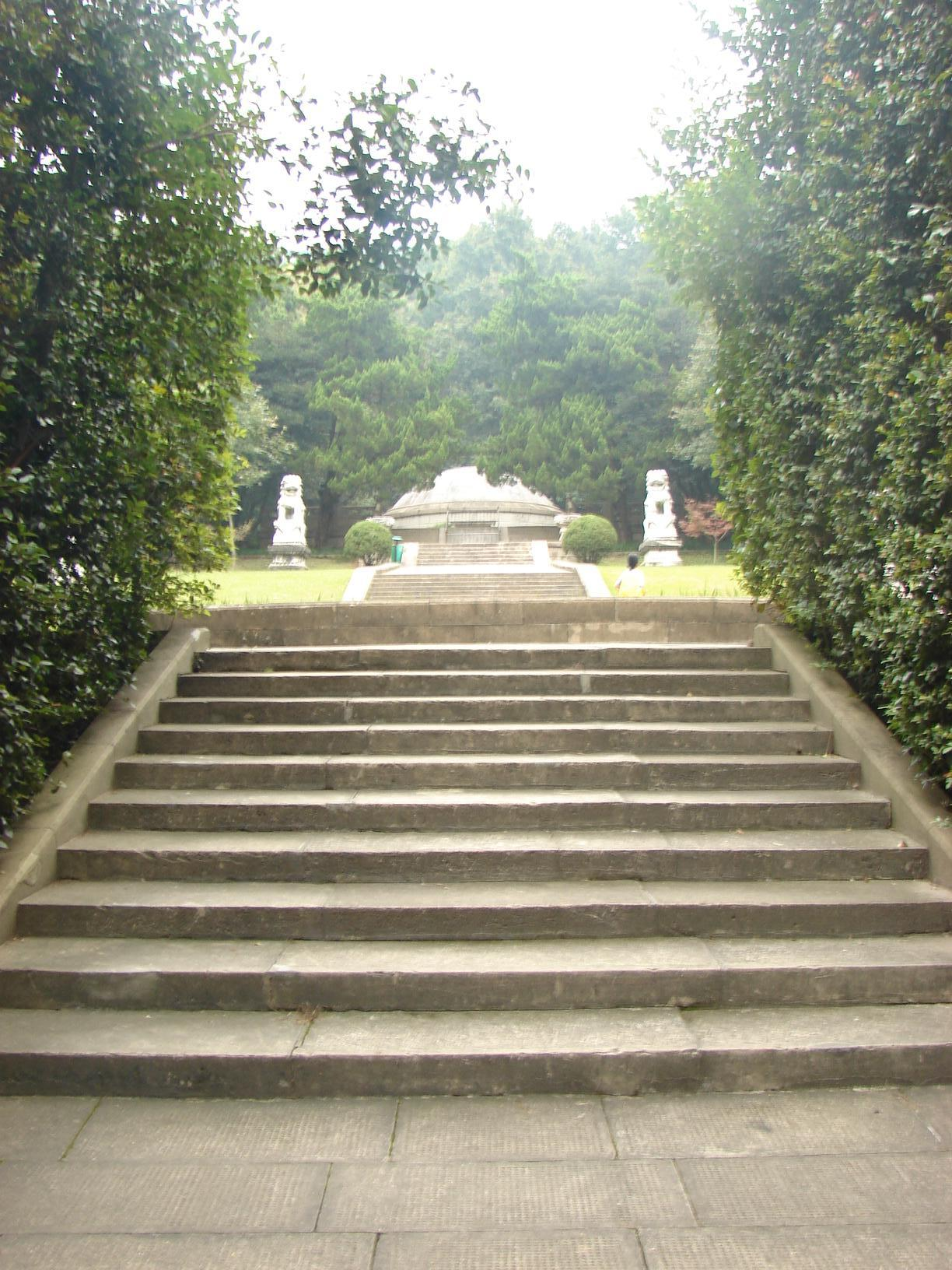
Tomb of Tan Yankai

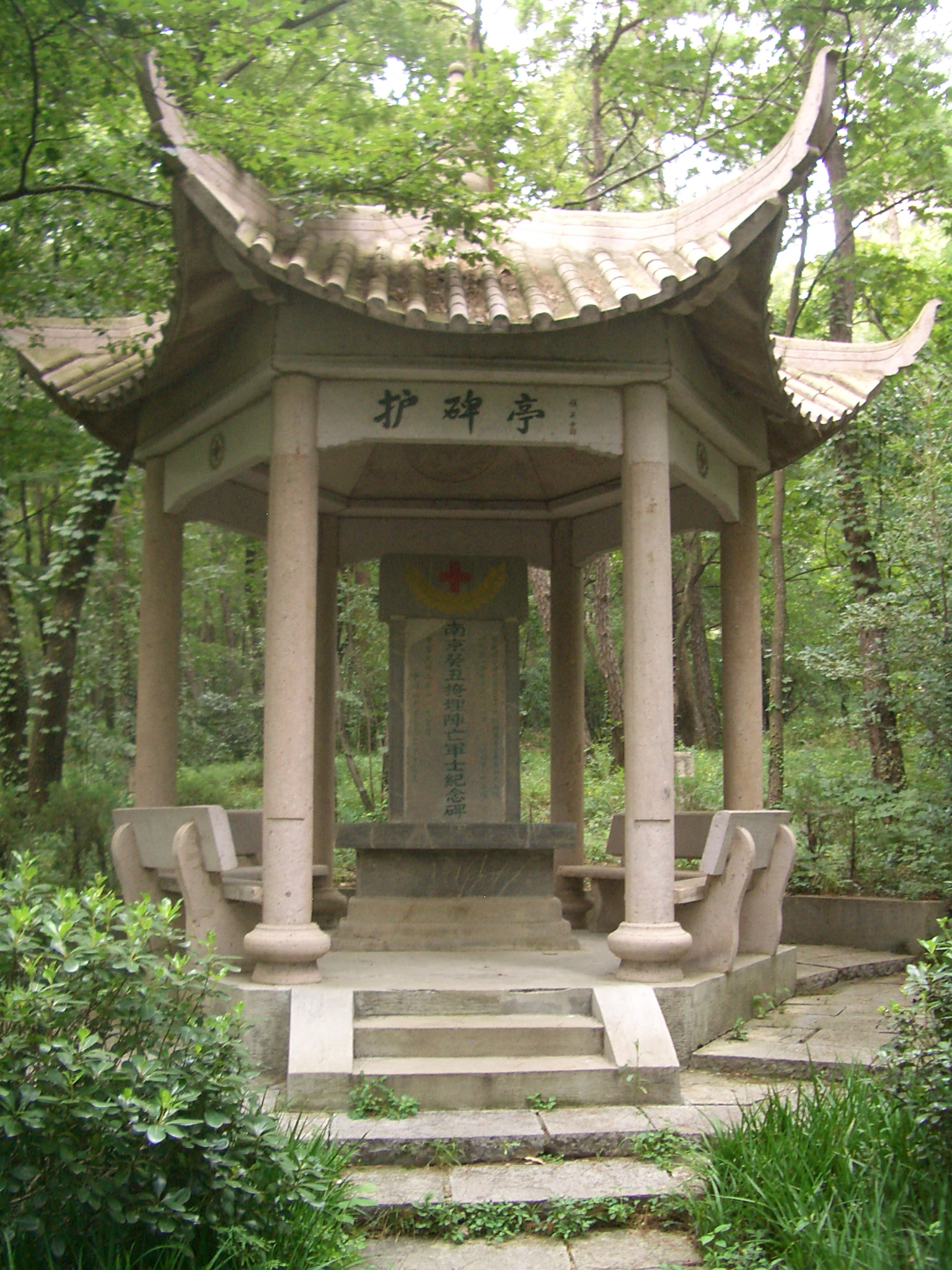
Gazebo near Linggu Pagoda

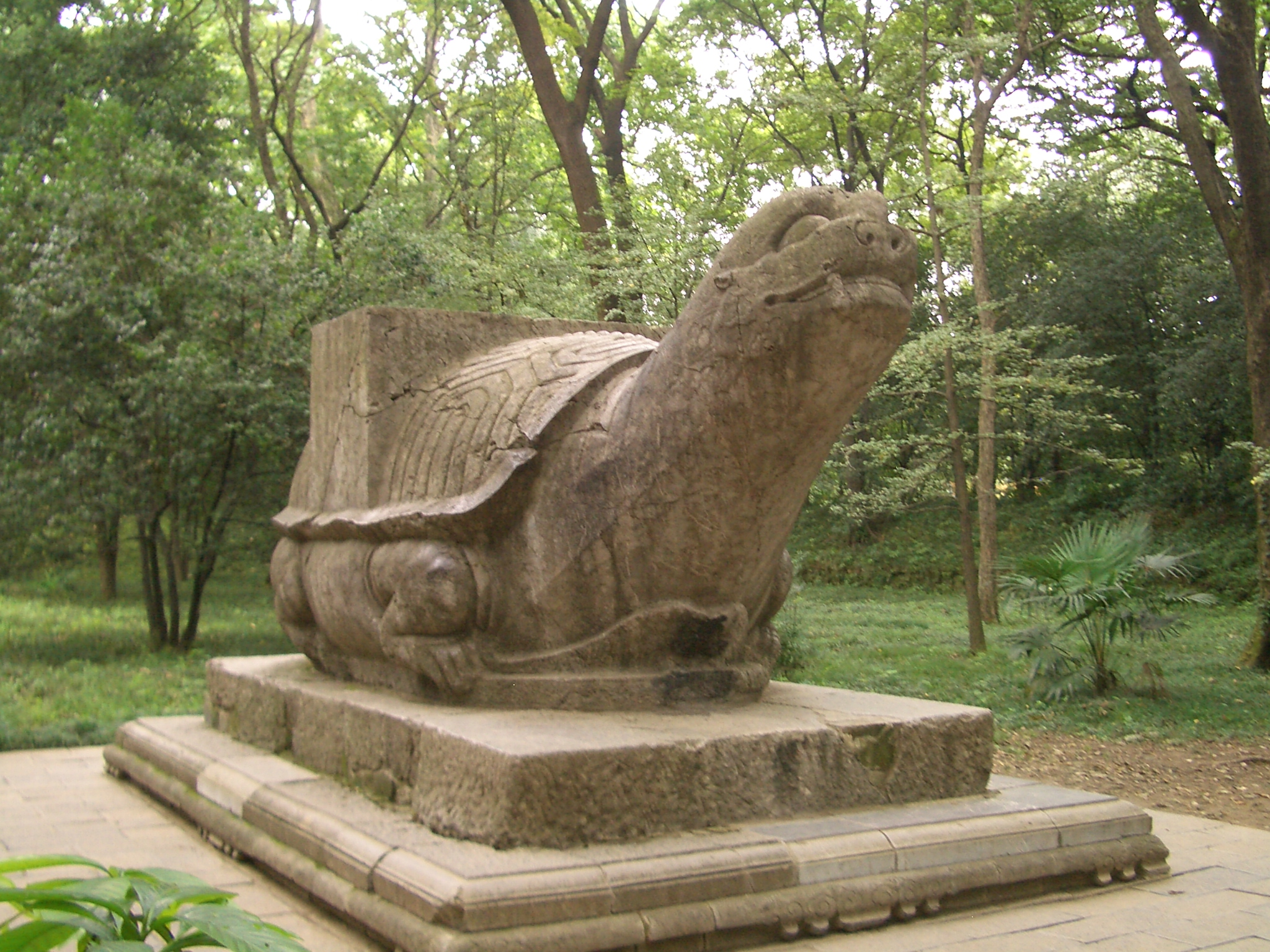
Linggu Stone Tortoise
