= Tan Yankai =

Chinese politician

- 譚延闓
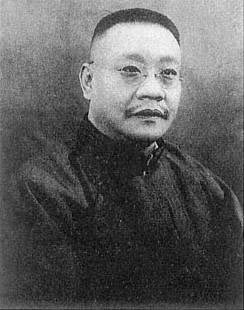

Chairman of the National Government of China
- In office 7 February 1928 – 10 October 1928
- Premier: Pan Fu
- Preceded by: Zhang Zuolin (as Generallissimo of the Beiyang Government)
- Succeeded by: Chiang Kai-shek

Premier of China
- In office 25 October 1928 – 22 September 1930
- President: Chiang Kai-shek
- Preceded by: Pan Fu
- Succeeded by: T. V. Soong

Personal details
- Born: 25 January 1880 Hangzhou, Zhejiang, Qing China
- Died: 22 September 1930 (aged 50) Nanjing, Jiangsu, Republic of China
- Resting place: Linggu Temple
- Party: Kuomintang
- Other political affiliations: Progressive Party
- Parent: Tan Zhonglin (father)
- Education: jinshi degree in Imperial examination (1904)

Tan Yankai
- Traditional Chinese: 譚延闓
- Simplified Chinese: 谭延闿
Transcriptions
Standard Mandarin
- Hanyu Pinyin: Tán Yánkǎi
- Wade–Giles: Tʻan¹ Yen¹-kʻai³
- IPA: [tʰǎn jɛ̌nkʰàɪ]

Tan Yankai ([tʰǎn jɛ̌n kʰàɪ]; Chinese: 譚延闓; pinyin: Tán Yánkǎi; Wade–Giles: T'an Yen-k'ai; 25 January 1880 – 22 September 1930) was a Chinese politician of the Republic of China who briefly served as its head of state and premier.

== Biography ==
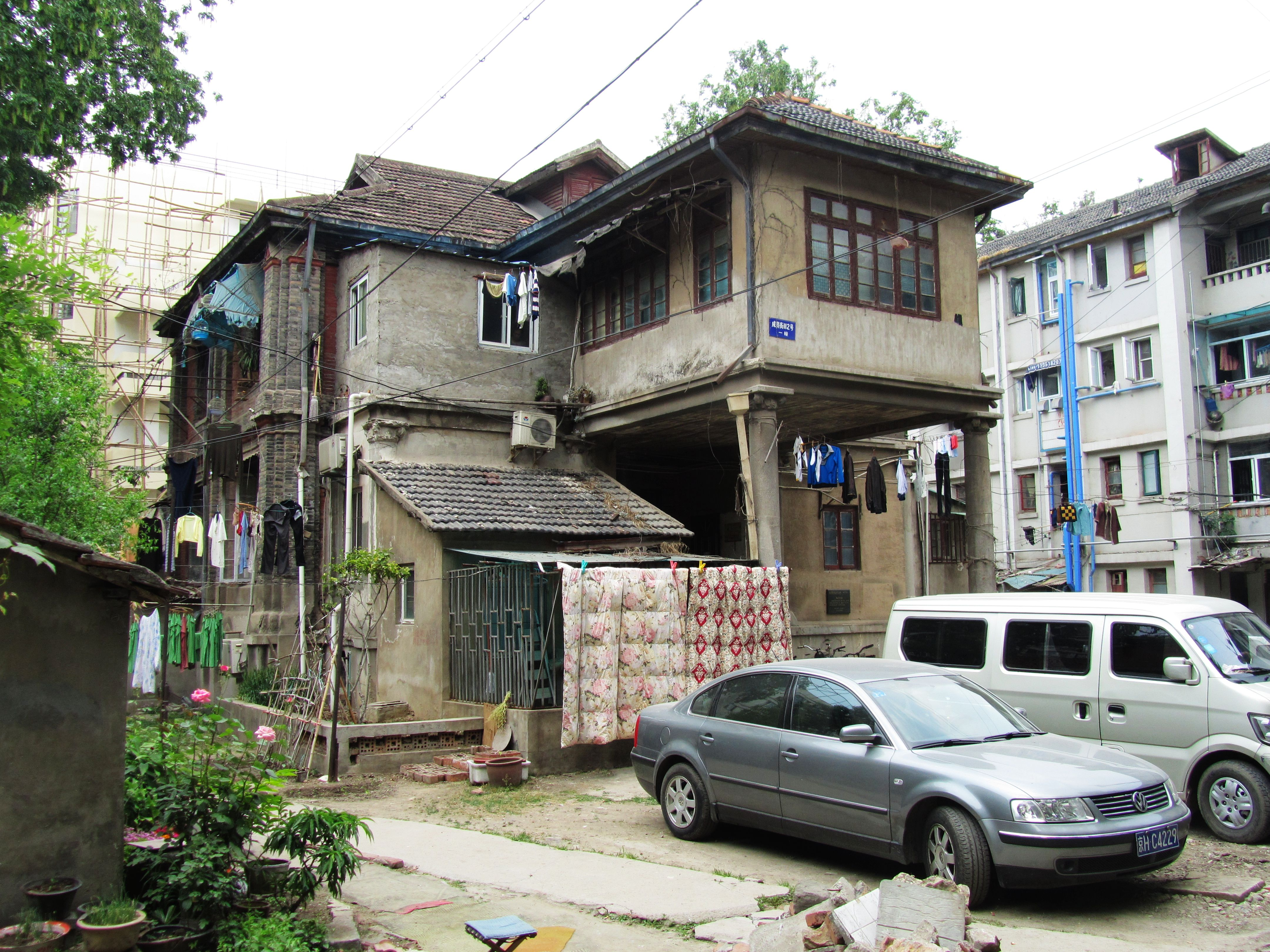
Former residence of Tan Yankai in Nanjing, current address is 112 Chengxian Road（成贤街112号）, near the famous Southeast University.

Tan Yankai was born on 25 January 1880 in Hangzhou, Zhejiang during the waning decades of the Qing dynasty. He was the son of the Qing minister Tan Zhonglin. A member of Liang Qichao's Constitutionalist Party, he campaigned for a parliament and restrained monarchy. As the party renamed itself the Progressive Party after the Xinhai Revolution, he was a major leader.

He left the Progressive Party and joined the Kuomintang and became military governor of Hunan. He remained neutral during Sun Yat-sen's attempt to overthrow President Yuan Shikai in the 1913 Second Revolution, but Yuan removed him anyway. He returned to power after Yuan's death and led his province into resisting the Beiyang Army in the 1917 Constitutional Protection Movement, which effectively saved Sun's Guangdong base. After a brief attempt at spearheading federalism, his subordinates forced him to resign. When Chen Jiongming was driven out of Guangzhou, Tan was made home minister by Sun.

He served as Chairman of the National Government during the first half of the Northern Expedition and again during its conclusion. He was a member of Wang Jingwei's Wuhan Nationalist government and was the first internationally recognized head of state of the Nanjing-based Nationalist government. The United States was the first major power to give recognition on 1 October 1928, though they had already given de facto recognition back in July. After the Organic Law came to effect on the Double Ten Day, he was succeeded by Chiang Kai-shek. Tan then became premier, a post he would hold until he died in office.

Tan died of a cerebral hemorrhage on 22 September 1930 at the age of 50. T. V. Soong assumed his position as acting premier.

== Personal life ==
Tan is entombed in the grounds of the Linggu Temple, near the Sun Yat-sen Mausoleum in Nanjing.

His daughter, Tan Hsiang, married Chen Cheng.

== See also ==
- Nationalist Government (China)
- Preparative Constitutionalism

Political offices
Preceded by Chiang Kai-shek	Chairman of the National Government; 1927–1928	Succeeded by Chiang Kai-shek
Preceded by Zhang Zuolin	Internationally recognized head of state 1928	Succeeded by Chiang Kai-shek
Preceded by Pan Fu	Premier of China; 1928–1930	Succeeded by T. V. Soong
Educational offices
Previous: Chen Shufan (陈树藩)	President of Hunan First Normal University; September 1905-November 1906	Next: Liu Renxi (刘人熙)
