= Tshurpu Scroll =

Chinese handscroll commissioned in 1407

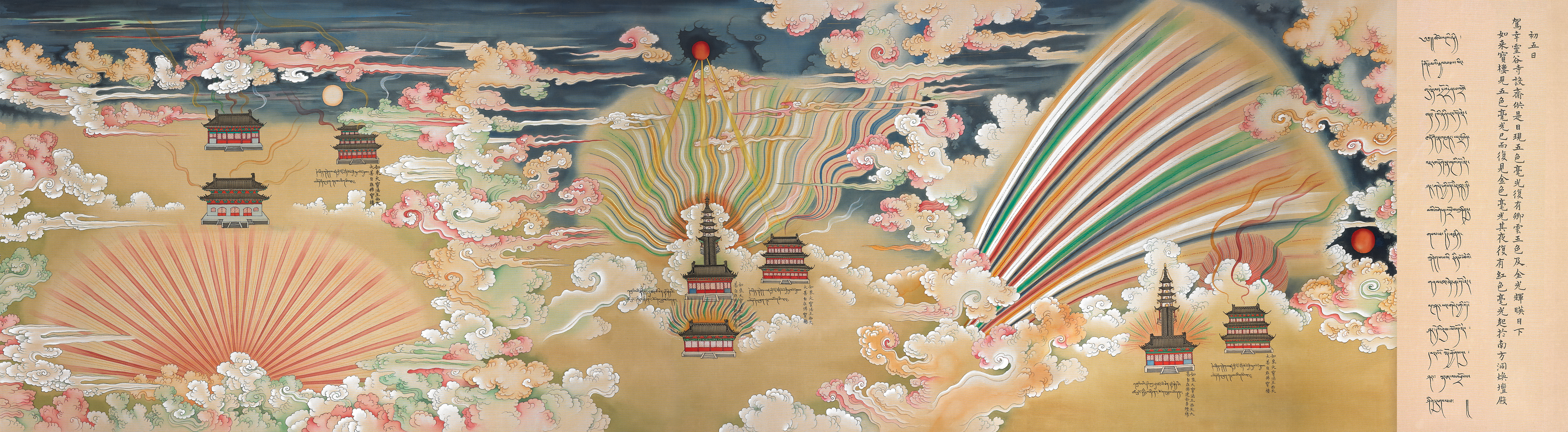
Portion of a reproduced, digital version of the Tshurpu scroll

The Tsurphu Scroll depicts the miracles that the fifth Karmapa, (Deshin Shepka) performed during his visit to Nanjing, China in 1407. The handscroll was constructed with oil paint on silk. It is nearly 50 meters long and contains forty-nine illustrated scenes with multilingual inscriptions. It is currently preserved at the Tibet Museum in Lhasa, Tibet.

== Names and translations ==
The Tshurpu Scroll is also known as the Miracles of the Mass of Universal Salvation handscroll.

In Chinese, the name for this scroll is "Gamaba wei Ming Taizu jianfu tu," a phrase that Author Graeme Ford translates as "Pictures of the Karmapa Performing a Ceremony for Ming Emperor Taizu."

== Dimensions, medium and inscriptions ==
The Tshurpu Scroll is approximately 50 meters in length. The scroll is made from silk, and is decorated by oil paint. The multilingual inscriptions that coincide with each of the forty-nine scenes were written in black ink with an ink brush. The languages of the inscriptions that coincide with each illustration are written in Chinese, Persian, Uyghur, Tibetan and Mongolian.

== Artistic attribution ==
The Yongle Emperor commissioned this scroll to document the Mass of Universal Salvation Ceremony that the Fifth Karmapa conducted during his visit to Nanjing in 1407. Ming Dynasty Court painters recorded forty-nine separate scenes from the ceremony in the scroll. These unnamed court painters also wrote each of illustrations' multilingual inscriptions. The Yongle Emperor oversaw the court painters that created the scroll. Yongle drafted the architectural and religious imagery as well as the multilingual inscriptions prior to the court painter's finalized version on the scroll we see today.

== Imagery and symbolism ==
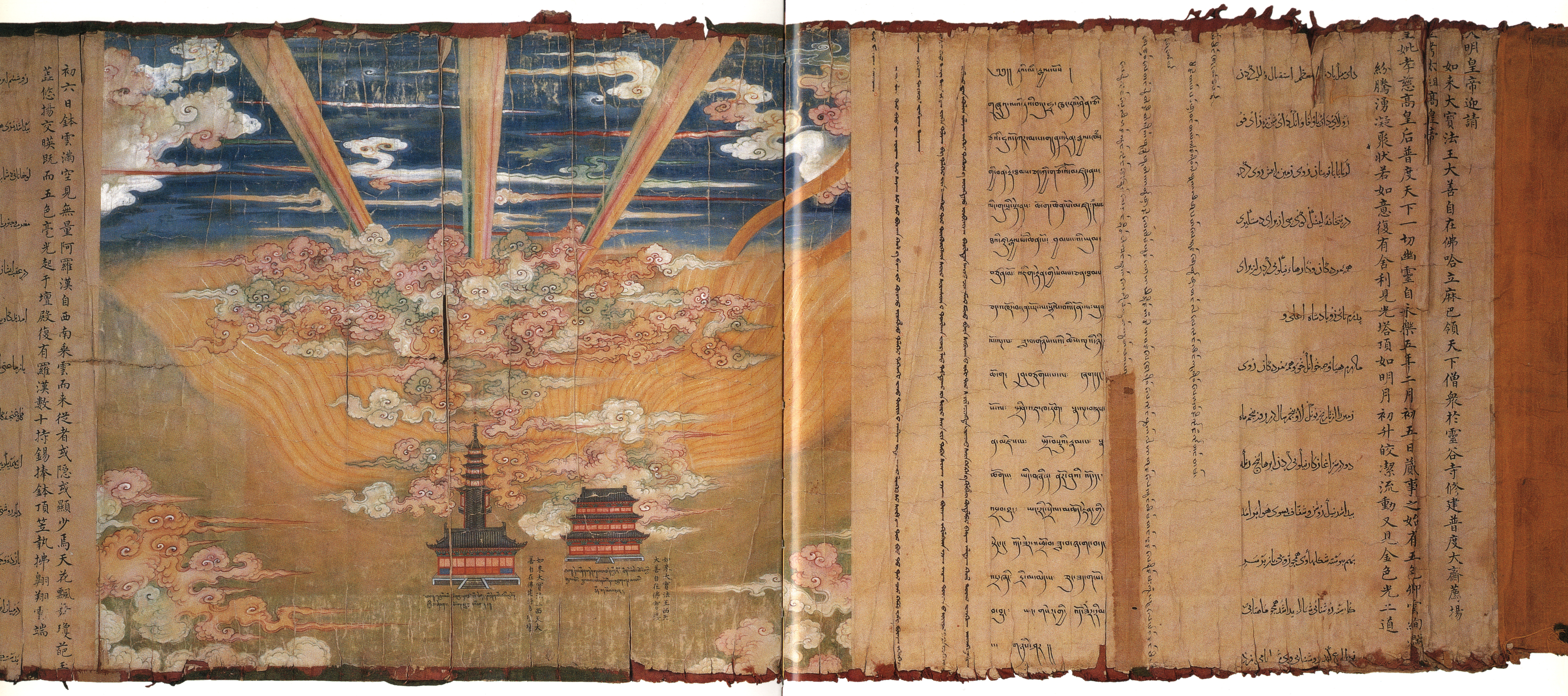
Illustration of the first day of the Mass of Universal Salvation Ceremony which the Fifth Karmapa conducted for the Yongle Emperor's deceased parents, as represented on the Tshurpu Scroll.

=== Symbols Present within the Tshurpu Scroll ===
Humans are largely excluded from the illustrations. Instead, the scenes focus on rays of rainbow light, swirling clouds, flowers, cranes, and the imperial architecture present at the site of the ceremony. The structures depicted include the Karmapa's temporary residence, the temple where the mass was conducted, and the tomb of Yongle's parents.

=== Possible interpretations of the scroll's symbols ===
One interpretation of the scroll's architecture, by Art Historian Patricia Berger, states Yongle and his artists "eliminated all distractions" from the scenes, and even excluded the protagonists of the event, in order to "focus on the miraculous events at hand." Berger notes how the particular buildings correspond to each of the prominent participants, and how the symbolically architecture stands in for these people in their absence.

The multicolored light which radiates throughout the sky may have an important symbolic significance, according to scholars. Chinese historian Tseten Namgyal presumes that the five colors of the rainbow's light throughout the illustrations–white, yellow, red, green and blue–correspond to the five elements and the Five Buddhas of Tibetan Buddhism. Art Historian Patricia Berger similarly explains how these rainbows, referred to as "wuse haoguang" or "multicolored rays of light" in Chinese tradition, are often an artistic manifestation of any Karmapa's religious power.

== The location for the mass of universal salvation ==
=== Defining a universal salvation mass ===
As explained by historian Jingyu Liu, the universal salvation mass as ceremony in which the souls of the dead grant blessings onto the living. These "universal salvation rites" became increasingly prominent in twelfth century China and are still practiced in contemporary China today.

Scholar Jin Yuzhong similarly defines the purpose of salvation rituals as serving "to equalize good fortune between humans and deities." Yuzhong notes that all people can practice these rituals, whether they are emperors or common people.

=== Perspectives on Yongle's motivation for the ceremony ===
Art historian Suoland Quije suggests that the ceremony Yongle initiated with the Fifth Karmpa for his deceased parents was not unusual, as these rituals were "well-established" Chinese traditions. The ceremony took place a decade after Yongle's parent's, Emperor Hongwu and Empress Ma, had passed. Quije suggests that Yongle also aimed to honor his parents and to dispel the controversy of his lineage and claim to throne. She asserts that Yongle believed this would establish his own legitimacy as the emperor. Art Historian Patricia Berger articulates part of the controversy that Quije outlines in her argument. She states that Yongle may have been the son of a consort to Hongwu, rather than of his mother, Empress Ma, who had raised him. Quije goes onto reference how Yongle usurped the throne from his nephew, who was the designated successor to the Hongwu Emperor. As a result, Quije makes the assertion that by performing a "filial duty" to his parents, Quije believes that Yongle aimed to "refresh" the memory of his subjects to recall his lineage from his parents in this Mass of Universal Salvation. These scholars provide two perspectives on the Yongle's motivation to conduct a Mass of Universal Salvation for his deceased parents.

=== Interpretations of the setting for the ceremony ===
The imagery on the scroll is set in Nanjing, where the Fifth Karmapa conducted the Mass of Universal Salvation for the Yongle Emperor's deceased parents in 1407. Nanjing served as the primary administrative center for the Ming Dynasty before the capital was relocated to Beijing.

The Ming Dynasty was founded by the Yongle Emperor's father: the Hongwu Emperor. When Hongwu ascended the throne in 1368, he initially inherited the former Yuan Dynasty Capital of Dadu from the preceding Mongolian rulers. However, Hongwu did not rule from this metropolis. Instead, he chose to base his center of administration was based in southern China, in the city of Nanjing. Hongwu renamed Dadu as Bieping, and subsequently redrew the city's limits to exclude the portions of the former capital's northern and southern borders. Nanjing served as the first capital of the Ming from 1368-1421.

When Hongwu's son, the Yongle Emperor, assumed the throne 1402, he initiated the transition of the Ming Dynasty capital to Beiping, the former Yuan Dynasty Capital. As Historian Jonathan Hay notes, Beiping has remained the capital of China since, though now it is known as Beijing. Hay additionally explains how the Hongwu Emperor restored and refurbished the Yuan Dyansty's former imperial palace in Beiping for the use of his son, the Yongle Emperor. At this time, the Yongle Emperor was known merely by his birth name, Zhu Di, and his official title as the Prince of Yan. When he reached the age of twenty, the future Yongle Emperor Zhu Di assumed this space that his father had prepared for him. He lived there for twenty years, until 1399. Upon becoming the Yongle Emperor in 1402, Yongle initiated another transition of the Ming capital city to Beiping. As noted by Hay, Beiping has remained the capital of China since, though today it is known as Beijing.

The Mass of Universal Salvation that is depicted in the Tshurpu Scroll took placed in Nanjing during the reign of the Yongle Emperor in the original Ming Dynasty capital, Nanjing. Art Historian Patricia Berger suggests that Yongle likely chose this setting to connect the ceremony to both his upbringing and the city from which his parents ruled. Berger further posits that the selection of Nanjing for the ceremony specifically aimed to honor Yongle's deceased parents in the place where they are presumed to have died.

== Yongle's relationship to the Fifth Karmapa ==
=== Priest-patron relationships ===
Art Historian Craig Clunas notes how the Yongle Emperor explicitly aimed to engage with the Fifth Karmapa in order to recreate the priest-patron relationship that he observed between former Mongol Emperor Quibilai and Phakpa, another significant Buddhist teacher. Yongle invited multiple Karmapa's to his palace throughout his reign, but his relationship with the Fifth Karmapa was the strongest.

According to art historian Aurelia Campbell, the relationship between the Fifth Karmapa and the Yongle Emperor aimed to mutually uplift both party's authority. Yongle hoped to gain religious confirmation from the Karmapa, while the Karmapa would be granted a platform to acquire followers and promote his own Buddhist practices.

=== The Fifth Karmapa's invitation to Nanjing ===
The Fifth Karmapa, Deshin Shepka, was called upon in 1407 by Emperor Yongle to visit Nanjing. Yongle requested for the Karmapa to provide religious instruction to his servants and family. In his invitation letter, Yongle specifically requested that the Fifth Karmapa would perform a salvation ritual for his deceased parents. Patricia Berger notes how Deshin Shepka performed countless miracles in the year he visited Nanjing.

== Possible motivations for the Tshurpu scroll ==
The Yongle Emperor's usurped the throne from his nephew, who was the designated successor. Art historian Dora Ching argues that as a result of his violent acquisition of power, the Yongle Emperor desired to justify his claim to the throne. Ching goes on to express her belief that Yongle's "ties to Tibetan clerics were advantageous not only because they affirmed his sincere religious beliefs but also because they could be used to buttress his legitimacy". Ching notes that Yongle's political motivations are not explicitly stated in Chinese sources, and that she has merely derived this conclusion from her own Tibetan translations of texts.

Additionally, art historian Aurelia Campbell believes that by holding a Mass of Universal Salvation and documenting it in the Tshurpu Scroll, Yongle strove to politically and religiously justified his claim to the throne. She notes that "the emperor constantly looked for signs that Heaven approved of his reign. If a sign appeared, he would immediately order that it be documented in visual form." These interpretation of the scroll suggests that the Yongle Emperor strategically cultivated relationships with Tibetan clerics, and commissioned religious art to bolster both his religious and political legitimacy.
