= Harvard Bixi =

Harvard's Chinese Stele
- Harvard Bixi
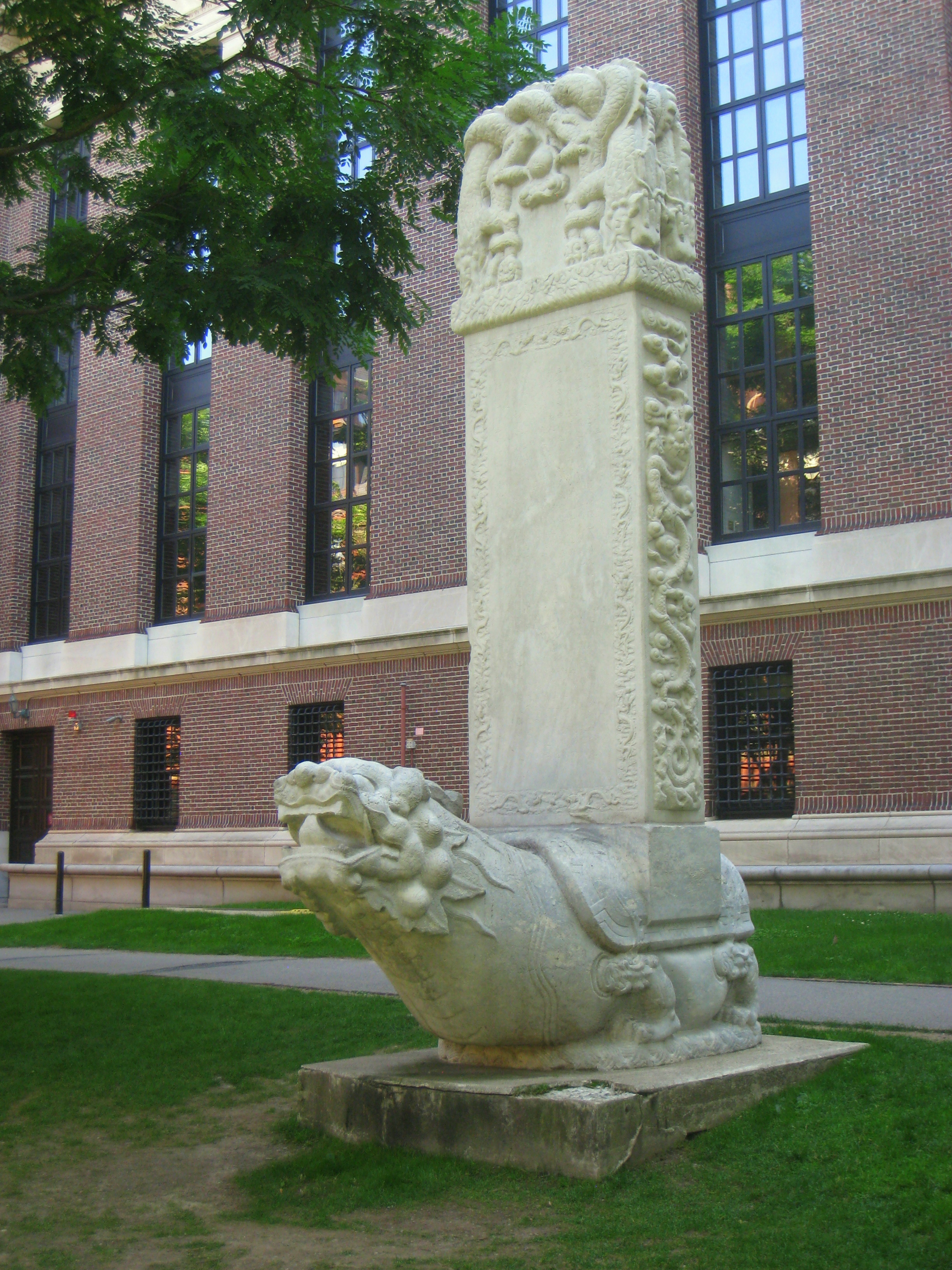
- Harvard Bixi before the north facade of Widener Library
- Interactive map of Harvard's Chinese Stele
- Location: Cambridge, Massachusetts
- Coordinates: 42°22′25″N 71°7′1″W
- Type: Chinese tortoise-borne stele
- Material: Marble
- Height: 17 ft (5.2 m)
- Opening date: 1796-1820 (construction date); September 17, 1936 (presented to Harvard)
- Dedicated to: Harvard University

The Harvard Bixi is a 17-foot high, 27 ton Chinese marble stele with a turtle pedestal located at Harvard University, north of Boylston Hall and west of Widener Library in Harvard Yard, in Cambridge, Massachusetts. The stele was presented to the university by the Chinese Harvard Alumni for its Tercentenary in September 1936.

== History ==
The Bixi was created ca. 1820 in Beijing, and the stele was originally a gift from the Jiaqing Emperor to Songyun (松筠), the governor-general of Jiangsu and Jiangxi. Although the original inscription was unknown, the stele was kept in the Old Summer Palace in Beijing until the complex was destroyed in 1860, during the Second Opium War. The meticulous carvings of dragons chasing pearls on the sides and top of the marble tablet are the only traces that indicate the stele's imperial past.

=== Harvard's Tercentennial celebrations ===
In the 1930s there were five Harvard Clubs in China. More than 35 members of the clubs were known to be involved in donating the stele, and at least two of them attended the Tercentennial Ceremony in September 1936. They were Dr. J. Heng Liu, president of Harvard Club of Nanking, and Fred Sze, a banker and the president of Harvard Club of Shanghai. New inscriptions were carved on the front of the marble tablet. Shih Hu, who was invited to take part in the Tercentenary Celebration to receive an honorary doctoral degree from Harvard, was believed to be the calligrapher of the inscription.

== Inscription ==
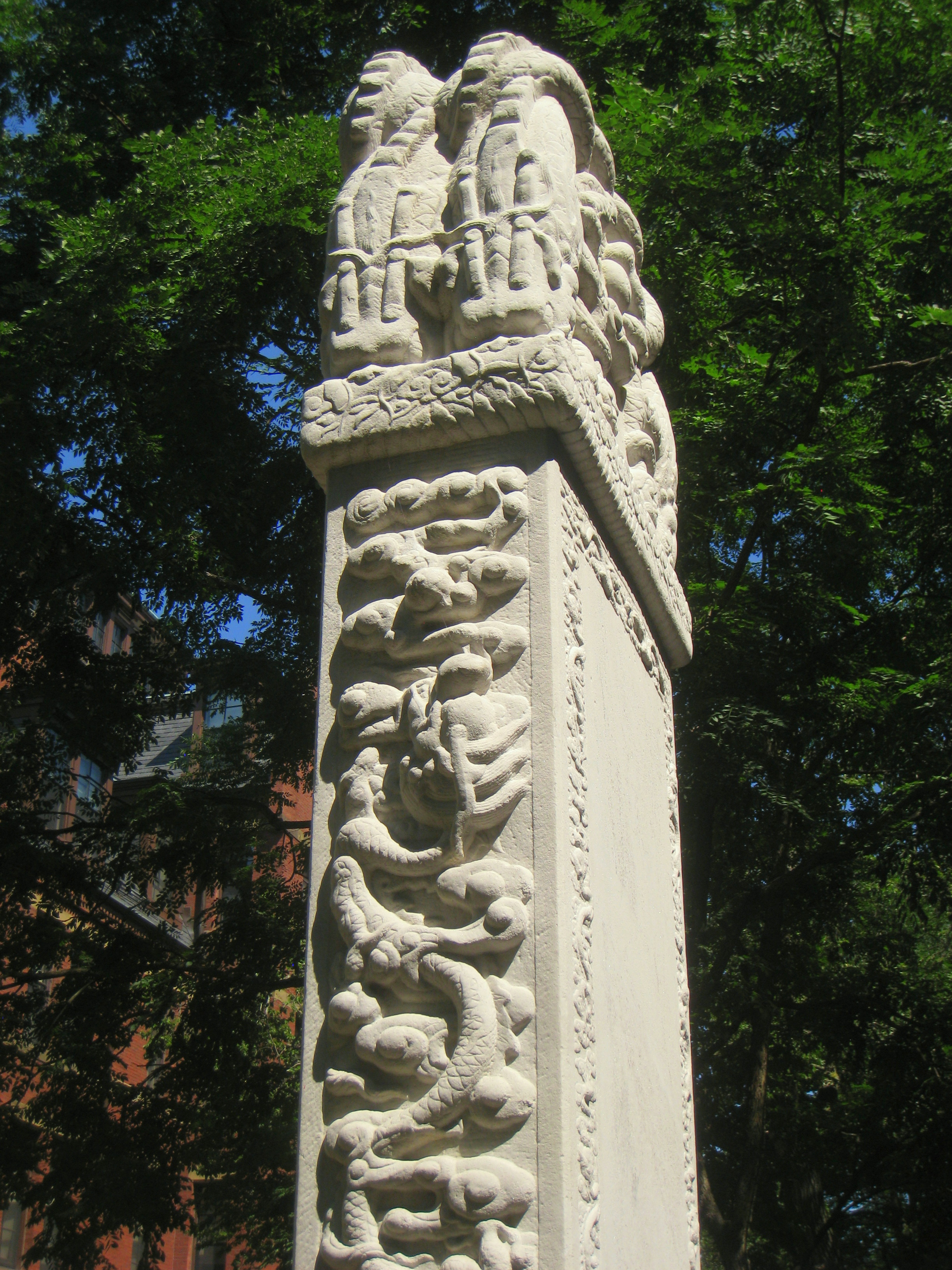

The Bixi's stele is inscribed with Chinese text in which the content commemorates the tercentennial of Harvard University on behalf of Chinese Harvard Alumni. In September 1936 Dr. J. Heng Liu provided an English translation of the inscription which has been the official translation recorded in the Harvard Archives. However, it was unclear why the English translation provided by Dr. Liu did not contain a part in the inscription in which the Harvard Chinese alumni expressed hope for a brighter and more prosperous China.

Following is part of the English translation provided by Dr. J. Heng Liu in 1936:

The strength of a nation necessarily depends upon the progress of civilization, which in turn is contingent upon the growth of intellectual knowledge of its people. With this belief, many pioneers have devoted their lives to the promotion of education in all countries. Far-reaching effects in the enhancement of civilization are attained invariably although the results may not be apparent until hundreds of years have elapsed.

The truth of this statement is established by the celebration of this tercentennial of Harvard University. Imbued with the spirit of education, John Harvard left England over 300 years ago for the new colony in North America to become a teacher in Boston. Subsequently, he was instrumental in founding a college in Cambridge.

Today, as we celebrate the tercentennial of our alma mater, we look back with pride to the achievements of the founder and of other leaders who have followed in his steps. Their noble accomplishments are reflected in the world wide reputation of our alma mater as a seat of learning of the highest standards, in the wealth of valuable contribution, in the wide influence its children have exerted in many lands, and in the exalted position occupied by the nation in which it is situated.

== Present ==
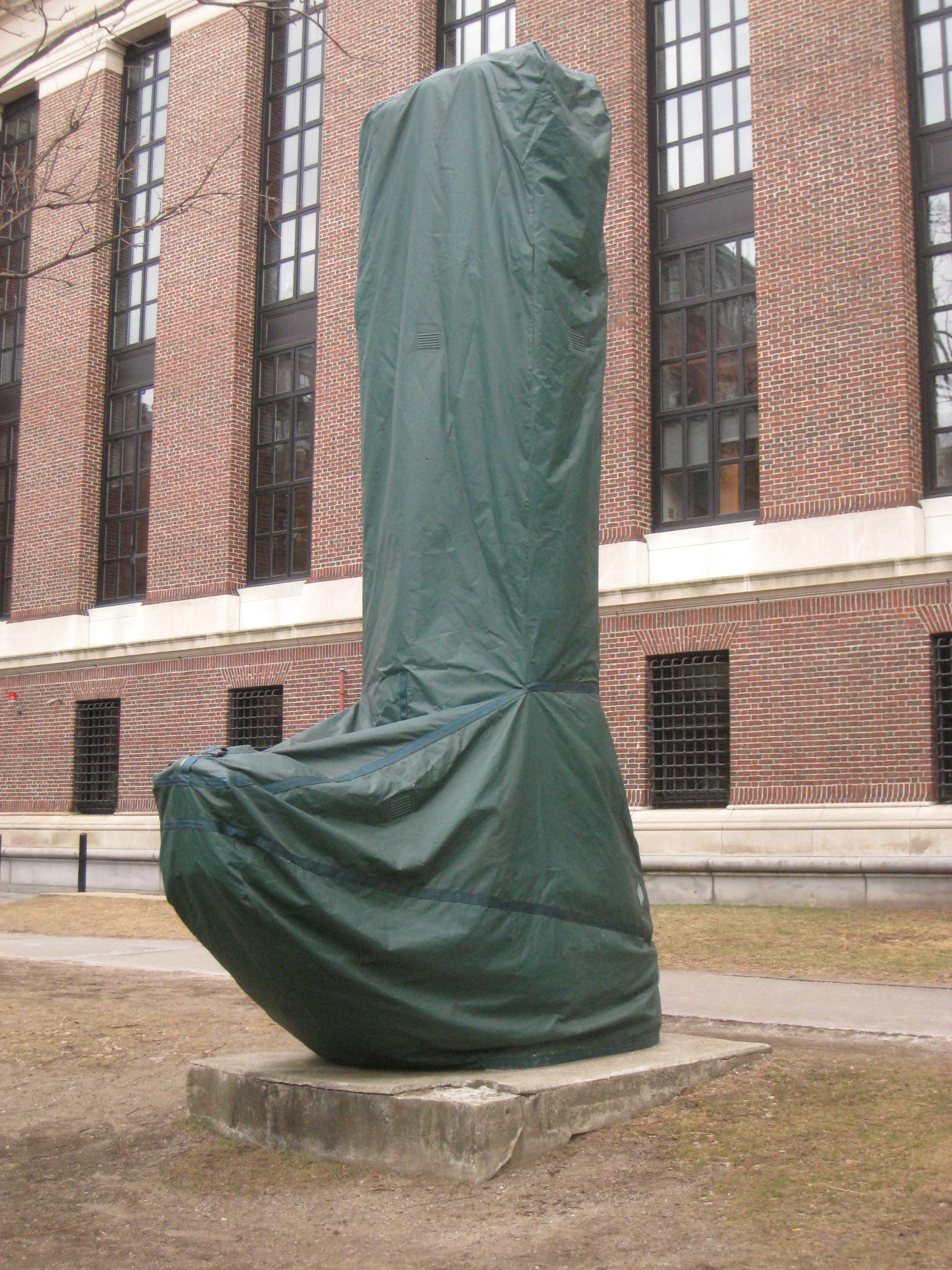
Harvard wraps the Bixi statue and other outdoor arts during the winters to protect them from harmful acid rain and snow.

Due to acid rain and severe weathering, many of the inscriptions on the stele have become illegible. In the early 1980s the Fogg Museum Conservation Department examined the condition of the stele and proposed moving it to an indoor location. The site chosen was the Holyoke Center Arcade. Due to financial cost the plan was abandoned. In 1998 an informational notice appeared in front of the stele which stated the origin of the stele and that the university was working on a suitable indoor location for the statue. The notice did not offer a translation of the inscription. Plans were also underway to relocate the stele to the Center for Government and International Studies (CGIS) buildings on Cambridge Street and Sumner Road. The CGIS was completed in 2005 but the stele remained in the Harvard Yard.

Various groups such as the Harvard Club of Beijing, Harvard Club of Taipei and Harvard-Yenching Institute have expressed interests in preserving or restoring the stele since 2004. In 2009 the University Planning Office began to work on adding interpretive information to the base of the stele. A signage designer has been commissioned to study options for creating a sign at the base.

In 2012, a project was started to create a 3-D scan of the monument, using the same digitizing technique (structured light scanner) that had been used in the Corpus of Maya Hieroglyphic Inscriptions program at Harvard's Peabody Museum of Archaeology and Ethnology.
