= Henry Murphy (architect) =

American architect

Henry Killam Murphy
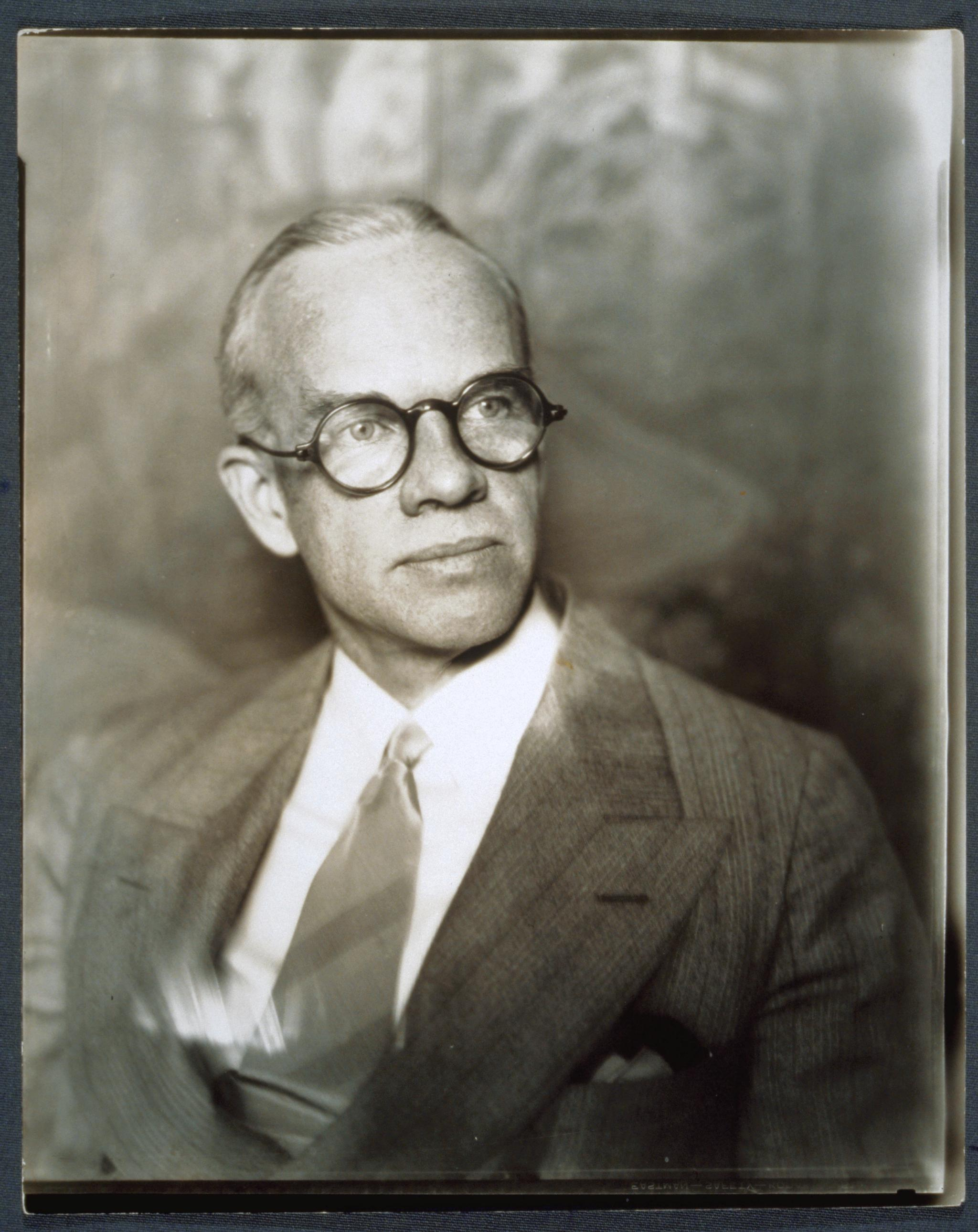
- Murphy in 1928-9
- Born: 19 August 1877; New Haven, Connecticut
- Died: 12 October 1954 (aged 77); Branford, Connecticut
- Education: Yale University
- Occupation: Architect
- Projects: University of Shanghai; Tsinghua University, Beijing; Ginling College, Nanking; Yenching University, presently Peking University; Yale-in-China, Changsha; Rikkyo University, Tokyo; Yonsei University, Seoul

Henry Killam Murphy (August 19, 1877 – October 12, 1954) was an American architect noted for his design of educational establishments in the North-East of the United States, China and Japan.

== Early life and education ==
Henry Killam Murphy was born in 1877 in New Haven, Connecticut, to parents Alice Button Killam and John Murphy.

Murphy attended the Hopkins School, graduating in 1895. He then went on to study at Yale University graduating in 1899 with a Bachelor of Fine Arts degree. After a year spent at the Yale Graduate School preparing for a career as an architect, Murphy was first employed in this capacity in the New York City offices of Tracey and Startwout in 1900.

== Murphy & Dana Architects ==
In 1906 Murphy opened his own firm with Yale University instructor, Richard Henry Dana Jr., a business partnership that lasted until 1921. Together they took on work such as designing the early Loomis Chaffee campus in 1912, and successfully earned commissions to design numerous private residential and college academic buildings in the North East of the United States, in China and in Japan. Examples of their architectural work still extant include the historic administration buildings, old library and college chapel of Rikkyo University in Tokyo. The firm designed the Punch & Judy Theatre, a Broadway theatre that opened in 1914.

After Dana left in 1921, the firm continued as Murphy, McGill & Hamlin until 1924 when Murphy established his own independent practice.

== Noted architectural works ==
A plan from 1922 by Murphy's firm for the Hopkins School campus

Murphy, both in partnership and independently, designed a wide range of buildings throughout his career, including several buildings in his home state of Connecticut. Murphy worked for his alma mater Hopkins School, designing the early campus in 1922 and center building Baldwin Hall in 1925.

During his career Murphy made eight trips to China, the first for a few weeks in 1914, the last and longest from 1931 to 1935. In 1919, he was in charge of designing the campus of University of Shanghai (now University of Shanghai for Science and Technology). In the early 1920s, Murphy designed several landmark buildings for Tsinghua University, Beijing, including The Grand Auditorium and the Main Library. He was an advocate of traditional Chinese architectural styles, adapted to modern uses.

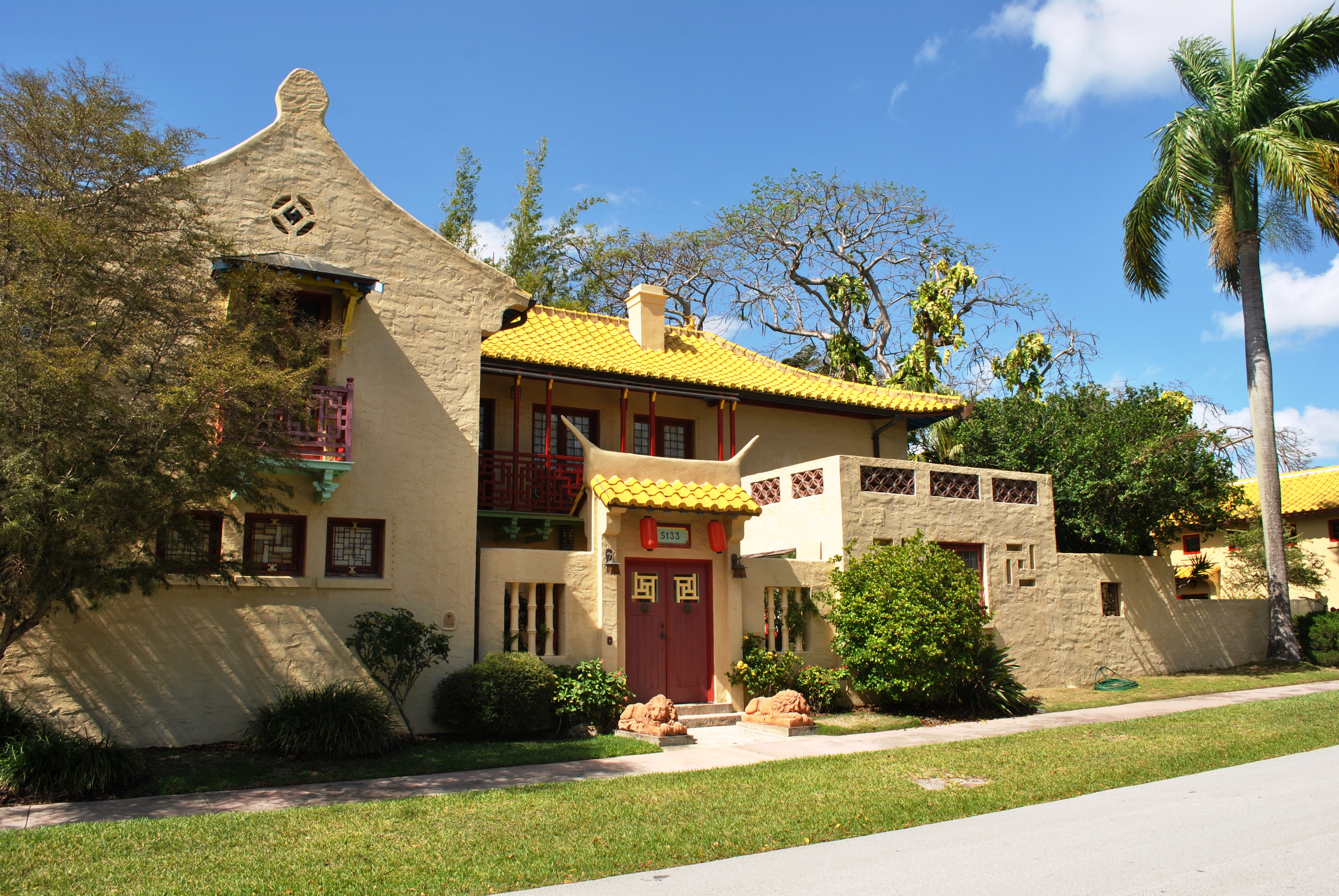
Chinese Village (Henry Killian Murphy, 1926-1927)

Murphy attracted the attention of Chinese leader Chiang Kai-shek and was hired in 1928 to design a modern capital for China in the ancient city of Nanjing. One of his more notable proposals was to save the wall around the city as a concourse. Murphy designed other Chinese buildings such as the National Revolutionary Army Memorial Cemetery on Purple Mountain over Nanjing. Chiang Kai-shek was not Murphy's only connection to China. Murphy also designed a small Chinese village of eight homes in Coral Gables, Florida, as well as the Chinese Nationality Room in the Cathedral of Learning.

Murphy returned to the United States in 1935 and retired to a house he designed in Branford, Connecticut. He died at his home in 1954.

== Family ==
Murphy was married four times, and had no children. His first marriage was in 1905 to Edna Mitchell Cook, who died in 1918. His second marriage in 1920 was to Ethel Andrews, from whom he was divorced in 1926. (She would remarry John Marshall Harlan II in 1928.) In 1930 Murphy married the art historian and collector of Eurasian bronzes Dagny Carter, author of China Magnificent, Five Thousand Years of Chinese Art (first published 1936). In 1949 he married his fourth wife, Rosalie Smith Exum, in North Carolina.
