= Henry Murphy =

Henry Murphy may refer to:

- Henry A. Murphy (1867–1936), English-American businessman and politician
- Henry C. Murphy (1810–1882), American politician
- Henry Murphy (architect) (1857–1954), American architect who was hired by Chiang Kai-shek for a variety of projects
- Henry Murphy (field hockey) (1882–1942), Irish field hockey player
- Henry Murphy (politician) (1921–2006), Canadian politician and judge
- Henry George Murphy (1884–1939), English art deco silversmith
- Henry V. Murphy (1890–1960), American architect who specialized in churches and schools for Roman Catholic clients
- Henry Murphy (bishop) (1912-1973), Catholic bishop of Limerick.

== See also ==
- Hank Murphy (disambiguation)
- Harry Murphy (disambiguation)
