= Aviation Martyrs' Cemetery =

Cemetery for aviators in Jiangsu Province, China

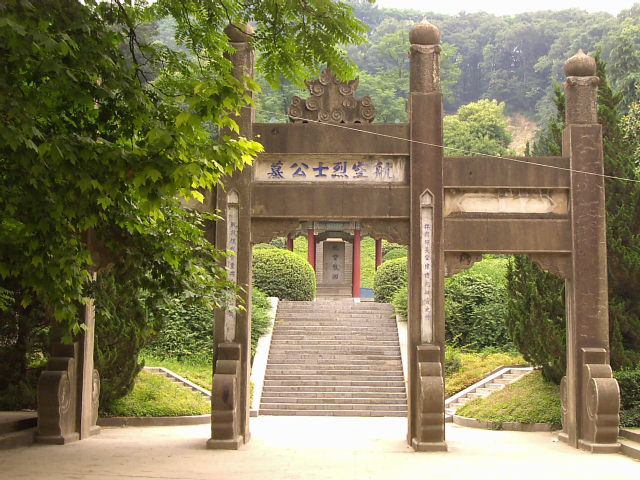
- Cemetery of Aviation Martyrs Cultural Relics Protection Unit of Jiangsu Province
- Interactive map of Aviation Martyrs' Cemetery

Details
- Established: 1932
- Location: Nanjing
- Country: China
- Type: Important historical sites and representative buildings in modern times

The Aviation Martyrs' Cemetery is one of the most important historical sites and representative buildings of modern times in Jiangsu Province. It is located in the northern part of Zhong Shan (also known as Zi Jin Shan) in Nanjing, Jiangsu Province, and was built in 1932, with pagodas, a pavilion, an altar, and a cemetery. There are 4,296 martyrs in the cemetery, including R.O.C. Airmen who died in the Northern Expedition and the Shanghai War of the National Revolutionary Army, Chinese and foreign airmen who died in the Second Sino-Japanese War, and R.O.C. Airmen who died in the civil war between China and the Communist Party. Some of the martyrs have a tomb with their clothes, while the rest have their names, origins, and dates of birth and death inscribed on the memorial. The Aviation Martyrs' Cemetery was burned down by the invading Japanese army during the war and was rebuilt to its pre-war condition after the war. Later, the cemetery was completely destroyed by the Red Guards during the Cultural Revolution, all the skeletons were lost and reconstructed in 1987.

== History ==
=== Before the Second Sino-Japanese War ===
In 1931, Huang Bingheng, director of the Aviation Administration of the Ministry of Military Affairs (now the Ministry of National Defense of the Republic of China), proposed to build a cemetery for aviation martyrs near the cemetery of fallen soldiers of the National Revolutionary Army. The Management Committee of the Prime Minister's Mausoleum considers it difficult to create open space at the southern area of the nearby Purple Mountain (now called Chung Mountain), and changed the location to a 50-acre plot of land near Wangjiawan at the northern end of the Zijinshan Mountain (approximately 33,350 square meters). To build the cemetery, which cost $26,000, the Aviation Committee (reorganized as the Aviation Department) solicited donations from senior generals, raising a total of $13,290 (of which C.C. Chiang donated $3,000, the largest amount of all donations), with the balance paid by the Aviation Committee.

Construction of the Aviation Martyrs' Cemetery began in 1932, designed by Qiu Dexiao, a professor at Jinling University, and was completed in August of the same year. Shortly after the completion of the cemetery, a public ceremony was held to bury more than 30 Air Force soldiers who died in service, including martyrs of the National Revolutionary Army's Northern Expedition and the Shanghai War, as well as some Air Force personnel who died in flight accidents. A public memorial service is held every year on 29 March.

=== During and after the Second Sino-Japanese War ===
After the 7 July Incident, the Second Sino-Japanese War broke out and the Republic of China Air Force was engaged in the war, but the main force was wiped out by the invading Japanese army and several pilots died on the battlefield; as a result, 24 more people were buried in the Aviation Martyrs' Cemetery, such as Liu Zigang and other Air Force soldiers. Due to the chaos of the war and the tense situation, many martyrs were combined into one grave and hastily buried. In 1937, Nanjing fell to the Japanese after the Battle of Nanking, and the Japanese destroyed the Aviation Martyrs' Cemetery. All the buildings on the ground were burned, as well as all the graves and remains in retaliation for the resistance of the Chinese air force against the Japanese.

After the victory of the war against Japan, the government of the Republic of China re-designated the capital Nanjing and carried out large-scale repairs to the cemetery, basically rebuilding it in the same condition as before the war, and over 2,000 Japanese prisoners of war were ordered to participate in its construction; The authorities collected the remains of the air force martyrs and buried them in this cemetery one after another, and built clothespins for the air force martyrs whose remains could not be found at the request of their families. The government buried three batches of martyrs (more than 77 in total) from 1946 to 1948 on 29 March (i.e. Memorial Day for Revolutionary Martyrs), and public ceremonies were held. Some of the martyrs were killed in the Communist civil war rather than the war of resistance, such as the pilot who died accidentally while flying an airplane for Chiang Kai-shek's confidant Dai Kasa. In addition to Chinese soldiers, the government also buried in this cemetery some foreign airmen who assisted China during the war of resistance.

=== After the establishment of the People's Republic of China ===
Since there is no one to manage the Aviation Martyrs' Cemetery, by 1956 the cemetery was overgrown and barren, but still in good condition.

In 1964, on the eve of the Cultural Revolution, Mao Zedong implied in his literary works that the tombs of ancient figures should be demolished, kicking off the "Tomb Demolition Movement". By 1966, when the Cultural Revolution broke out, political correctness was in full swing, and martyrs loyal to the Chinese Kuomintang were considered enemies. Therefore, the Red Guards, completely destroyed the Aviation Martyrs' Cemetery following the instruction that "we must oppose whatever the enemy embraces." The damage was deeper than the damage done by the Japanese invasion forces in those years. All the skeletons were lost and the cemetery was eventually left empty, with only the old pagoda remaining.

After the end of the Cultural Revolution, in 1985, on the 40th anniversary of the victory in the war, some members of the Beijing Municipal Committee of the Chinese People's Political Consultative Conference proposed to rebuild the Aviation Martyrs' Cemetery, and the government allocated 450,000 RMB for the purpose. However, no old photos of the cemetery were found at that time, so the reconstruction project could only be carried out according to the Nanjing Archives' drawings. Most of the buildings in the Republic of China were not in their original state. Moreover, all the skeletons of the martyrs were lost during the Cultural Revolution, and even if they were rebuilt, they could only be built as the Tomb of the Clothes. The reconstruction work was completed in 1987. In 1995 (the 50th anniversary of the victory in the war), the monument added to the Aviation Martyrs' Cemetery was inaugurated.

In September 2015, the memorial was inscribed with 990 war martyrs from China and the United States. Luo Chaojun, deputy director of the Nanjing Anti-Japanese Aviation Martyrs Memorial Museum, explained that the first Chinese martyrs engraved on the monument were only pilots and officers, but not soldiers, air service, and ground support personnel and that this time the additional engraving was able to fully reflect the aviation personnel who died in the war against Japan. Since then, a total of 4,296 martyrs have been admitted to the Aviation Martyrs' Cemetery.

== Layout ==
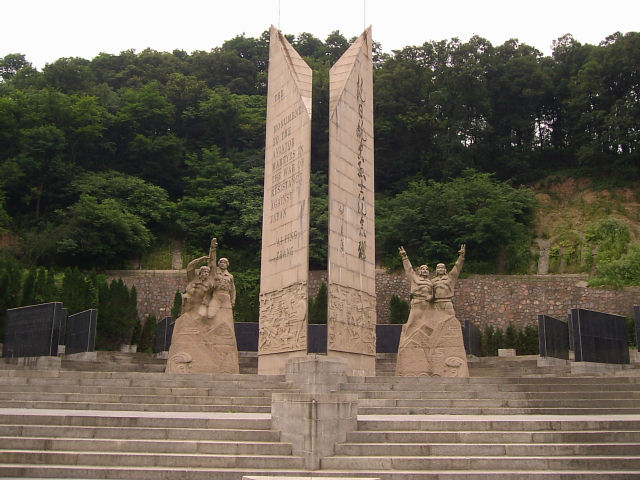
Anti-Japanese Aviation Martyrs Monument

The Aviation Martyrs' Cemetery faces south, and the main buildings include the pagoda, the left and right precincts (i.e., the two covered aisles on the left and right), the monument pavilion, the altar, the memorial tower, and the cemetery are located in the same central axis.

The gate of the cemetery is a four-pillar, three-room pagoda (i.e., with four pillars and three partitions). On the front of the plaque are the words "Aviation Martyrs' Cemetery" and on the back are the words "Serving the Nation with Loyalty"; on the pillars of the pagoda there is an elegiac couplet inscribed by Chiang Kai-shek, which reads, "The fame of the flying general will be passed down through the ages. The righteousness of a thousand years strengthen the soul of the country" and the elegiac couplet inscribed by He Yingqin, "Defending the country in the long sky, great achievements shine in the annals of history; The triumphal burial of loyal bones, the beauty of the monument is comparable to that of Huanghuagang". Behind the pagoda, there are two hipped houses covered with green glazed tiles and a corridor outside. On the pagoda there is a hexagonal pavilion with a green stone tablet inscribed with the words "Save the country by aviation" by Sun Yat-Sen; Behind the pavilion is an altar hall covered with green glazed tiles with lattice windows and doors. In addition, there are two hexagonal pavilions above the altar, one of which has a stone tablet made of Chinese white jade with an inscription written by Huang Bingheng on the front, with the names of those who contributed to the construction of the cemetery and the amount of the contribution written on the back. On the front of another monument, the process of restoring and adding to the cemetery is written, and on the back, the names of the donors and the number of their contributions are also shown.

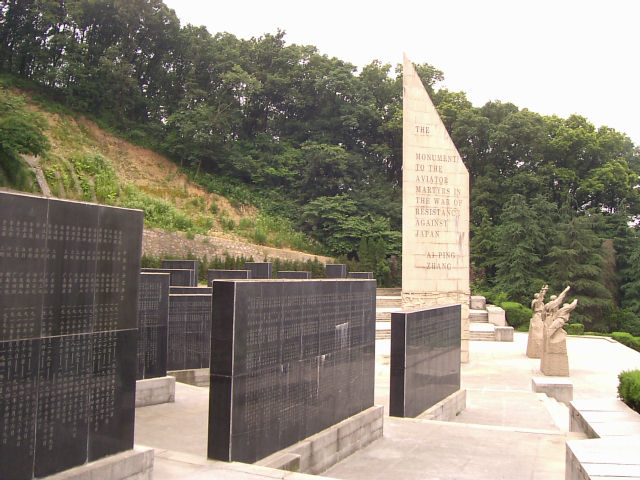
Stele with names of martyrs

There are 24 headstones lined up on concrete paths above the altar and four Soviet Air Force Volunteer Corps headstones, which are topped by 118 more headstones built on the hillside. Above the tombstone is a fan-shaped platform of about 2,000 square meters, in the centre of which is a 15-meter-tall monument to the martyrs of anti-Japanese aviation, which was inaugurated in 1995. The monument consists of two monoliths on the east and west sides at an acute angle to each other, symbolising a pair of wings of an airplane, and the two monoliths form the letter "V", symbolising victory. The monument to the east bears the English name "Anti-Japanese Aviation Martyrs Memorial Monument", while the monument to the west bears the inscription "Anti-Japanese Aviation Martyrs Memorial Monument" by Zhang Aiping. At the bottom of the monument is a bas-relief depicting Chinese, American, and Soviet airmen resisting the Japanese, two stone sculptures depicting Chinese and Soviet pilots and Chinese and American pilots respectively, and 30 stone tablets with the names, places of origin, and dates of birth and death of the martyrs at the rear.

The cemetery originally had a shrine and a memorial tower with a statue of an eagle at the top of the tower, but they were all burned by the Japanese.

== Protection and Development ==
Although the Aviation Martyrs' Cemetery suffered major damage during the Second Sino-Japanese War and the Cultural Revolution, it has been restored and even commented as "better than the original appearance". Aviation Martyrs' Cemetery was listed as a cultural relics protection unit in Nanjing in 1992.

Nanjing Municipal People's Government started to build the Nanjing Anti-Japanese Aviation Martyrs Memorial Hall at the northern foot of Zhong Shan in 2008 and completed it in September 2009. The Memorial Hall occupies an area of over 40,000 square meters and has a floor space of 2,200 square meters. The entire memorial consists of a triangular, sloping frame, which looks like the wing of a fighter jet about to take off. Outside the pavilion is a giant sculpture called "God of Justice," a man with three heads and six arms who holds a bow and arrow and rides on a flying tiger. The memorial hall has four indoor pavilions with the themes of "Fighting the War", "International Aid to China", "Ambition", and "Remembering the Martyrs", as well as two outdoor pavilions displaying models and sculptures of warplanes. This memorial is the first museum in the world dedicated to the martyrs of anti-Japanese aviation.
