= Xiao Mausoleum =

UNESCO World Heritage Site
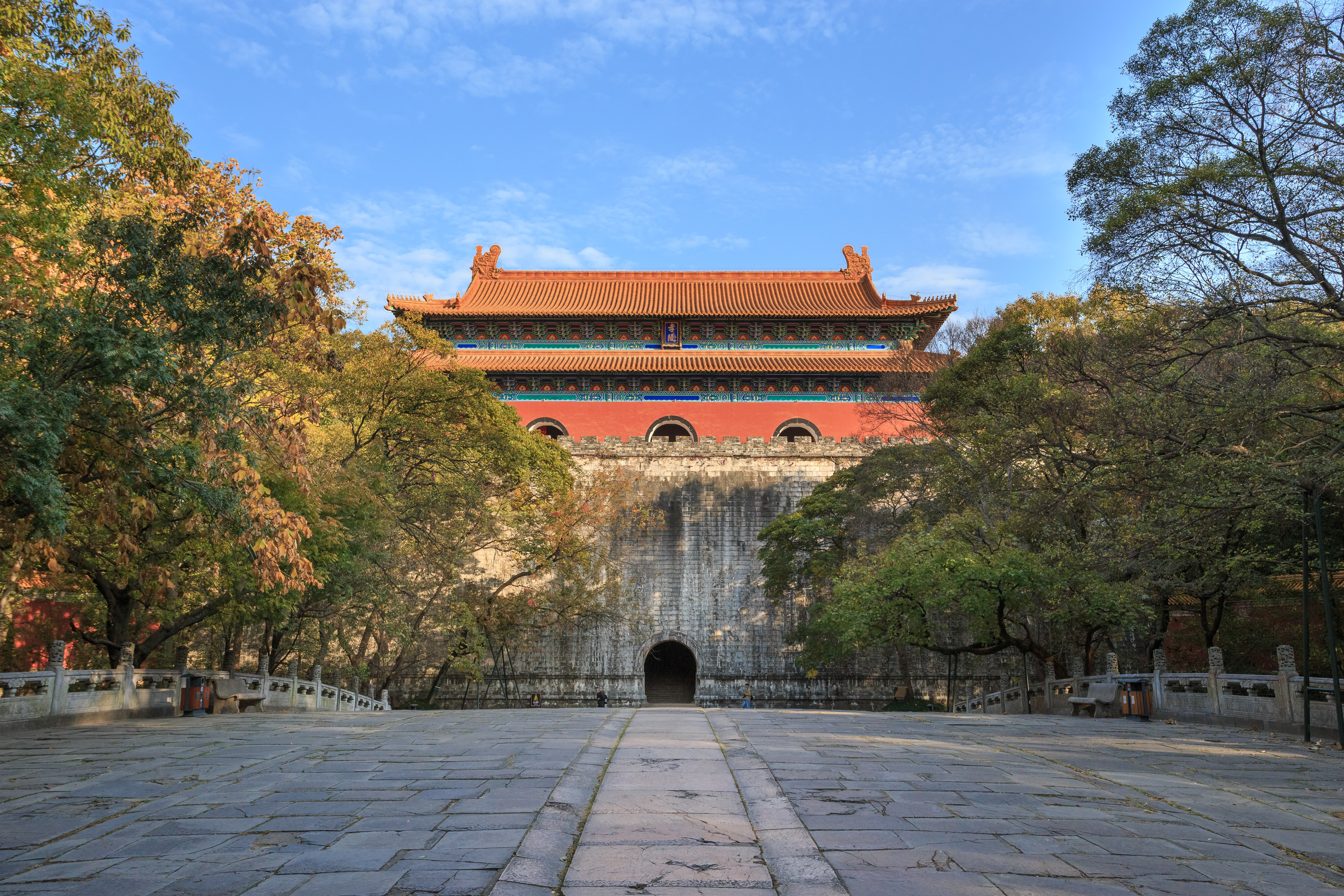
- Ming Lou, the main building of Ming Xiaoling Mausoleum

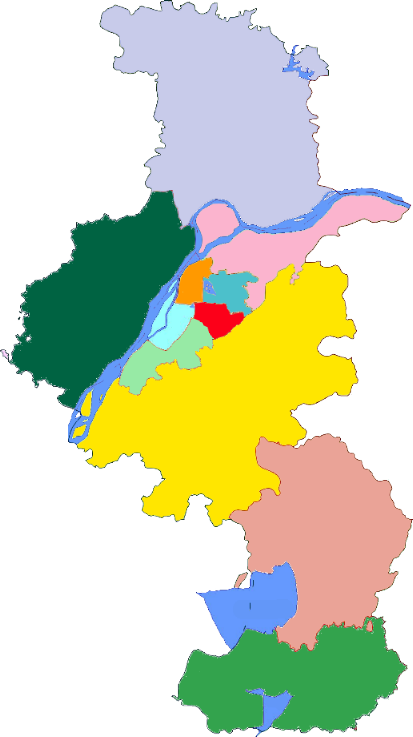
- Location within Nanjing Location within Jiangsu
- Official name: Xiaoling Tomb including area from Treasure Mound to Shenlieshan Stele, including Plum Blossom Hill, and Big Golden Gate
- Location: Xuanwu District, Nanjing, Jiangsu, China
- Part of: Imperial Tombs of the Ming and Qing Dynasties
- Criteria: Cultural: (i)(ii)(iii)(iv)(vi)
- Reference: 1004ter-005
- Inscription: 2000 (24th Session)
- Extensions: 2003, 2004
- Area: 116 ha (290 acres)
- Coordinates: 32°03′30″N 118°50′23″E

The Ming Xiaoling (Chinese: 明孝陵; pinyin: Míng Xiào Líng; lit. 'Filial mausoleum of Ming') is the mausoleum of the Hongwu Emperor, the founder of the Ming dynasty. It lies at the southern foot of Purple Mountain, located east of the historical centre of Nanjing. The legend says that in order to prevent robbery of the tomb, 13 identical processions of funeral troops started from 13 city gates to obscure the real burying site.

The construction of the mausoleum began during the Hongwu Emperor's life in 1381 (645 years ago) and ended in 1405 (621 years ago), during the reign of his son the Yongle Emperor, with a huge expenditure of resources involving 100,000 labourers. The original wall of the mausoleum was more than 22.5 kilometres long. The mausoleum was built under heavy guard of 5,000 troops.

== Layout and monuments ==
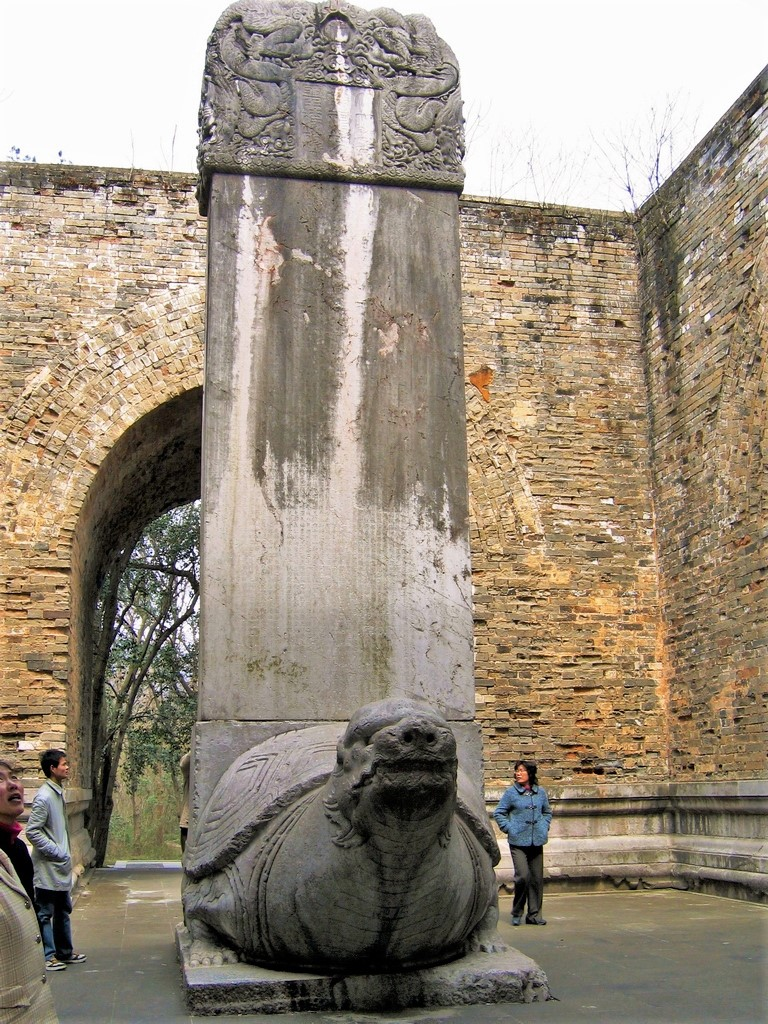
The Shengong Shengde stele in the Sifangcheng pavilion, prior to the reconstruction of the roof

=== Great golden gate and Square city ===
Da Jin Men and Sifangcheng. One enters the site through the monumental Great Golden Gates (Da Jin Men), and is soon faced by a giant stone tortoise (bixi), which resides in the Sifangcheng ("Square city") pavilion. The tortoise supports a carved stone stele, crowned by intertwining hornless dragons. The well-preserved stele is known as the "Shengong Shengde Stele" (神功圣德碑), i.e., literally, "The Stele of Godly Merit and Saintly Virtue". The inscription of the stele, extolling the merits and virtues of the Hongwu Emperor was written by his fourth son, the Yongle Emperor. The tortoise is 5.15 metres (16.9 ft) long, 2.54 metres (8 ft 4 in) wide and 2.8 metres (9 ft 2 in) tall, the stele stands 8.78 metres (28.8 ft) tall (including the tortoise) and is one of the best-known examples of its genre.

It is thought that originally the Yongle Emperor planned to install a much bigger stele here. The work on making it was started in the Yangshan Quarry (some 10 kilometres (6.2 mi) east of the mausoleum) in 1405, but the unfinished stele was abandoned in the quarry, as it was realized that it would not be possible to move it.

Unlike the similar pavilion at the Ming Tombs near Beijing, Nanjing's Sifangcheng roof was once destroyed during the Taiping Rebellion and left unbuilt until 2006. Recently, Chinese engineers have conducted research in regard to the possibility of restoring the roof, which was then eventually restored in between 2007-2009.

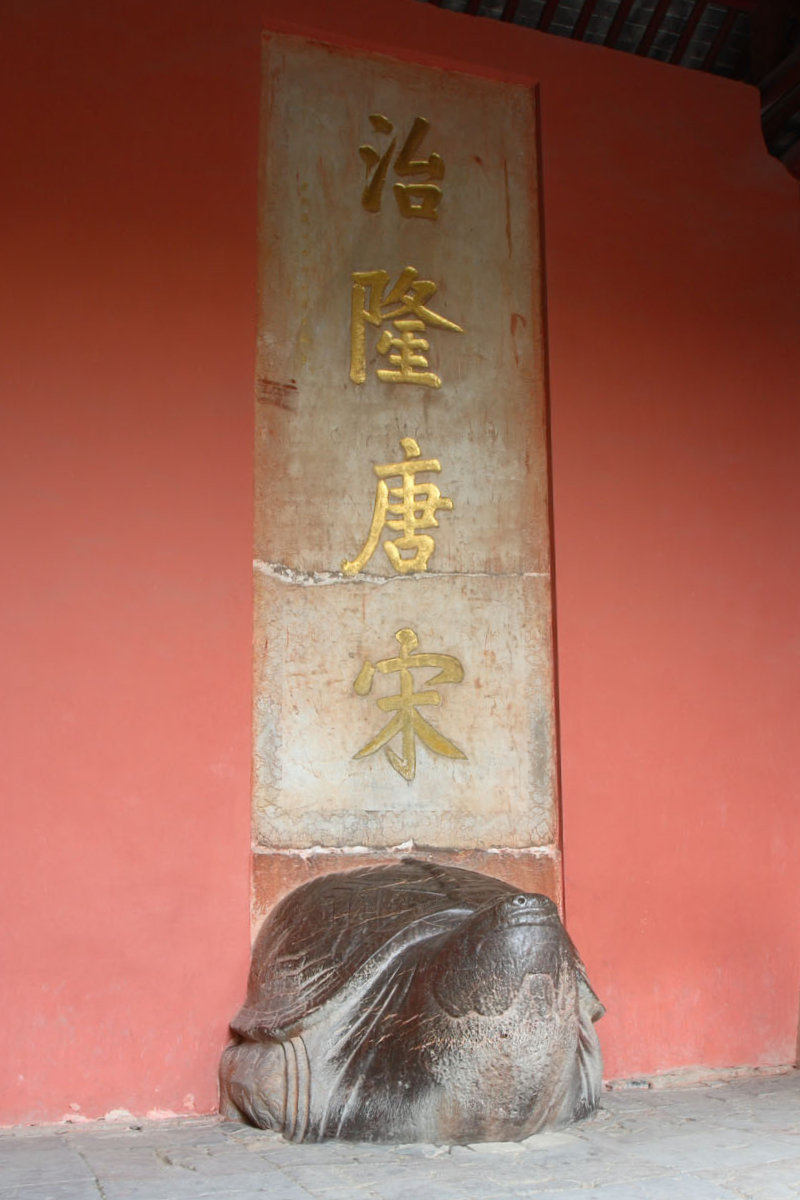
The Kangxi Emperor’s stele of homage to his Ming predecessor of 300 years before

=== The Sacred Way ===
The Sacred Way is an 1,800-metre (5,900 ft)-long road at the Nanjing city Government site. The winding Sacred Way (Shendao) starts near the Sifangcheng pavilion. It includes several sections: the Elephant Road and the Wengzhong Road. The Elephant Road is lined by 12 pairs of 6 kinds of animals (lions, xiezhi, camels, elephants, qilin, and horses), guarding the tomb. Beyond them is a column called huabiao in Chinese. One then continues along the Wengzhong Road. Four pairs of ministers and generals (or warrior guardian figures, Wengzhong) of stone have been standing there for centuries to guard the journey to the afterlife.

=== Lingxing Gate ===
The Lingxing Gate, a pailou at the end of the Wengzhong Road was destroyed long ago, but rebuilt in 2006.

=== The central area ===
One enters the central area of the mausoleum complex through the Wen Wu Fang Men (The Gate of the Civil and the Military). On an inscribed stone tablet outside of the gate an official notification of the local government in the Qing dynasty (1644–1911) is ordered to protect the tomb. Inside the gate, there is the Tablet Hall (Bei Dian) in which five steles stand. The one in the middle, also mounted on a stone tortoise, is inscribed with four Chinese characters, "治隆唐宋", which were written by the Qing dynasty's Kangxi Emperor on his third inspection tour of the South in 1699. The text is interpreted as alluding to the greatness of the Ming dynasty founder Zhu Yuanzhang, matching (or surpassing) that of the founders of the Tang and Song Dynasties of old.

Behind the pavilion, there used to be other annexes; however, most of them have collapsed into relics from which the original splendor can still be traced. The emperor and his queen were buried in a clay tumulus, 400 metres (1,300 ft) in diameter, known as the Lone Dragon Hill (Du Long Fu). A stone wall with a terrace on top, known as Ming Lou (Ming Mansion) or the Soul Tower is half-embedded into the front face of the tumulus. On a stone wall surrounding the vault, 7 Chinese characters were inscribed, identifying the mausoleum of Emperor Ming Taizu (respected title of Emperor Zhu Yuanzhang).

The mountain to the south of the tomb, known as Meihua Shan ("Plum Flower Mountain"), is the mausoleum of Sun Quan, King of the Kingdom of Wu in the Three Kingdoms period (220-265). The existence of this tomb is the reason why the Sacred Way is not straight.

== Later history ==
The mausoleum complex suffered damage during the mid-19th century Taiping Civil War, but was partially restored during the Tongzhi era thereafter.

Along with the Ming Tombs north of Beijing, the Ming Xiaoling Mausoleum of Nanjing was inscribed by UNESCO as part of the World Heritage Sites "Imperial Tombs of the Ming and Qing Dynasties".

== Gallery ==
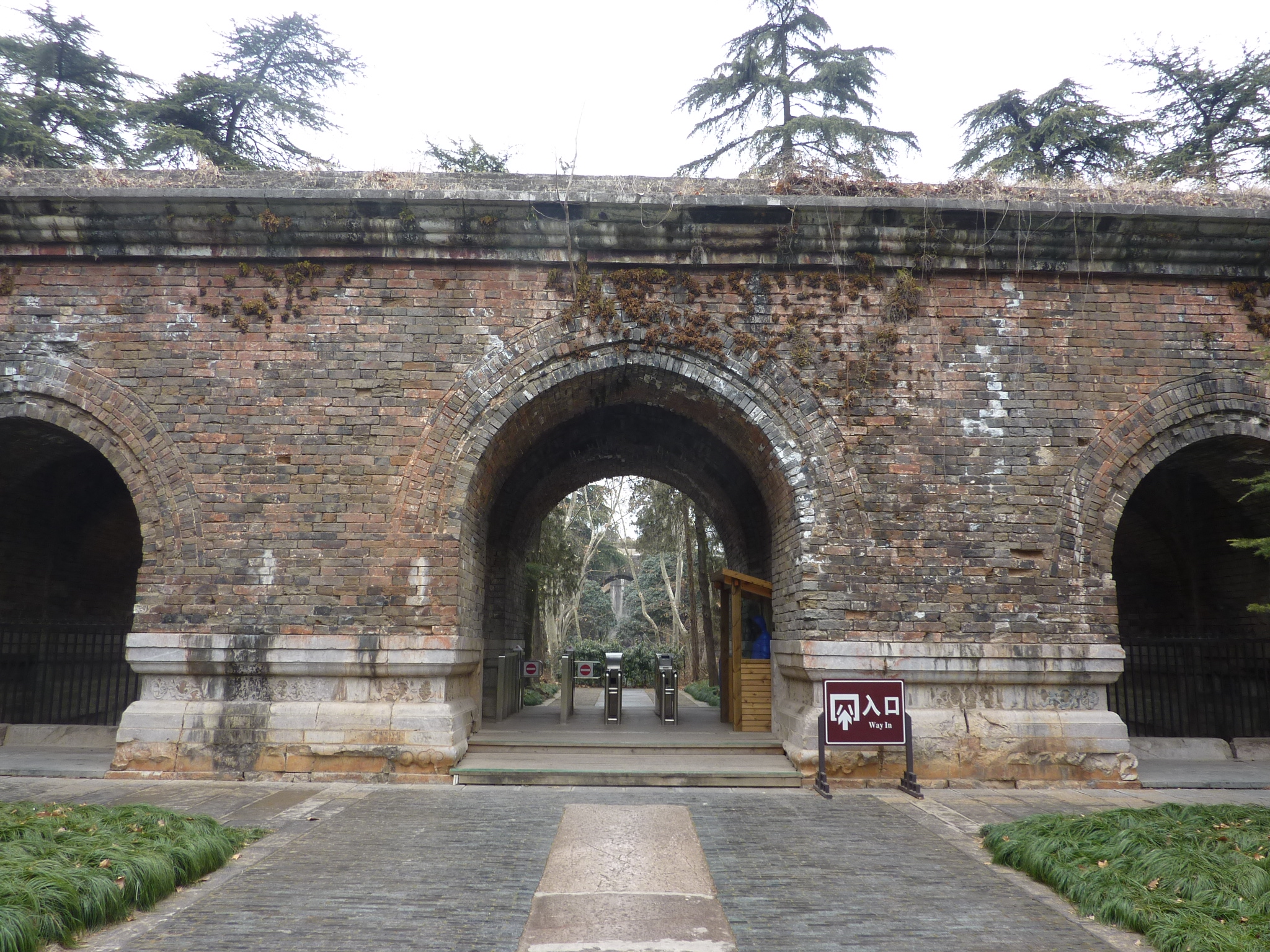
Da Jin Men (The Great Golden Gates), the main entrance to the site

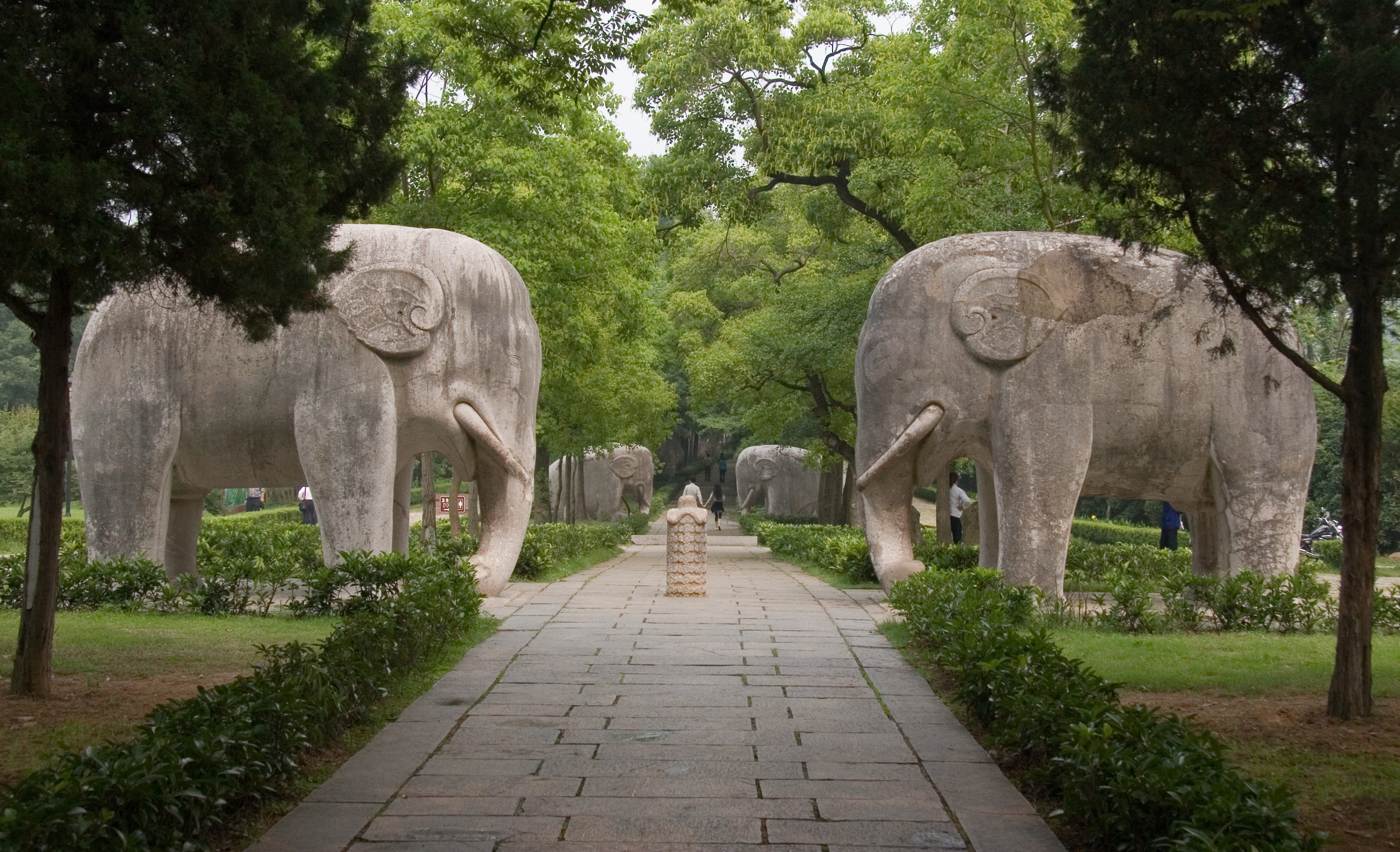
"Elephant Road" (or Spirit Way)

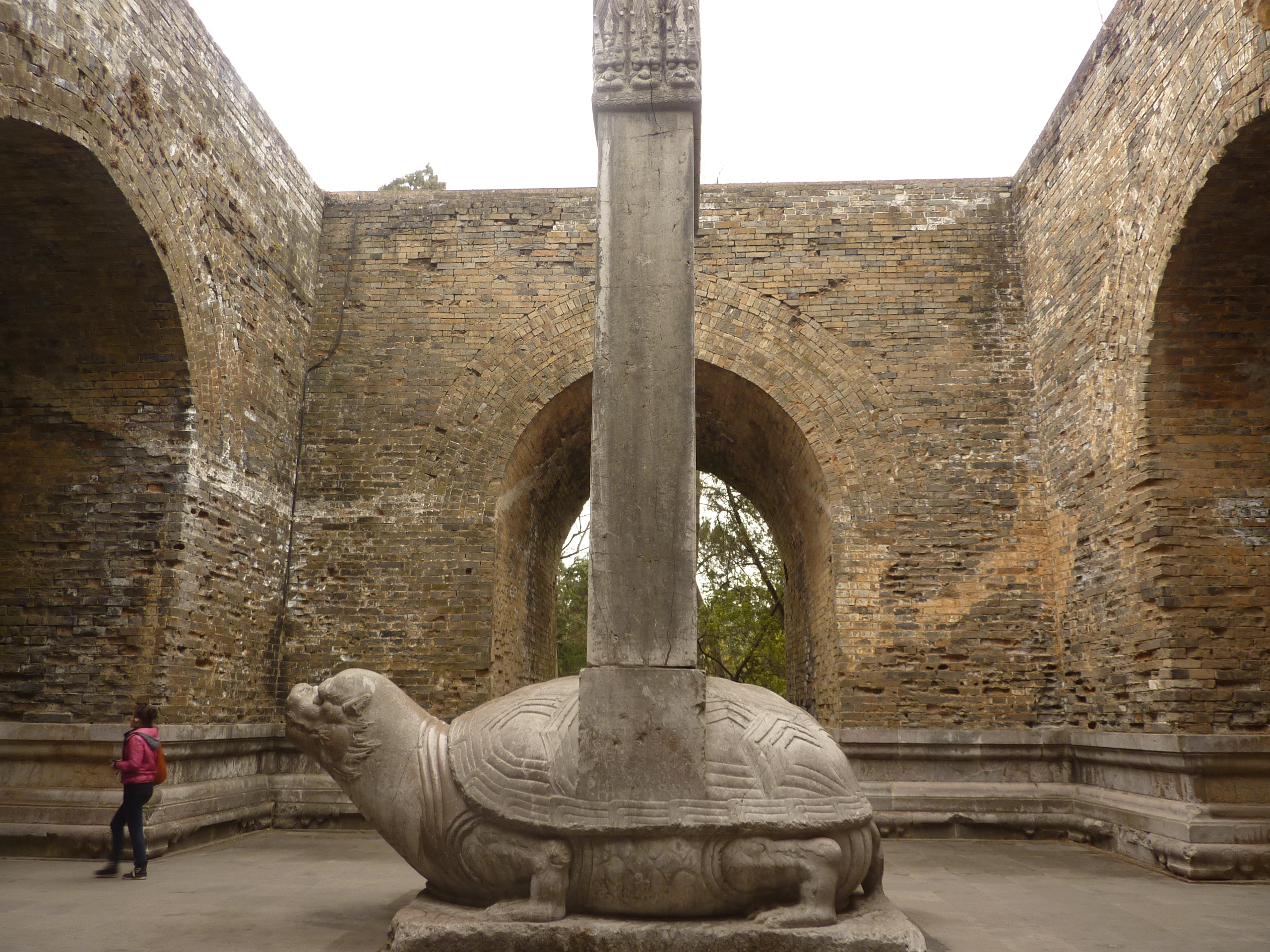
The Sifangcheng ("Square City") pavilion

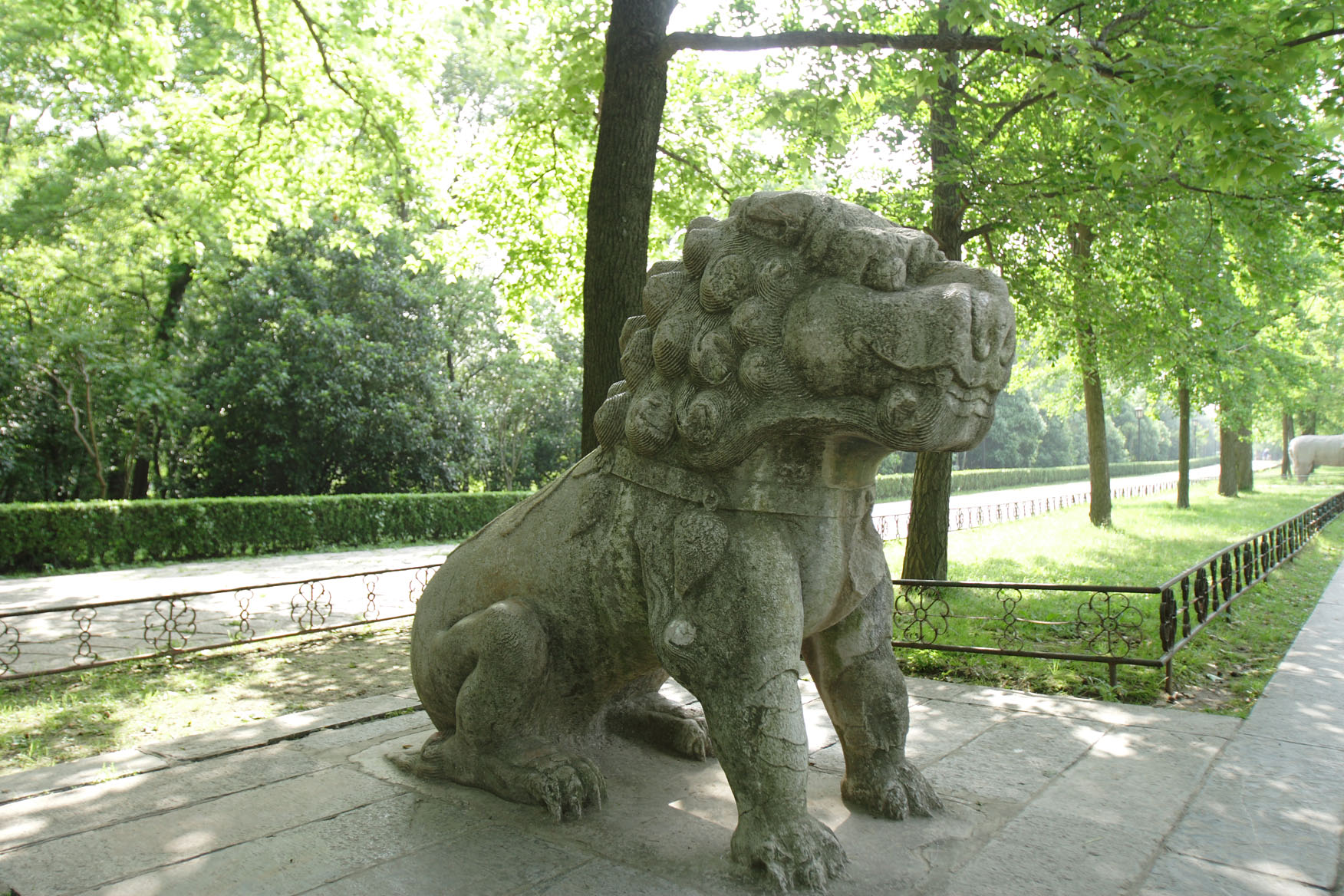
A stone lion on the Spirit Way

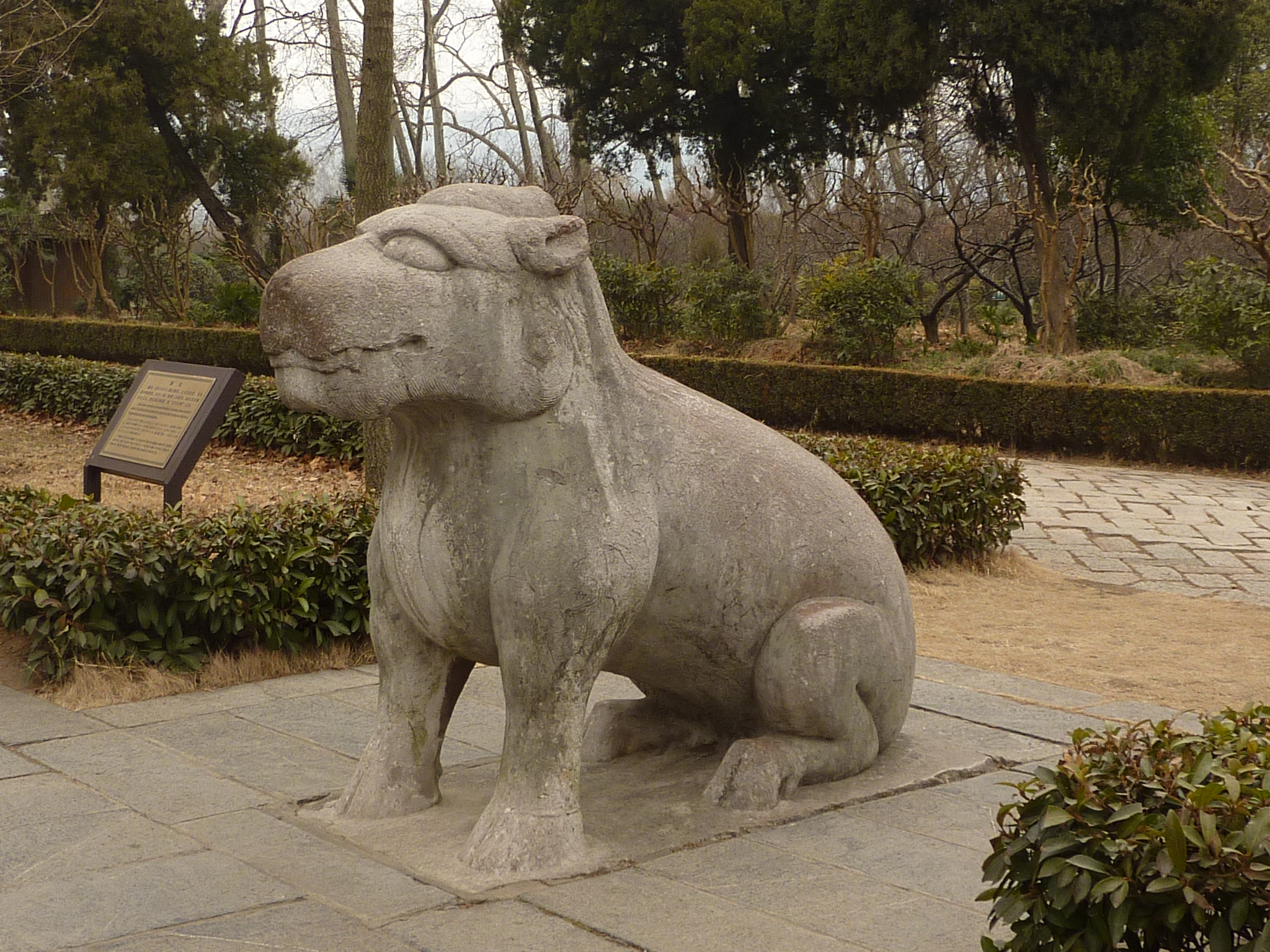
A xiezhi on the "Elephant Road"

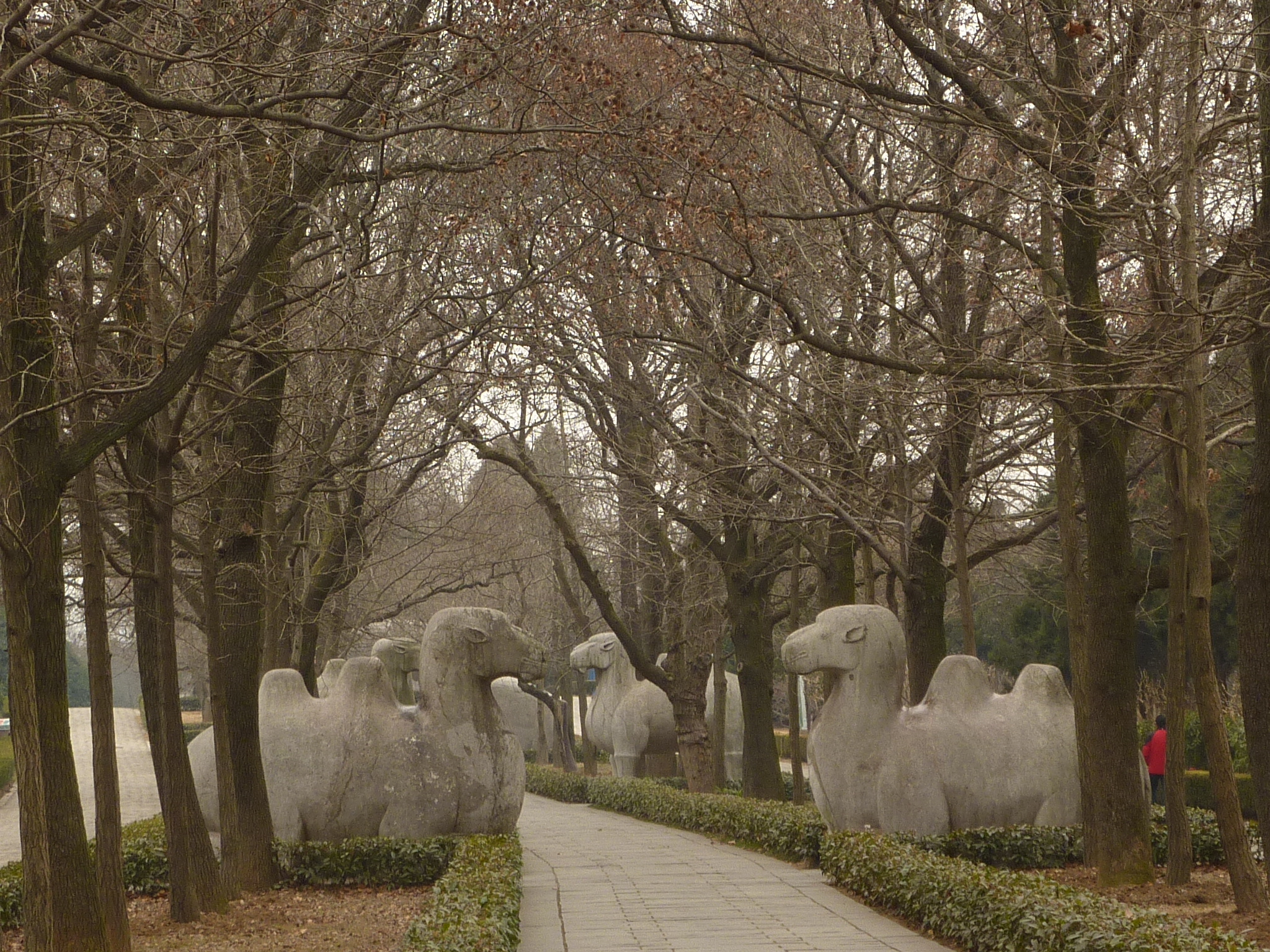
Camels along the "Elephant Road"

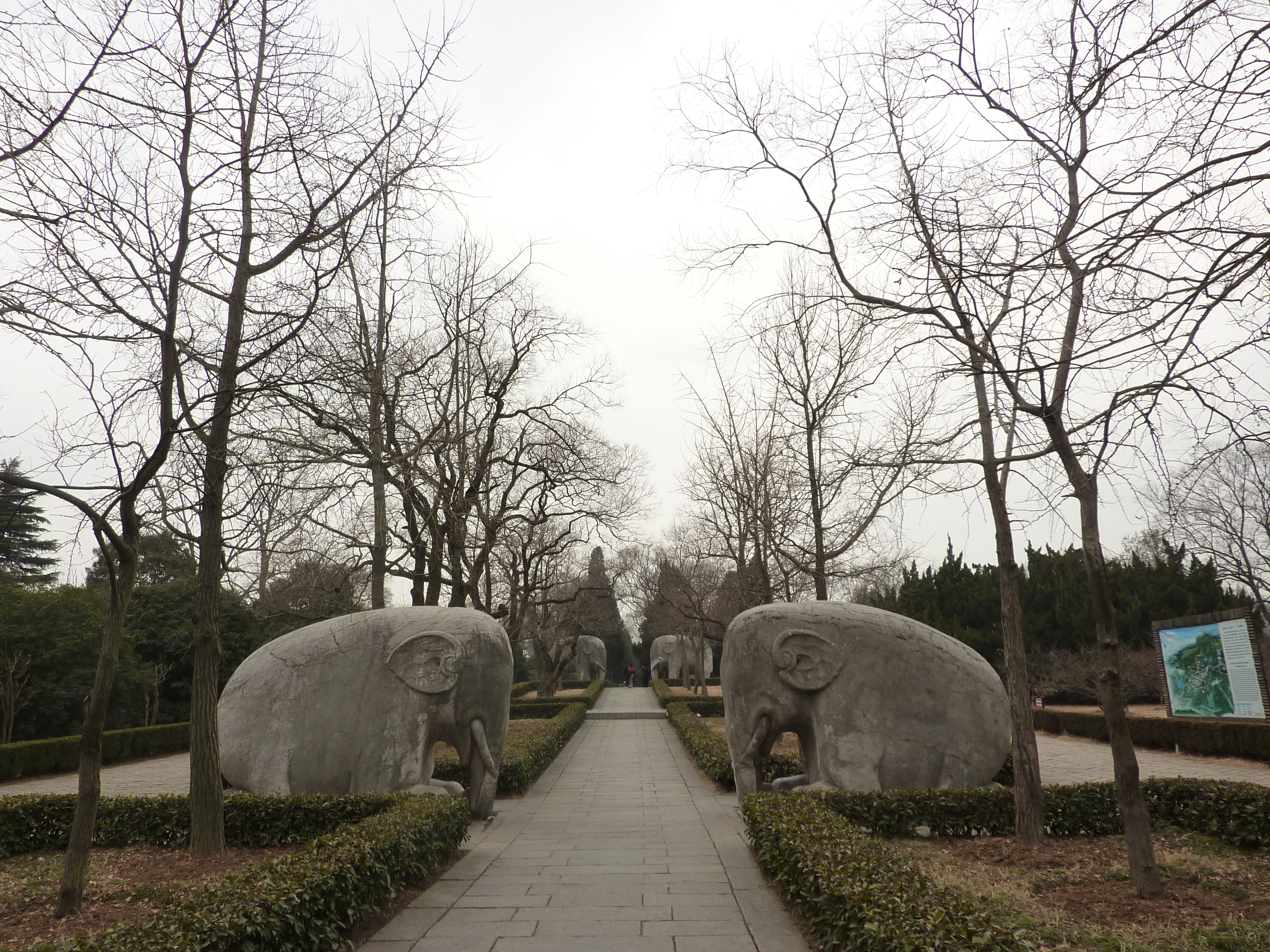
Elephants along the "Elephant Road"

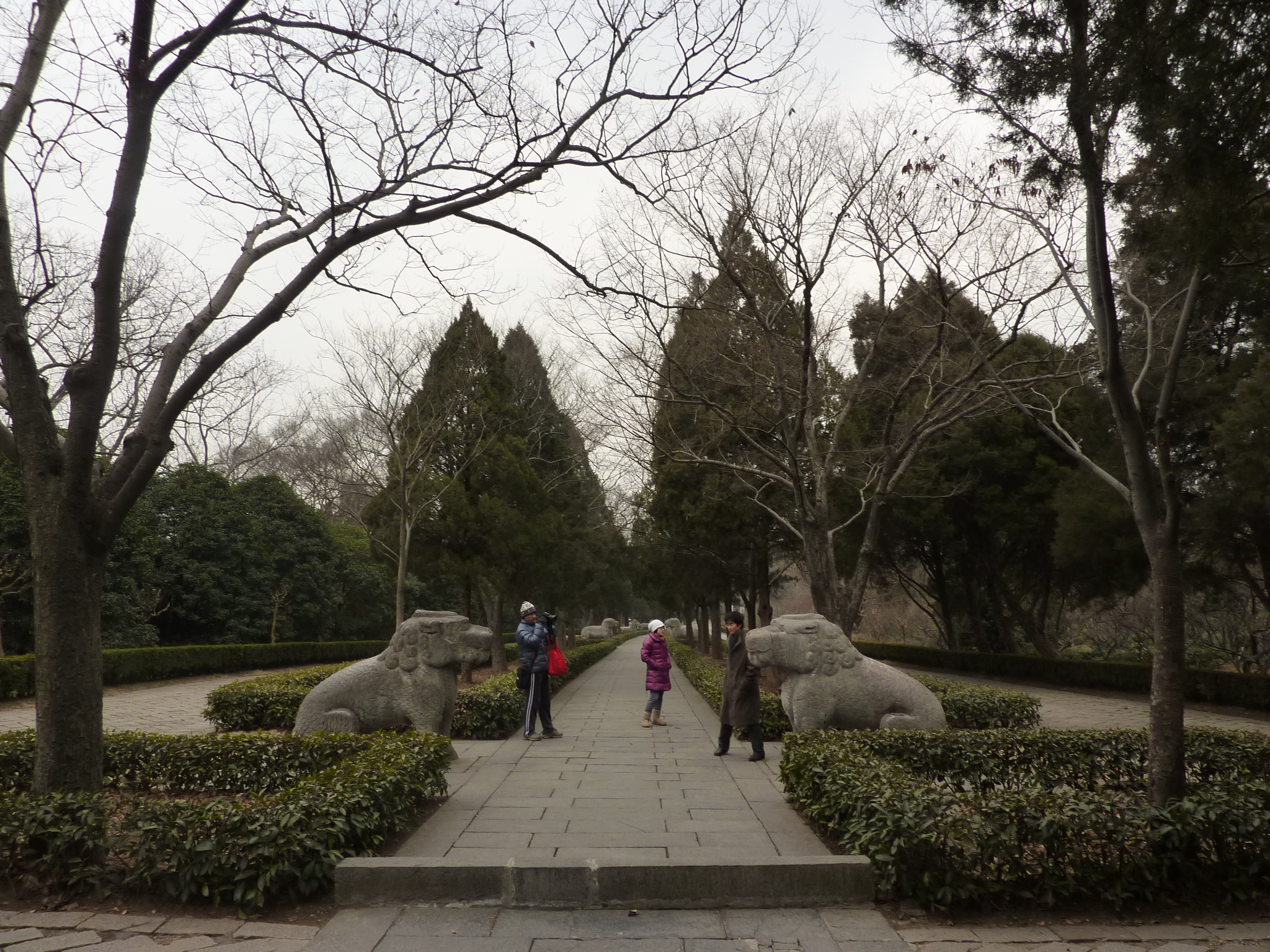
Qilin along the "Elephant Road"

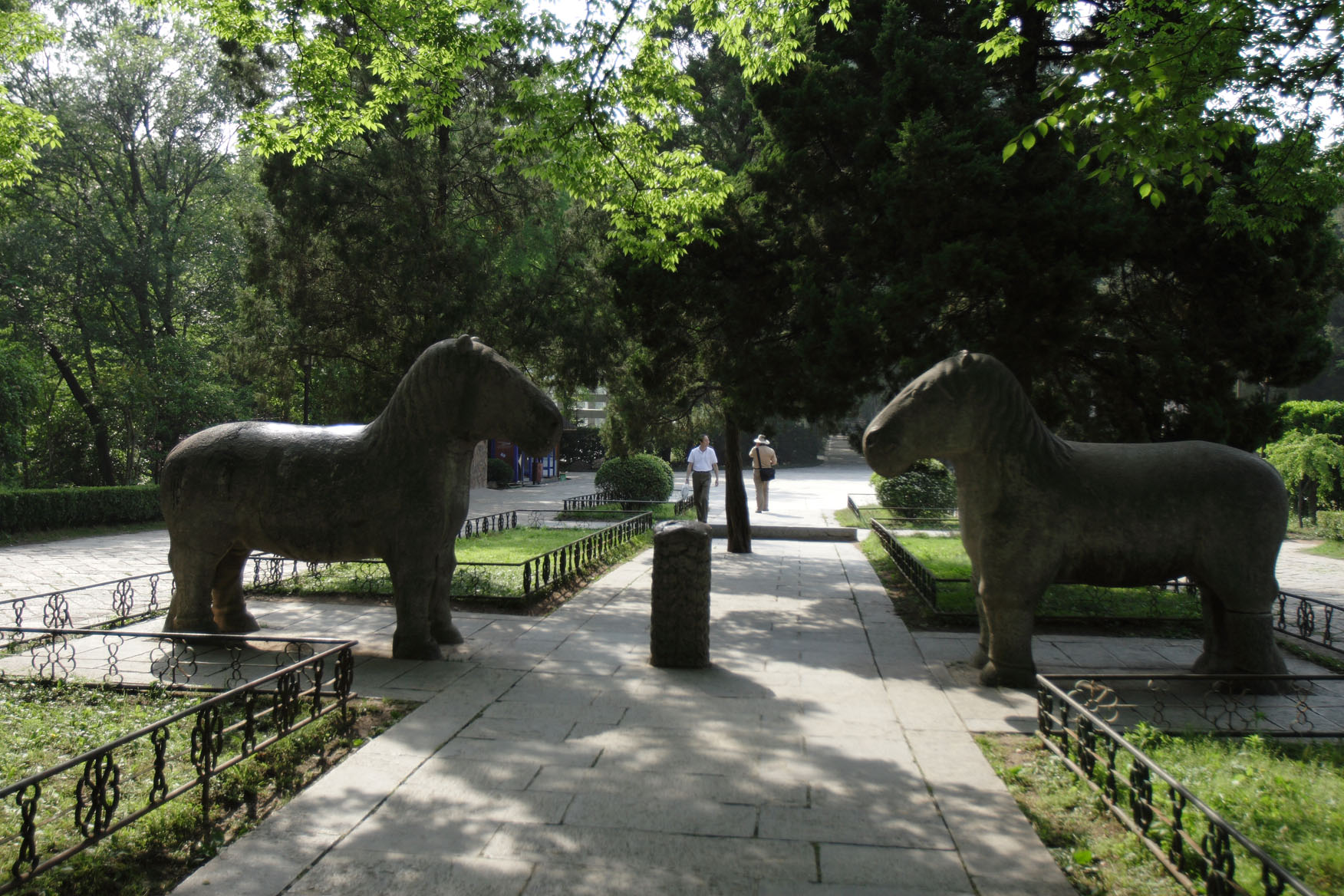
Horses along the "Elephant Road"

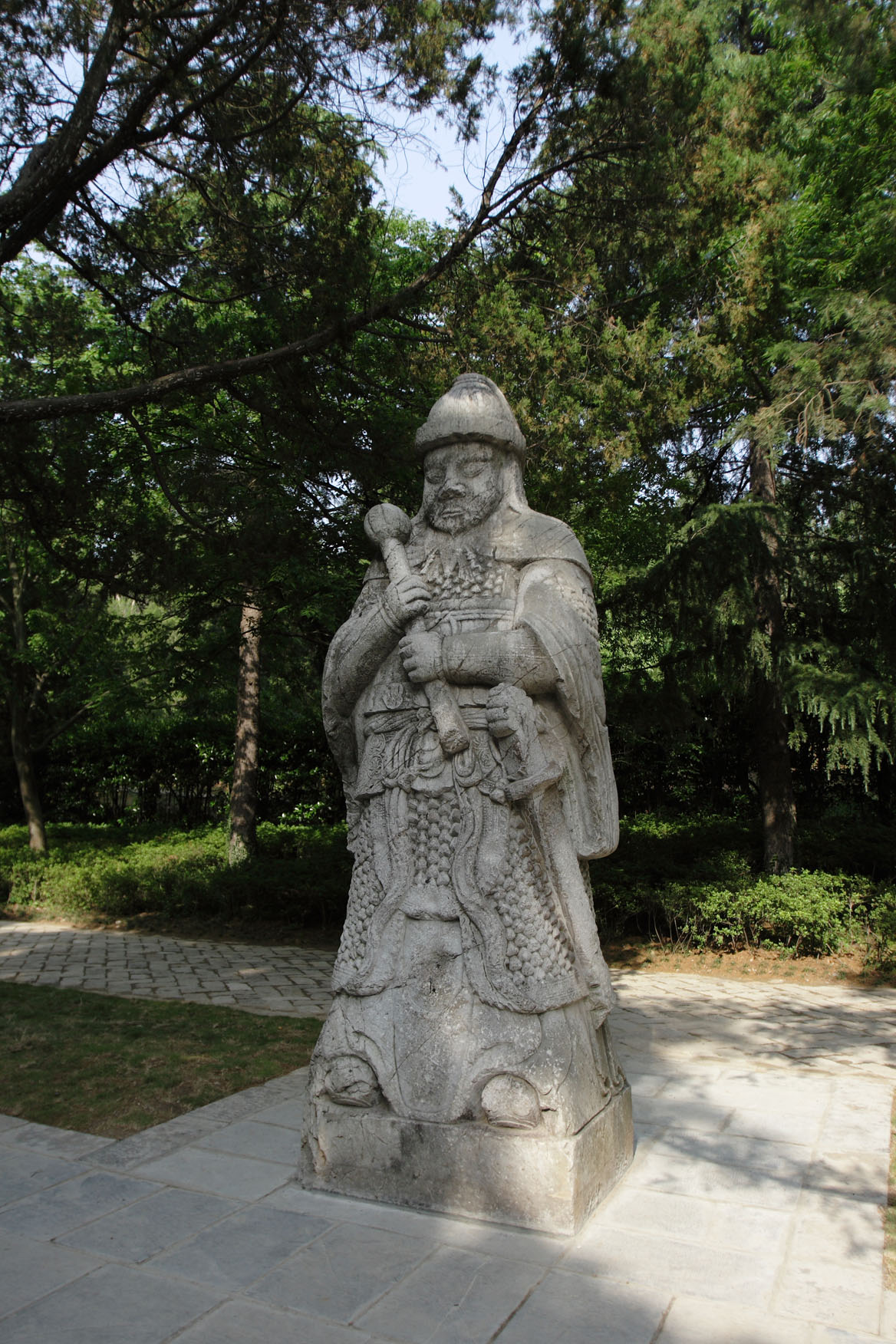
Statue of a military official on the Spirit Way

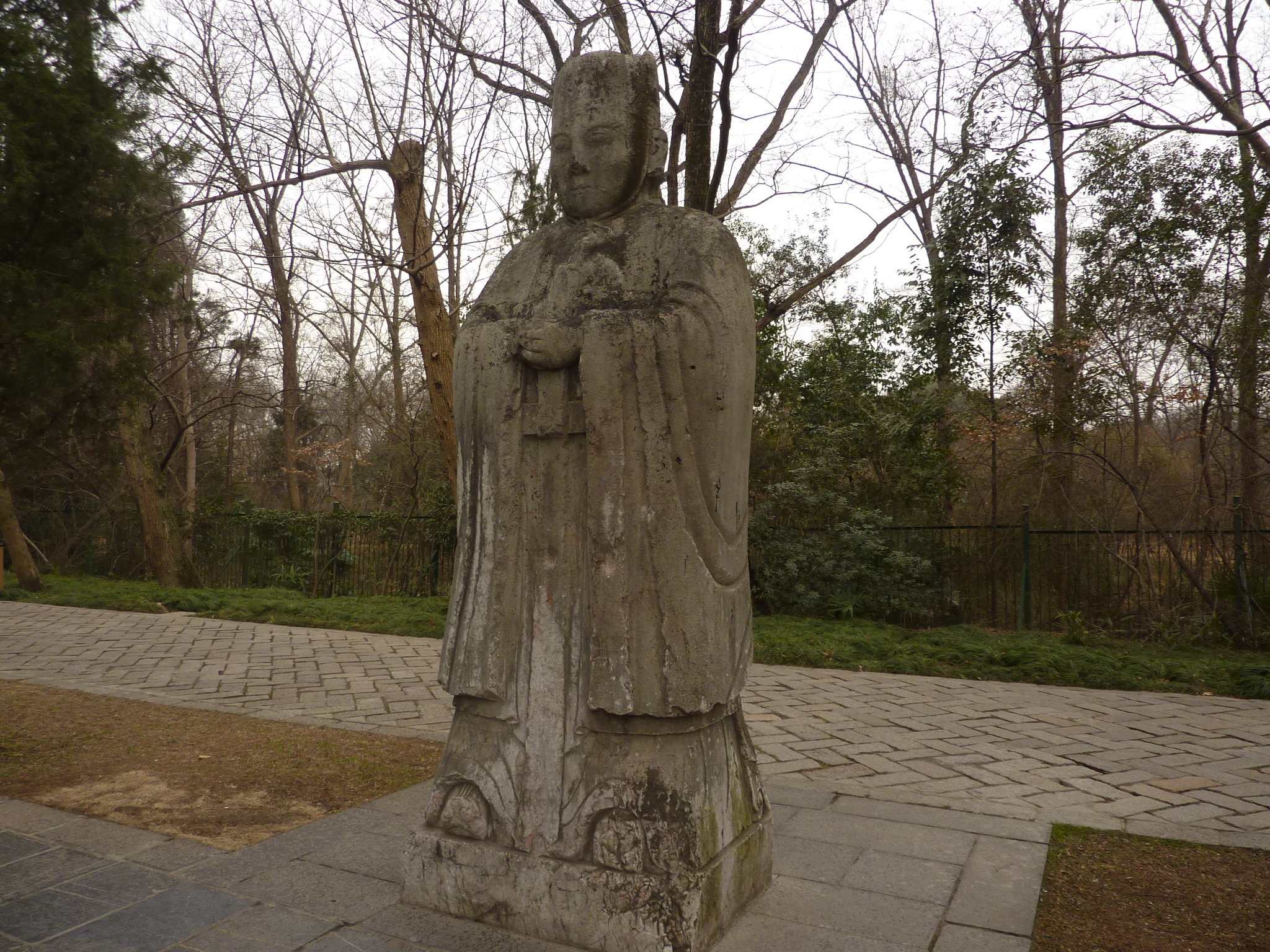
A civil official on the "Wengzhong Road"

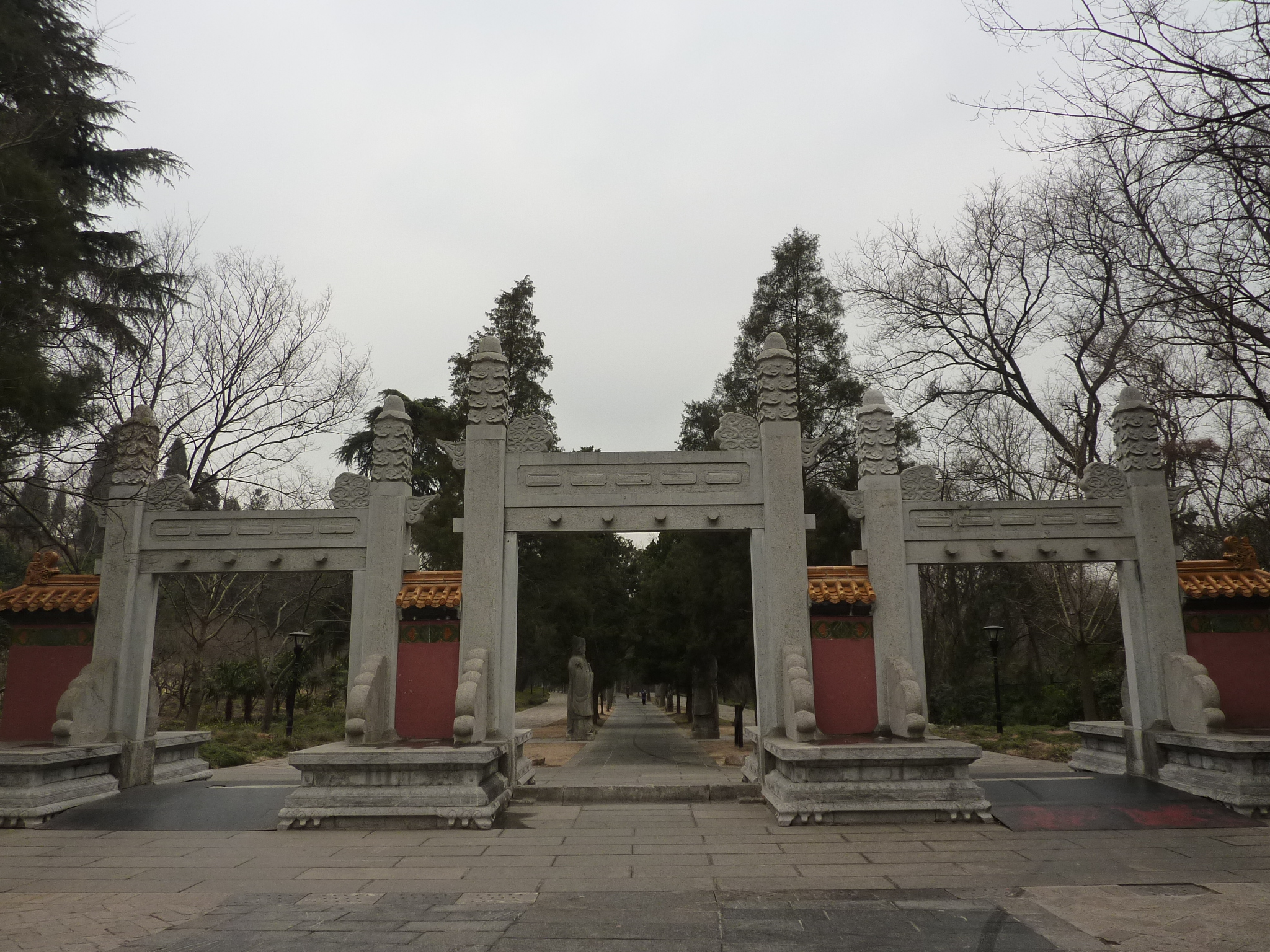
Lingxing Gate at the end of the "Wengzhong Road"

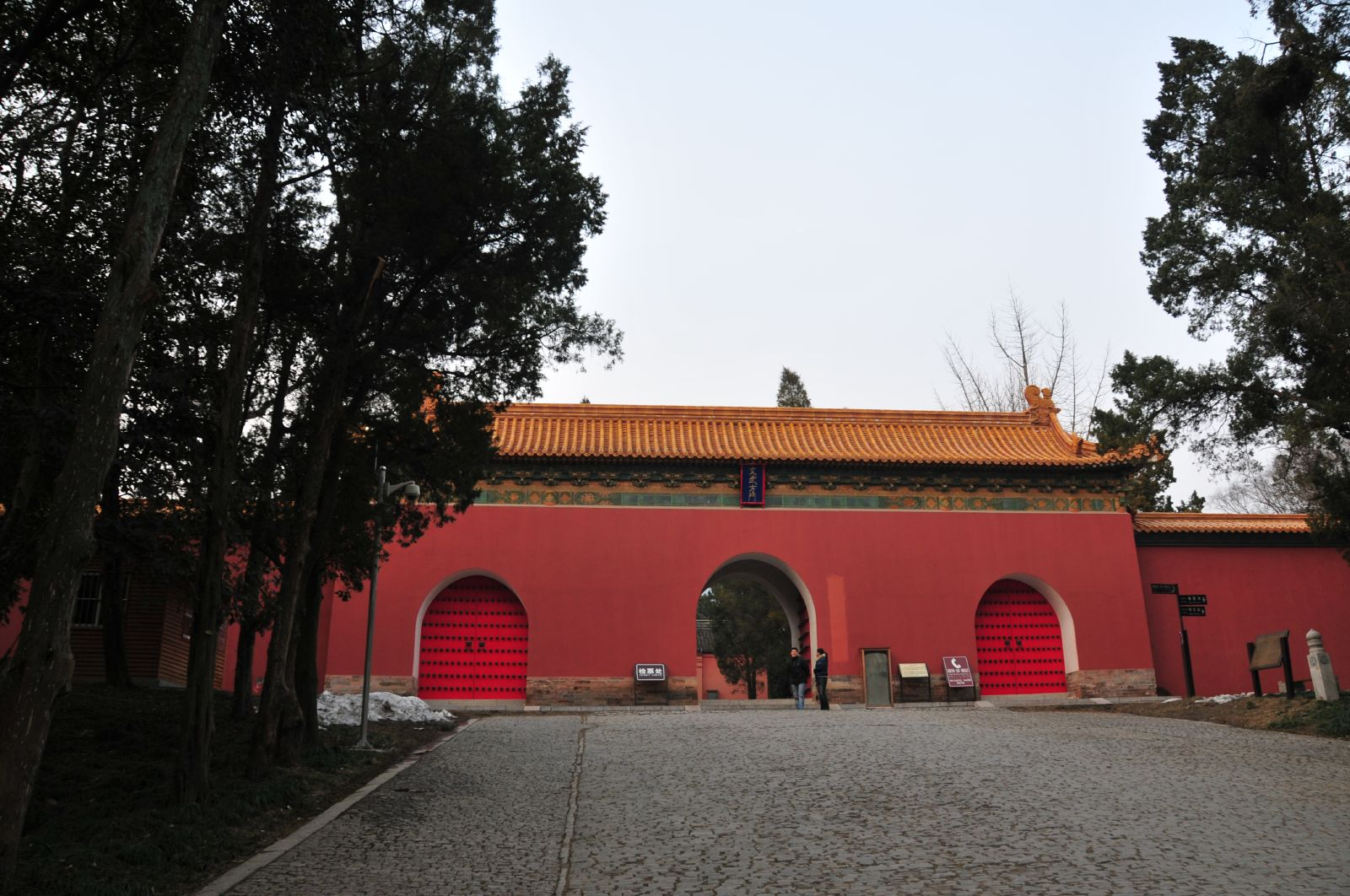
The Wenwu Fangmen gate

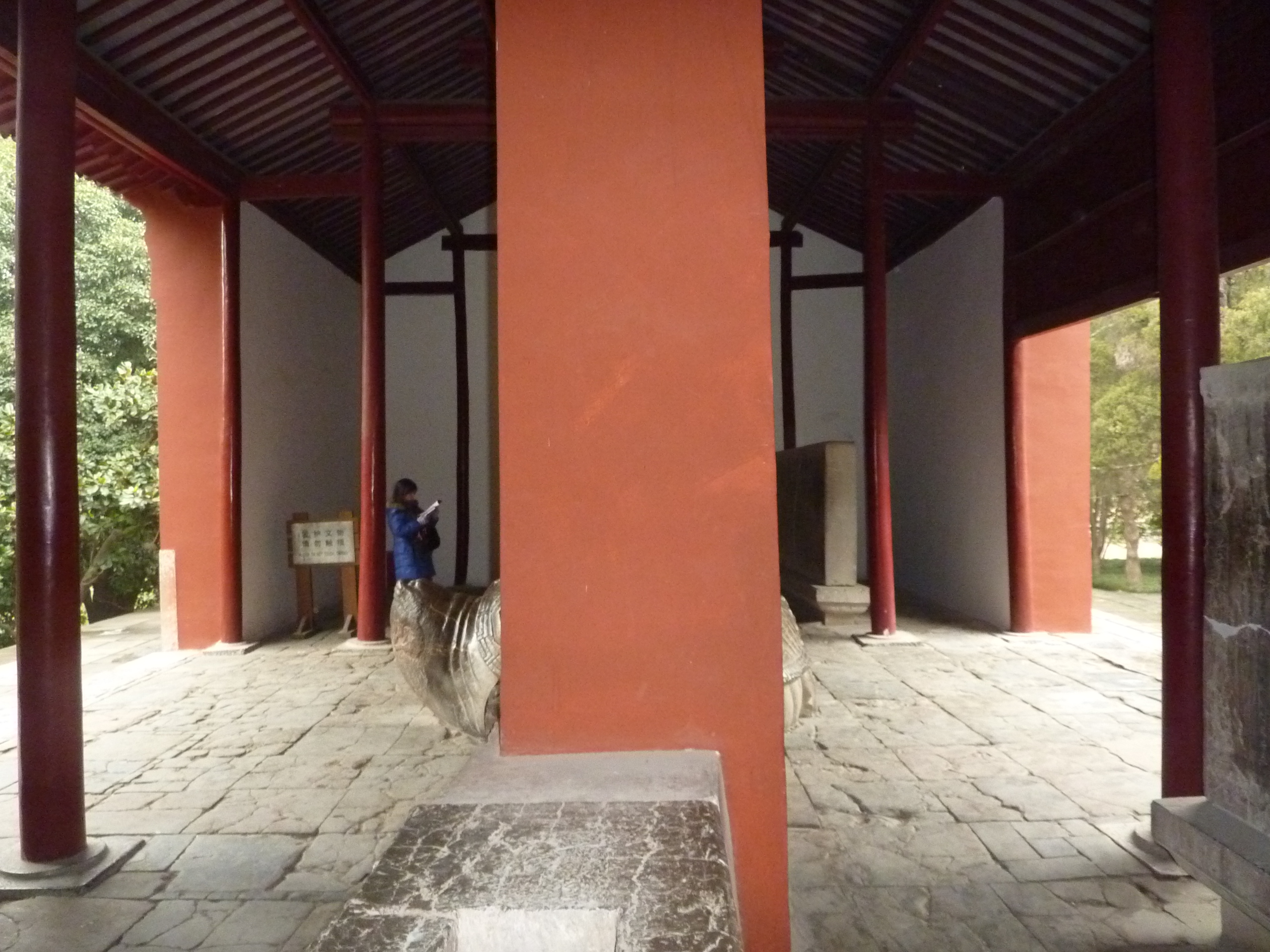
The Tablet Hall, with the tortoise left behind by the Kangxi Emperor

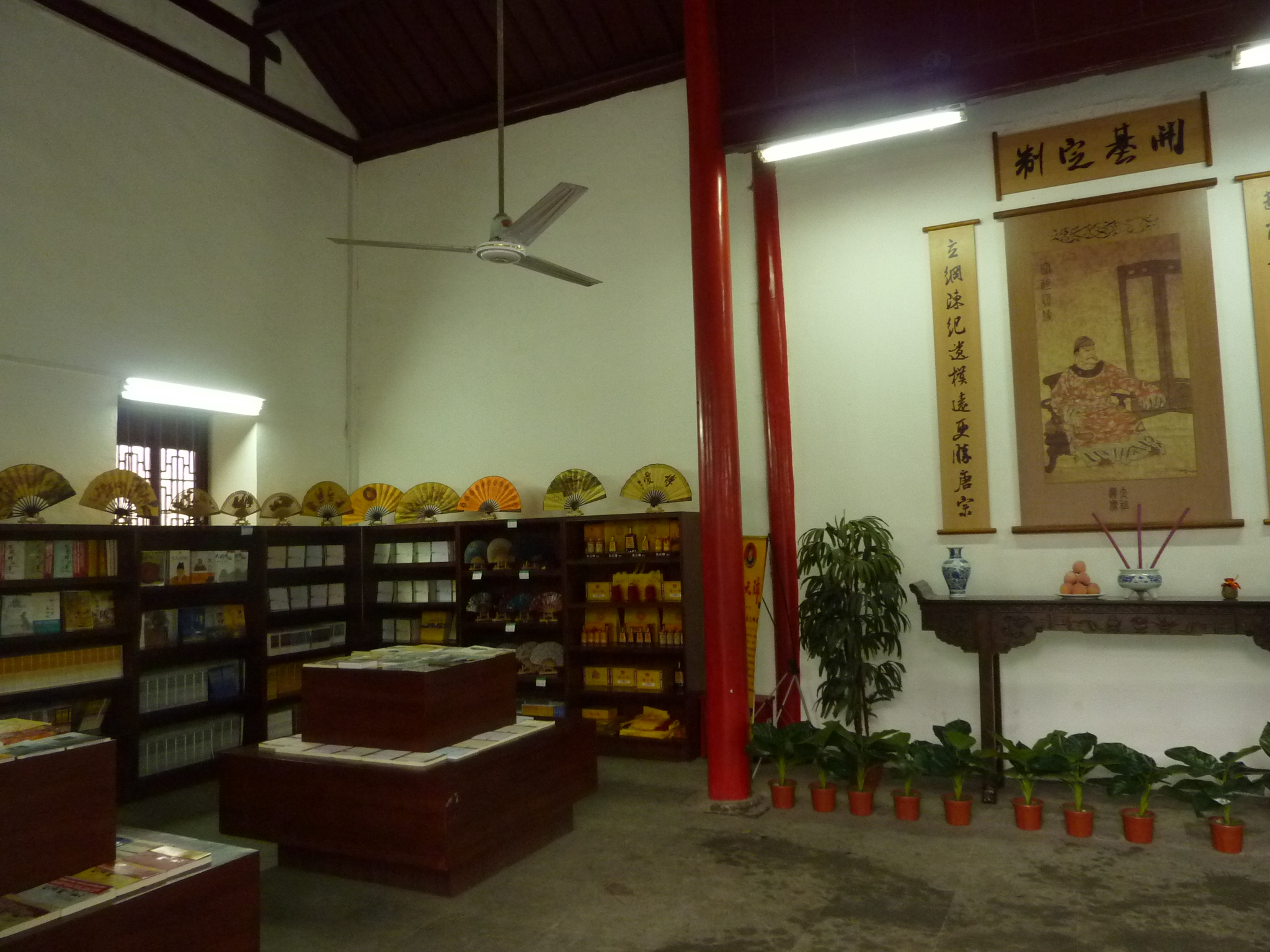
Inside the Ting Dian ("Pavilion Hall"), which replaces the old Xiaoling Hall

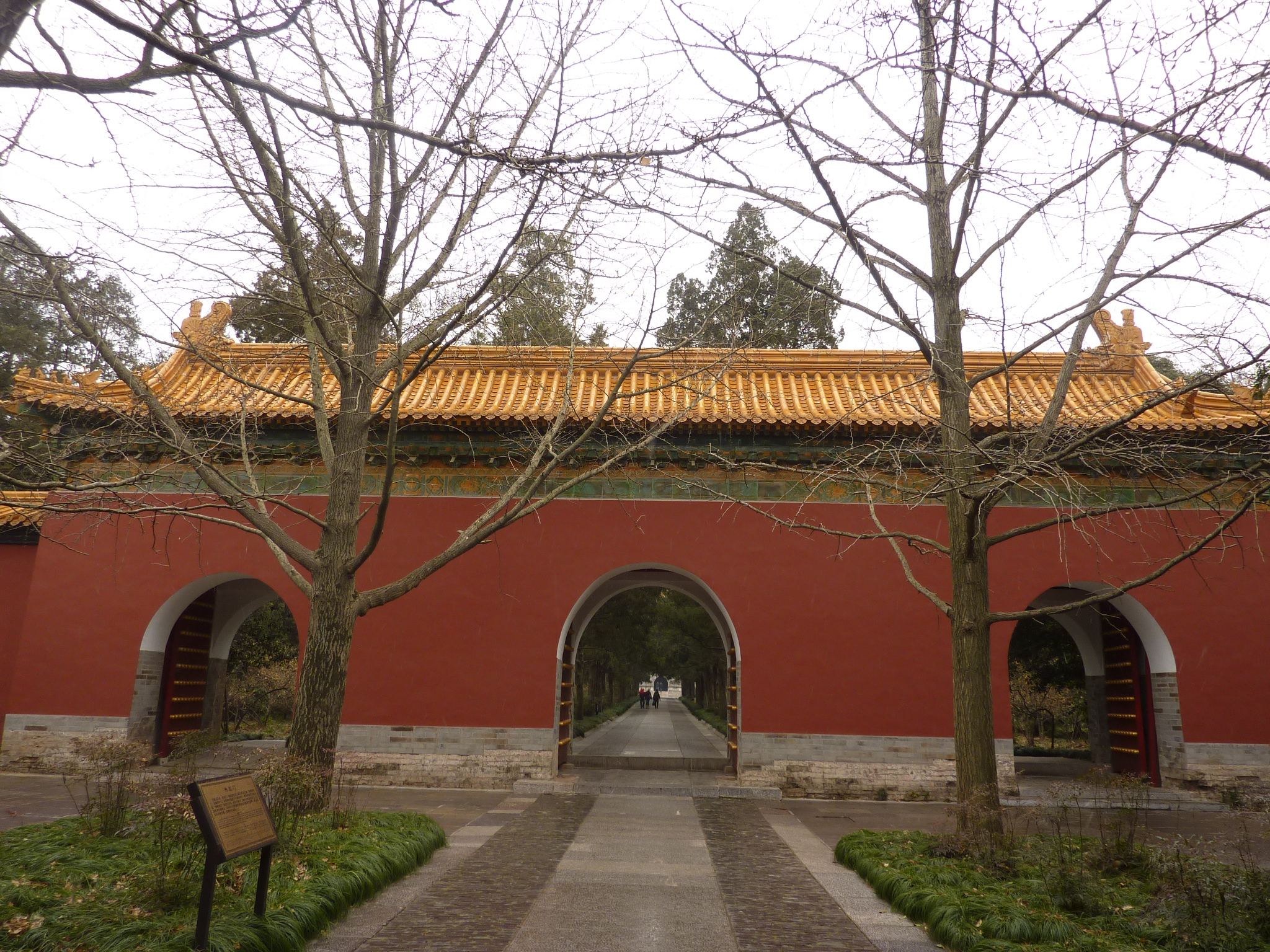
Nei Hong Men (The Inner Red Gate)

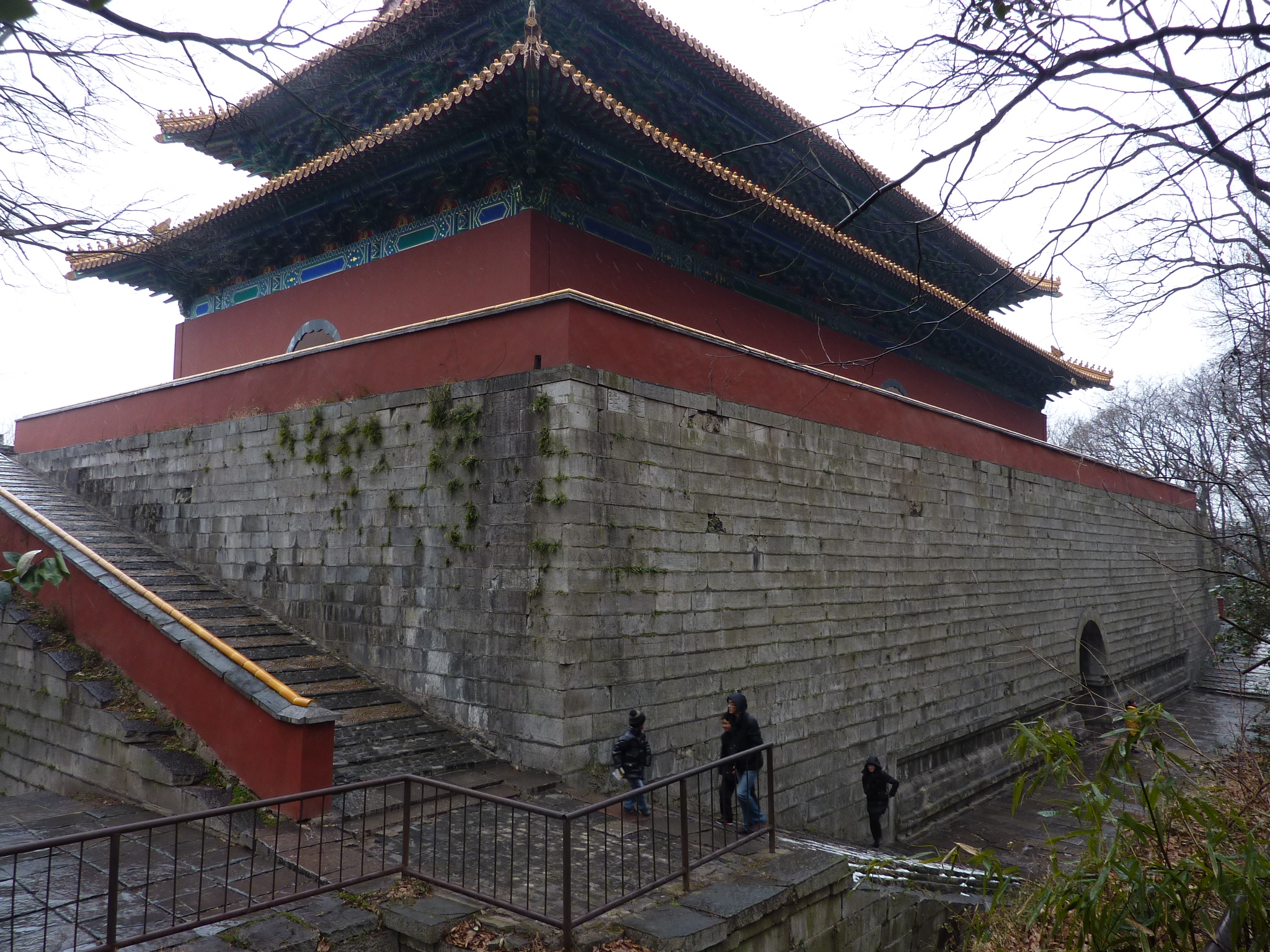
The Soul Tower on top of the Ming Lou

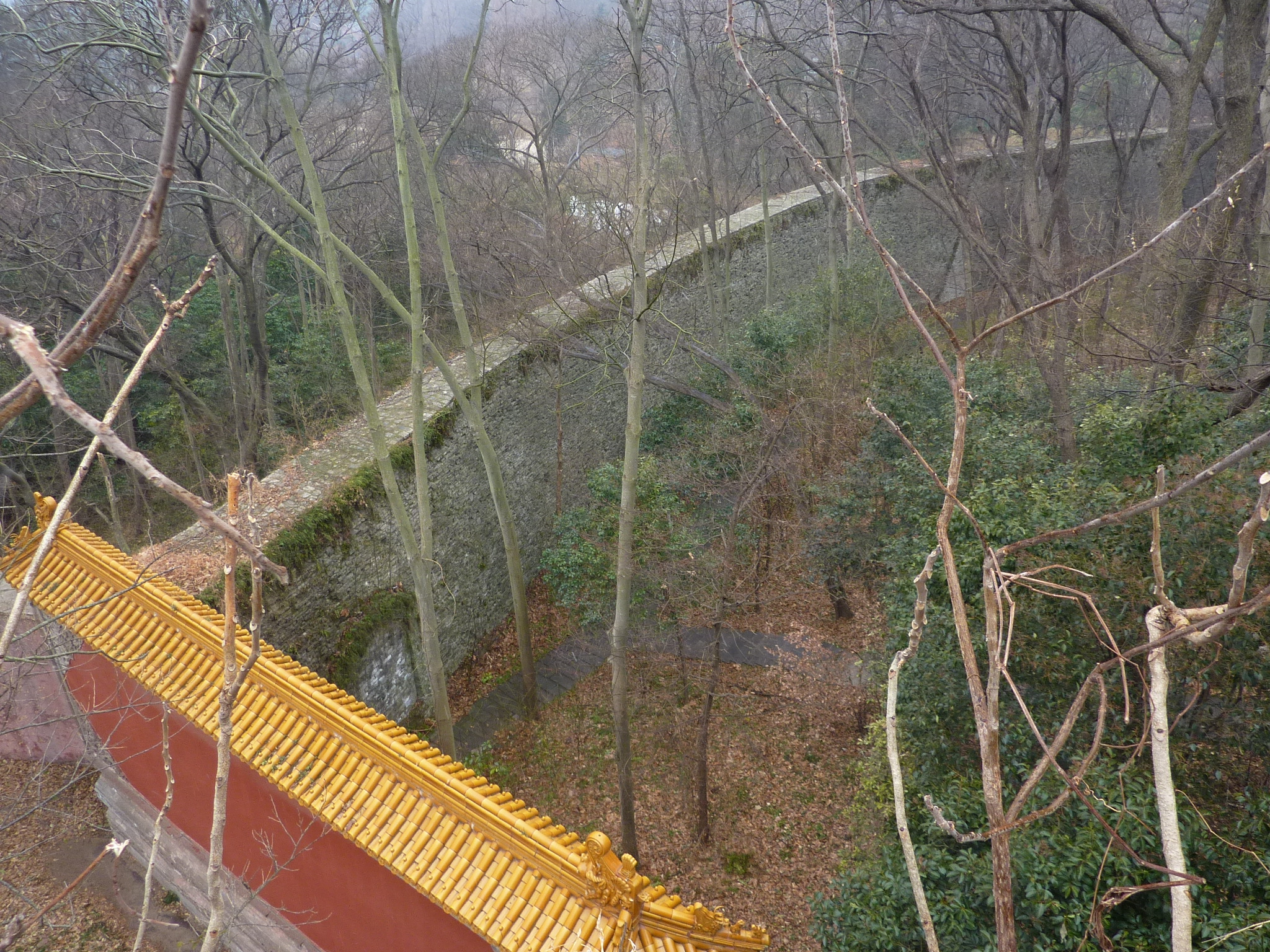
The wall surrounding the top of the Lone Dragon Hill, seen from the Soul Tower

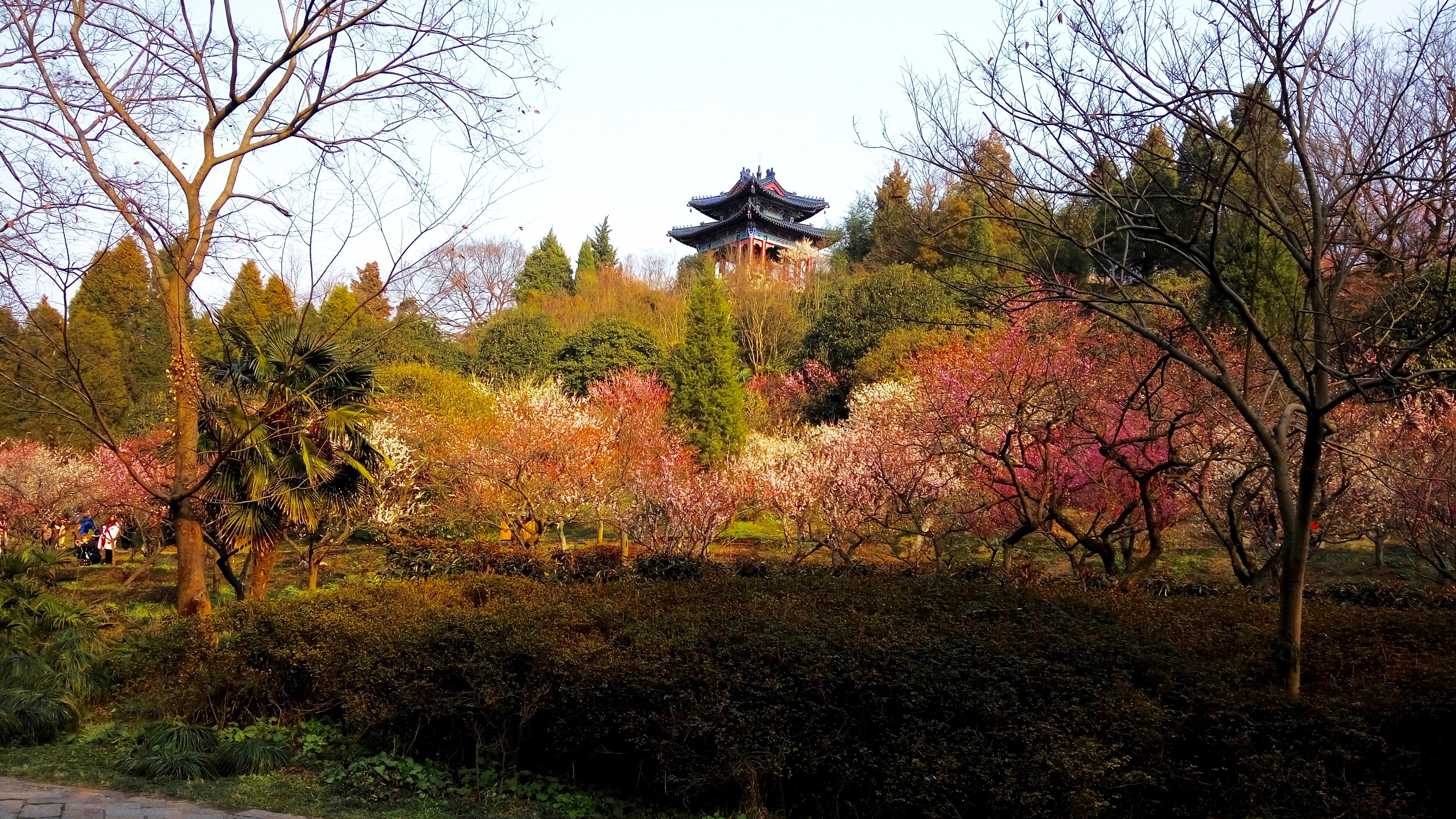
The annual plum blossom festival is located on Plum Blossom Hill

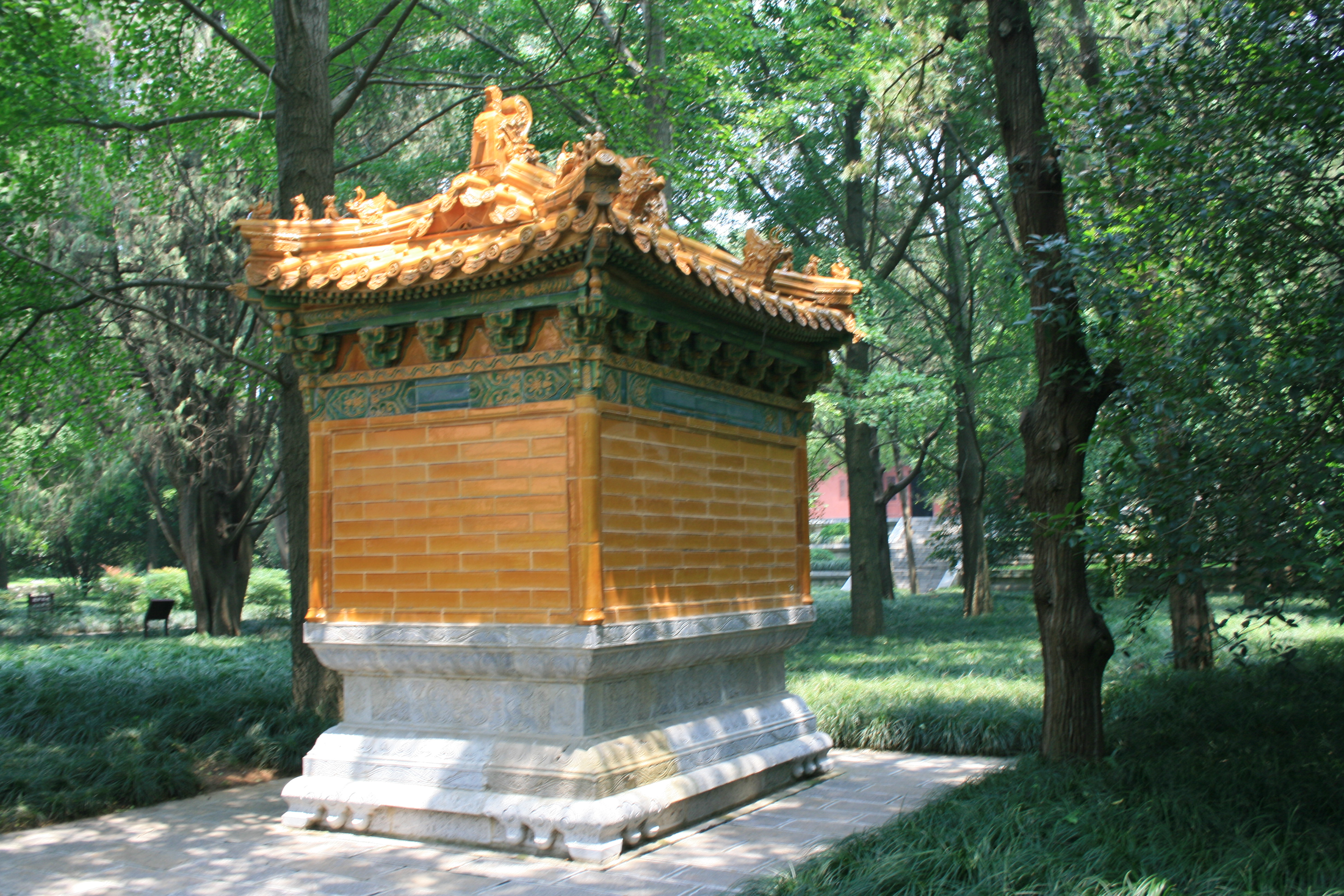
The Shenbo Stove ("The Silk Burner")

== Mystery of the third tortoise ==
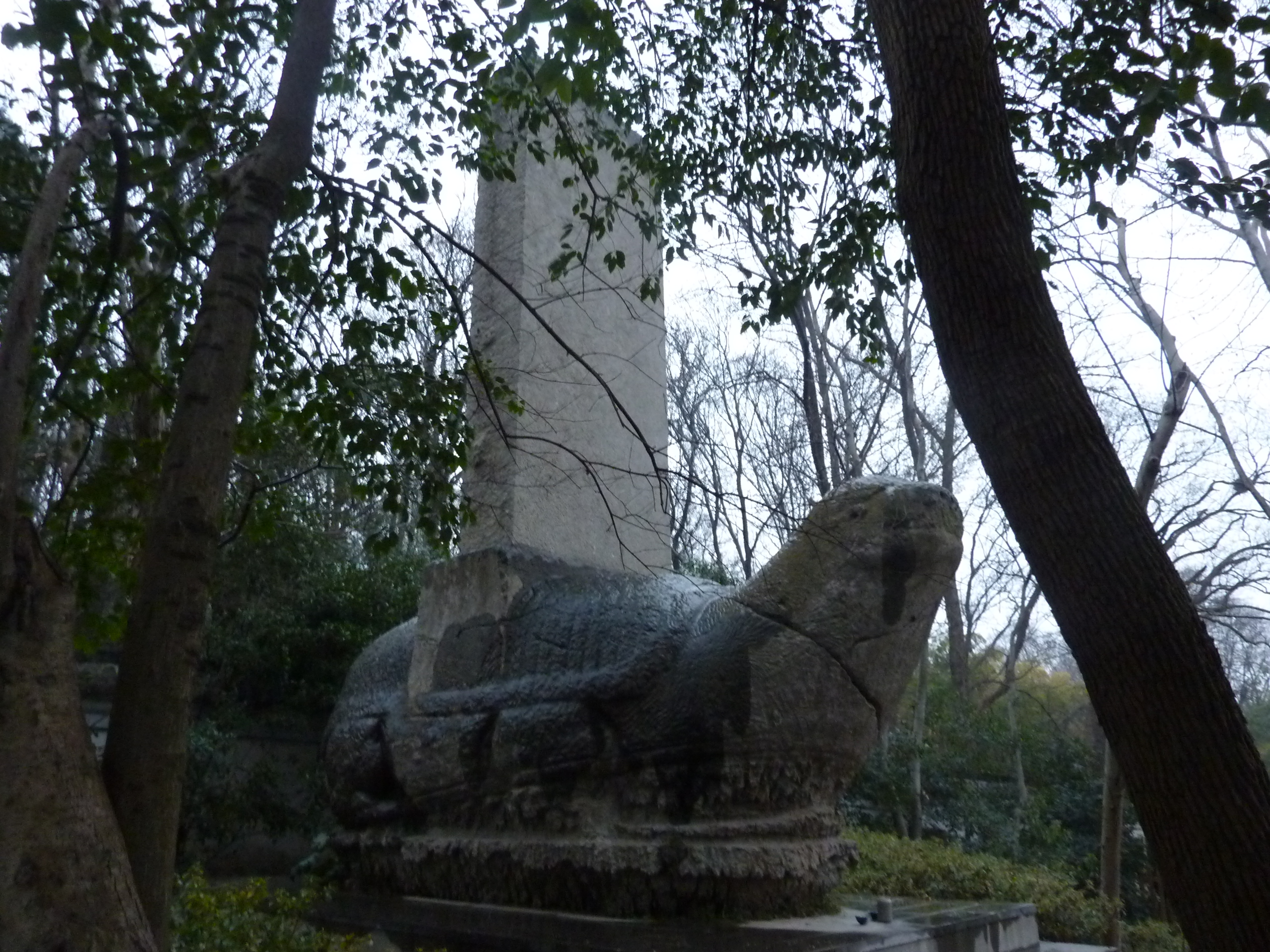
The unfinished bixi with a blank stele, re-installed in the Red Chamber Culture Park

In 1999, another, unfinished, stone tortoise and an unfinished stele lying on the ground were discovered in a ravine just over 100 m to the southeast from the Sifangcheng Pavilion, and even closer to Madame Chiang Kai-Shek's former villa (known as Meiling Gong). The tortoise, larger than those under the Shengde stele and the Kangxi Emperor's steles, and the matching blank stele were recognized by experts as being products of the early Ming, but the reasons for their manufacture and abandonment became subjects for speculation among historians. A number of possible explanations – from faulty material to the overthrow of the Jianwen Emperor by the Yongle Emperor in 1402 – have been advanced.

In the meantime, the tortoise and the blank stele (无字碑) have been moved to the Red Chamber Culture Park (红楼艺文苑, Honglou Yiwen Yuan), located just east of the Ming Xiaoling complex. The park (which otherwise is a modern Dream-of-the-Red-Chamber-themed landscape and sculpture park) can be visited on the same ticket with the Ming Xiaoling proper.

== Bibliography ==
- Xiaoling Tomb, Nanjing, China (Asian Historical Architecture – a Photographic Survey) – includes detailed site map and photos. One of their main sources is: Barry Till, with the assistance of Paula Swart. In Search of Old Nanking. Joint Pub. Co. (Hong Kong Branch). 1982. Hong Kong
- Yang, Xinhua (杨新华); Lu, Haiming (卢海鸣) (2001), 南京明清建筑 (Ming and Qing architecture of Nanjing), Nanjing University Press, ISBN 7-305-03669-2
