= Harry Murphy (disambiguation) =

Harry Murphy was a rugby league footballer.

Harry Murphy may also refer to:

- Harry Murphy (football manager) (born 1959), with the Wicklow county team
- Harry Murphy (sport shooter), participated in Shooting at the 2011 Island Games

== See also ==
- Henry Murphy (disambiguation)
- Harold Murphy (disambiguation)
