= Jiang Ziwen =

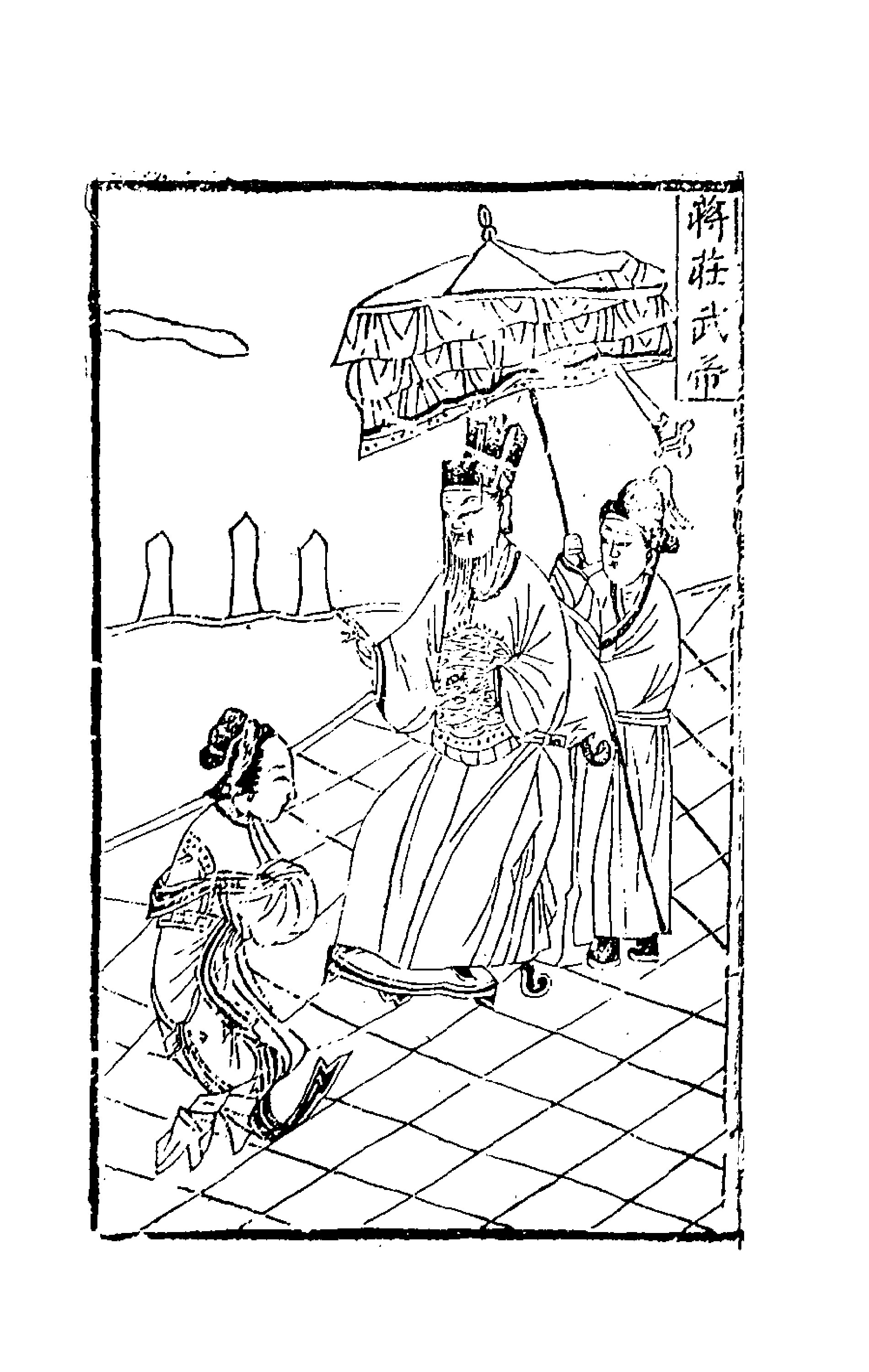
Jiang Ziwen

Jiang Ziwen (traditional Chinese: 蔣子文; simplified Chinese: 蒋子文; pinyin: Jiǎng Zǐwén) was a wei of Moling (modern Nanjing) county in China during the Eastern Han dynasty.

Originally from Guangling, now a district of Yangzhou in Jiangsu Province, he became addicted to wine and women, but was nonetheless recognized for his unusual phrenology. In the course of putting down an insurrection, he was killed by a blow to the forehead.

During the Three Kingdoms era, people repeatedly reported encountering his spirit, so that Sun Quan called him the God of Bell Mountain (鐘山山神; 钟山山神; Zhōngshān Shānshén), a peak near Nanjing which was then also known as Jiangshan (蔣山).

Following the introduction of Buddhism to China and the popularization of its king of the dead Yama, Jiang was placed in charge of the first of the ten courts in underworld as the Qinguang King (秦廣王蔣; 秦广王蒋; Qínguǎng Wáng Jiǎng).
