= Hank Murphy =

Hank Murphy may refer to:

- Hank "Halloween" Murphy, in the US animated film series and media franchise Cars
- Hank Murphy, in the US adult animated TV series Sealab 2021, voiced by Harry Goz
- Hank Murphy, in the 1994 US family sports fantasy comedy-drama film Angels in the Outfield, played by Ben Johnson

== See also ==
- Henry Murphy (disambiguation)
