= Harold Murphy =

Harold Murphy may refer to:

- Harold Lloyd Murphy (1927–2022), United States federal judge
- Harold Murphy (politician) (1938–2015), American politician

== See also ==
- Harry Murphy (disambiguation)
