= National Revolutionary Army Memorial Cemetery =

Cemetery in Nanjing, China

Coordinates: 32°03′02″N 118°51′40″E

Clockwise from top left: Linggu Temple, memory hall for the National Revolutionary Army; Wu Liang Dian; Linggu archway; Monument to the Chinese Fifth Army and Nineteenth Route Army Soldiers who fell fighting the Japanese invaders in Shanghai in 1932. Located near Linggu Temple

The National Revolutionary Army War Memorial Cemetery in Nanjing was used for burials between 1931 and 1935. It is located at Purple Mountain in the east of Nanjing, and lies west of the Sun Yat-sen Mausoleum, occupying about one square kilometer. After the founding of the People's Republic of China it was renamed "Hope Valley Park."
