= Meiling Palace =

Villa in Nanjing, China

Meiling Palace National Government Chairman Residence
- 美齡宮 国民政府主席官邸
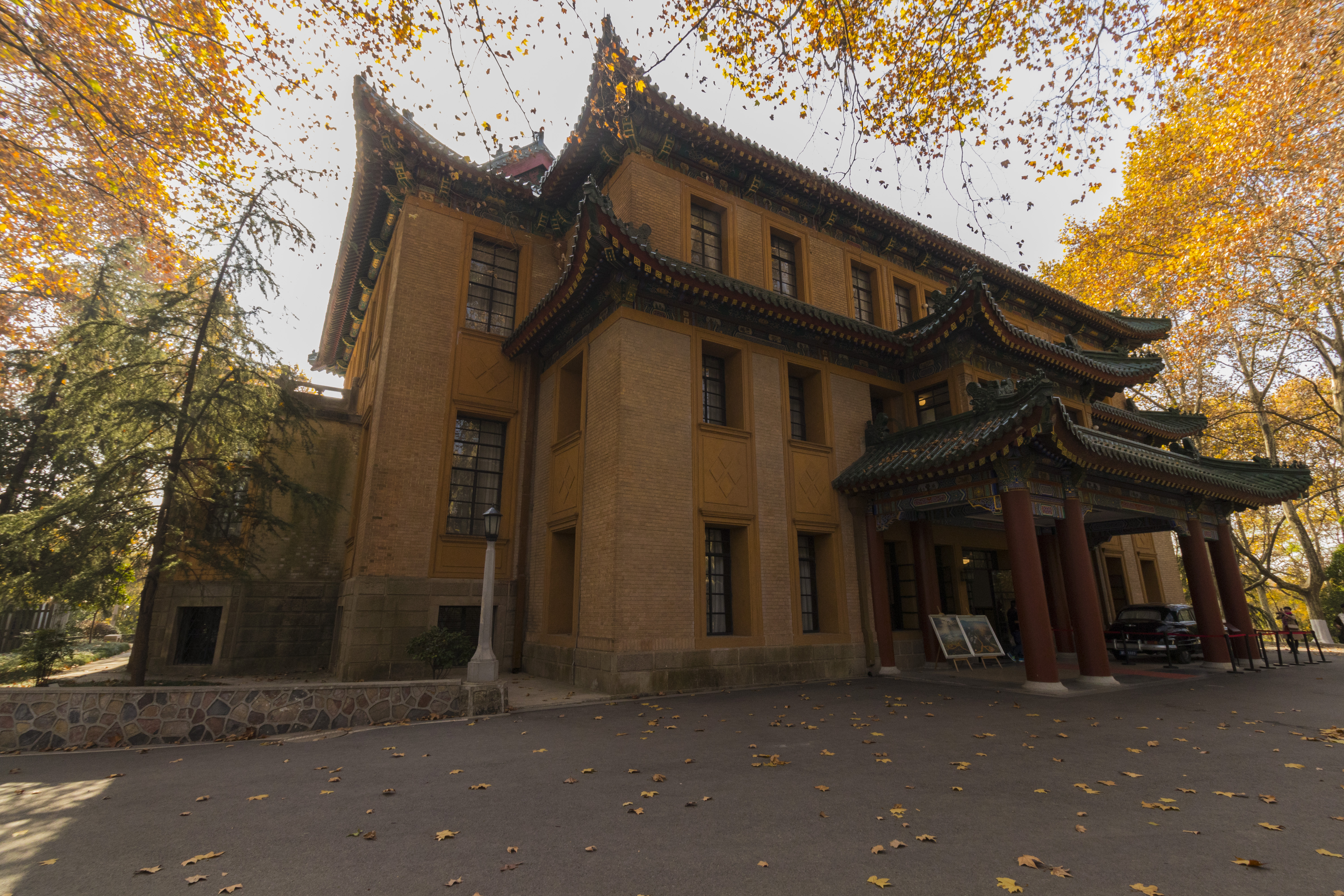
- View of the villa
- Interactive map of the Meiling Palace; National Government Chairman Residence area

General information
- Architectural style: Chinese
- Location: No. 9 Zhongshanling, Nanjing, Jiangsu, China
- Coordinates: 32.045479°N 118.846507°E
- Completed: 1934

Technical details
- Material: Brick
- Floor count: 2 + basement and mezzanine
- Floor area: c.2000 m^{2}

Other information
- Public transit access: Metro Line 2 to Xiamafang Station, exit 2; bus 34 to Bo'aiyuan

Meiling Palace
- Traditional Chinese: 美齡宮
- Simplified Chinese: 美龄宮
Transcriptions
Standard Mandarin
- Hanyu Pinyin: Měilínggōng
- Bopomofo: ㄇㄟˇ ㄌㄧㄥˊ ㄍㄨㄥ
- Wade–Giles: Mei^{3}-ling^{2}-kung^{1}
- IPA: [mèɪ.lǐŋ.kʊ́ŋ]
Yue: Cantonese
- Yale Romanization: Méihlìhnggūng
- Jyutping: mei5 ling4 gung1
- IPA: [mej˩˧.lɪŋ˩.kʊŋ˥]

National Government Chairman Residence
- Traditional Chinese: 國民政府主席官邸
- Simplified Chinese: 国民政府主席官邸
Transcriptions
Standard Mandarin
- Hanyu Pinyin: Guómín Zhèngfǔ Zhǔxí Guāndǐ
- Bopomofo: ㄍㄨㄛˊ ㄇㄧㄣˊ ㄓㄥˋ ㄈㄨˇ ㄓㄨˇ ㄒㄧˊ ㄍㄨㄢ ㄉㄧˇ
- Wade–Giles: Kuo^{2}-min^{2} Cheng^{4}-fu^{3} Chu^{3}-hsi^{2} Kuan^{1}-ti^{3}
- IPA: [kwǒ.mǐn ʈʂə̂ŋ.fù ʈʂù.ɕǐ kwán.tì]
Yue: Cantonese
- Yale Romanization: Gwokmàhn Jingfú Jyújihk Gūndái
- Jyutping: gwok3 man4 zing3 fu2 zyu2 zik6 gun1 dai2
- IPA: [kʷɔk̚˧.mɐn˩ tsɪŋ˧.fu˧˥ tsy˧˥.tsɪk̚˨ kun˥.tɐj˧˥]

Meiling Palace (Chinese: 美齡宮, aka Meiling Villa and Meiling Gong) is a large villa in Nanjing, China, built by the chairman of the Chinese National Government, Chiang Kai-Shek, for his wife, Soong Meiling. It is known formally as the National Government Chairman Residence (Chinese: 国民政府主席官邸).

The villa is located below Purple Mountain, about 6 km from Nanjing's city centre in the Zhongshan Mountain Scenic Area. It is the largest villa in Nanjing, with a floor area of more than 2,000 m^{2}.

Meiling Palace was completed in 1934, as a residence for the chairman of the Chinese National Government. Chiang Kai-Shek gave the mansion to his wife on her birthday, 4 March, and the couple moved there in summer 1936. Later it was used as a base for officials visiting the Sun Yat-sen Mausoleum, located nearby. After the end of the war between China and Japan in 1946, the National Government moved back to Nanjing and Chiang Kai-Shek used this villa as his official residence.

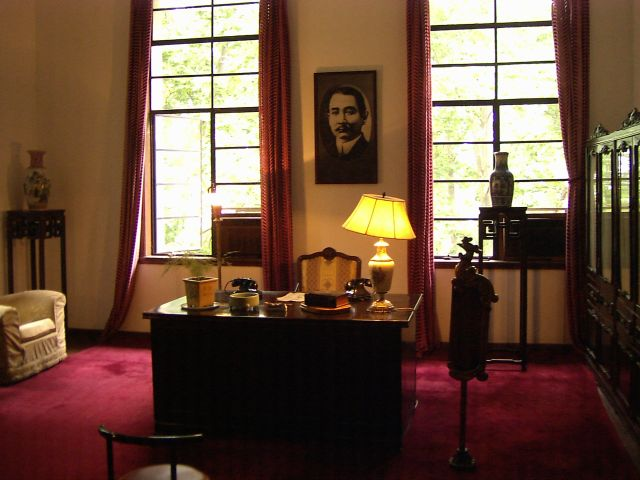
Room inside the villa

The exterior of the villa was built in a traditional Chinese style with double eaves and a roof of green glazed tiles. There are more than a thousand phoenixes carved on the roof tiles. The Chinese artist Chen Zhifo (1896–1962) painted the eaves with birds and flowers. Viewed from above, the trees surrounding the villa are in the form of a necklace. The interior was in a western style.

The building has two main storeys, a basement, and a mezzanine between the first and second floors. In the basement, there is an exhibition of paintings by Soong Meiling. On the second floor, there is a private chapel.
