= Purple Mountain (Nanjing) =

Mountain in Nanjing, Jiangsu, China

- Zijin Mountain
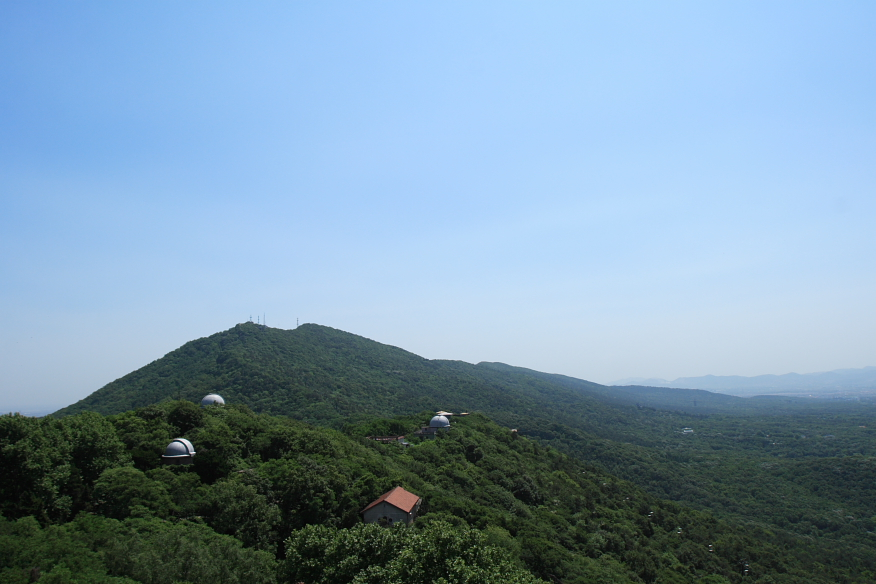
- View from the Purple Mountain Observatory

Highest point
- Elevation: 448.2 m (1,470 ft)
- Coordinates: 32°04′13″N 118°50′42″E

Geography
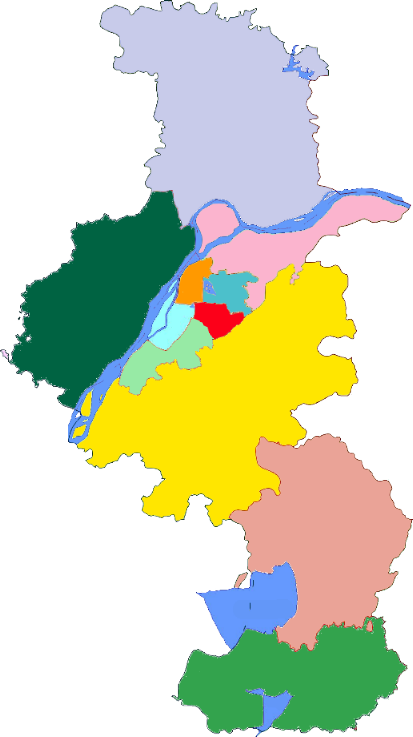
- Location within Nanjing
- Location: Xuanwu District, Nanjing, Jiangsu

Purple Mountain or Zijin Shan (Chinese: 紫金山; pinyin: Zǐjīn Shān; lit. 'Purple-Gold Mountain') is located on the eastern side of Nanjing in Jiangsu province, China. It is 448.9 metres (1,473 ft) high, with it being the highest in Nanjing when compared to other mountains in the city. Its peaks are often found enveloped in purple and golden clouds at dawn and dusk, hence its name.

A small mountain with an area of about 20 square kilometres (7.7 sq mi), the altitude of Purple Mountain at the top and foot of the mountain is about 448 metres (1,470 ft) and 20 metres (66 ft) respectively. The annual average rainfall is 979 millimetres (38.5 in) to 1,050 millimetres (41 in), and the average annual sunshine time is about 1,855–2,059 hours. Purple Mountain is a mountain related to many historical events of both ancient and modern China. It was originally known as Bell Mountain (traditional Chinese: 鐘山; simplified Chinese: 钟山; pinyin: Zhōngshān) and also became known as Mount Jiang (traditional Chinese: 蔣山; simplified Chinese: 蒋山; pinyin: Jiǎngshān) after Sun Quan named Jiang Ziwen, an Eastern Han official whose spirit was said to haunt the site, as the mountain's god during the Three Kingdoms era. The name Zijin (紫金) means "copper" - when copper is pure, it appears purple in color, so in Chinese, it is also called purple-gold. It is also named Mount Jinling (金陵山), due to its purple rocks. Jinling means "the mount of purple-gold". It is the origin of the nickname "Jinling" (金陵) of Nanjing. During the Ming dynasty, it was also called Mount Shenlie (神烈山).

More than 200 heritage and scenic tourist sites are now located in or around the mountain, including three national historical sites, nine provincial historical sites, and 33 prefectural historical sites. Located in or close to the hillside of the mountain, there are also about a dozen national research institutes and universities. The Xiao Mausoleum, burial place of the Hongwu Emperor and his family, is at the southern foot of the mountain. The Sun Yat-sen Mausoleum, the tomb of Sun Yat-sen, and the Meiling Palace, the residence of Soong Meiling, are located at the foot of the mountain. Within the grounds of the nearby Linggu Temple are the tombs of Tan Yankai and Deng Yanda.

Purple Mountain has 621 species of vascular plants, from 383 genera, 118 families (including 78 cultivated species).

== See also ==
- Aviation Martyrs' Cemetery
- Linggu Temple
- Meiling Palace
- Ming Xiaoling Mausoleum
- Purple Mountain Observatory
- Sun Yat-sen Mausoleum
