= Xiquan =

Xiquan may refer to:

- Xiquan, Anhui, town in Fengyang County, Anhui, China
- Xiquan, Gansu, town in Jingtai County, Gansu, China
- Xiquan Subdistrict, Xi'an, Shaanxi, China
- Xigou, also known as Xiquan, sighthound breed native to China
- Dilang, also known as Xiquan, underground dogs in Chinese legend
