= Imperial Tombs of the Ming and Qing Dynasties =

UNESCO World Heritage Site
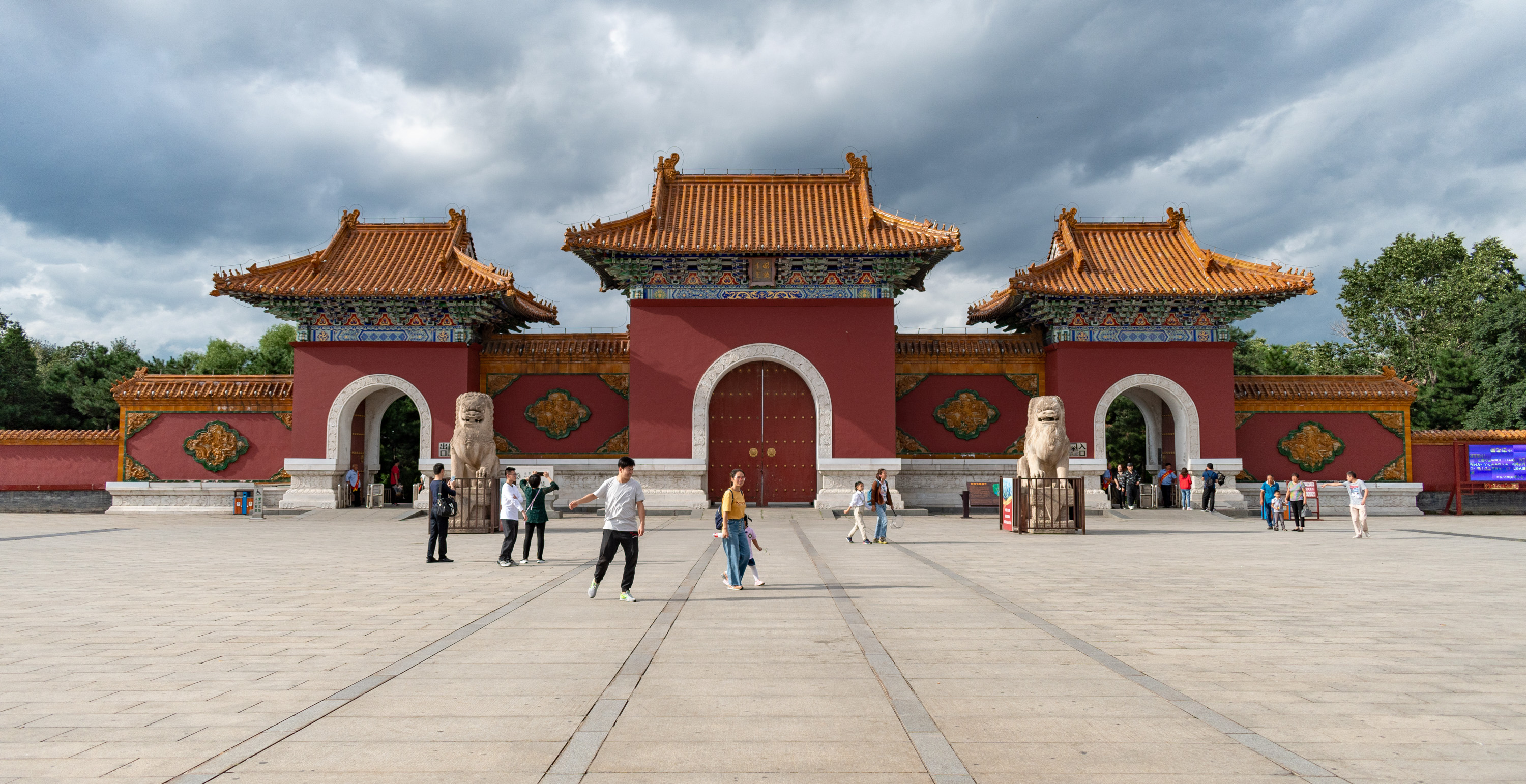
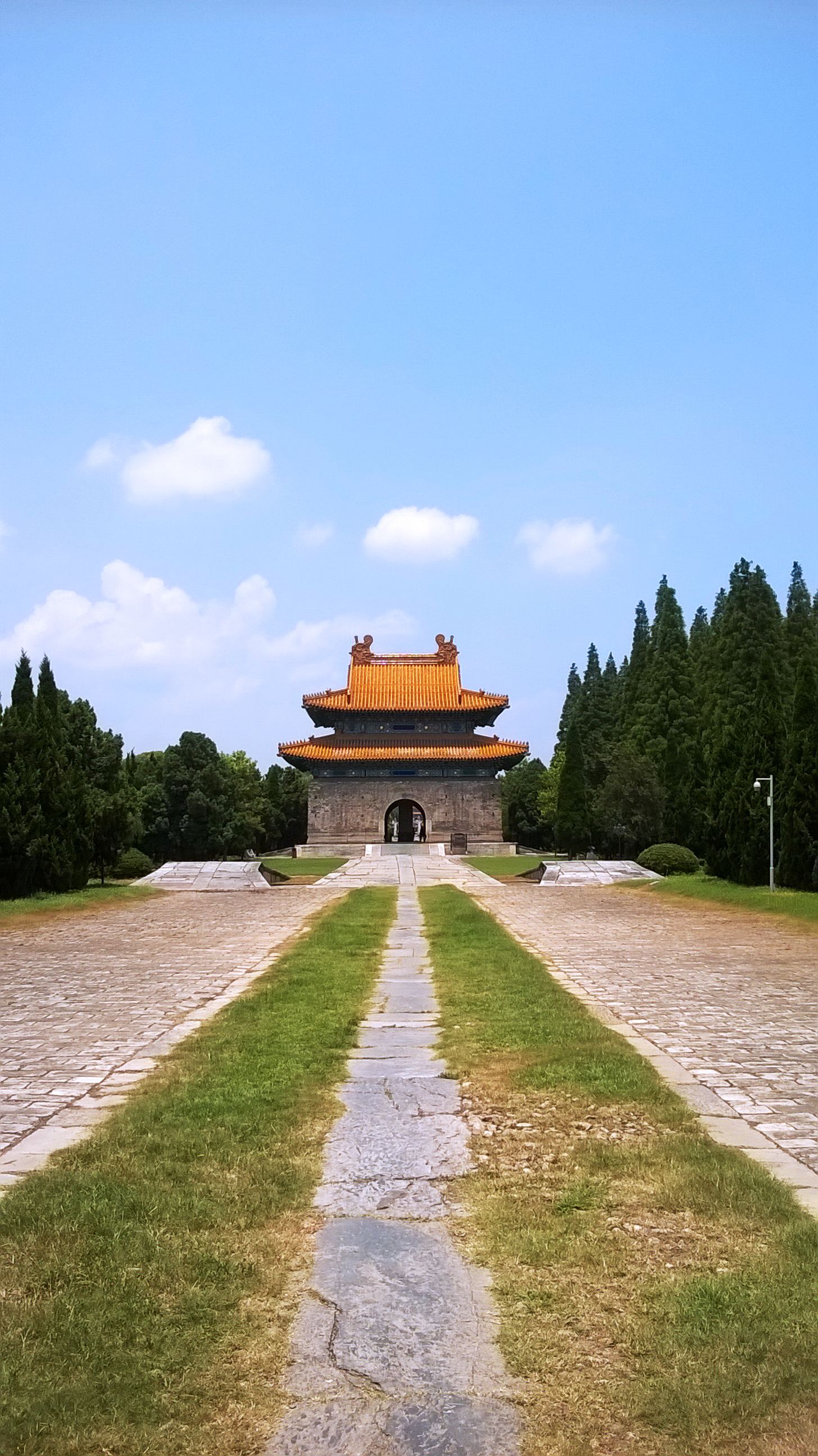
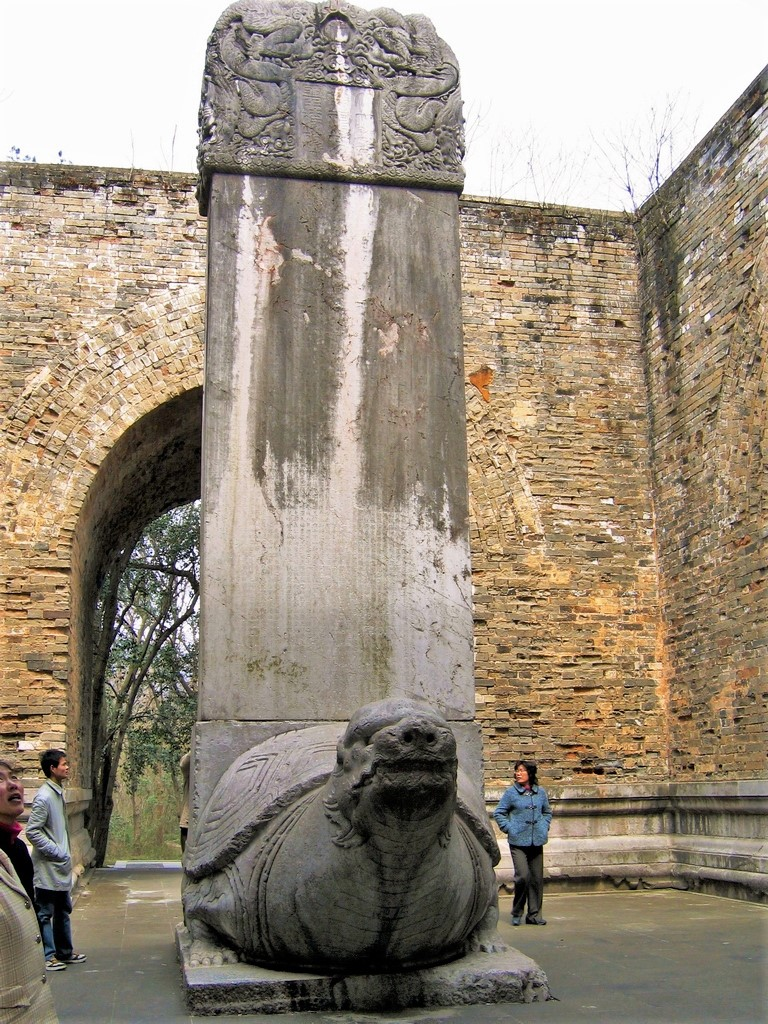
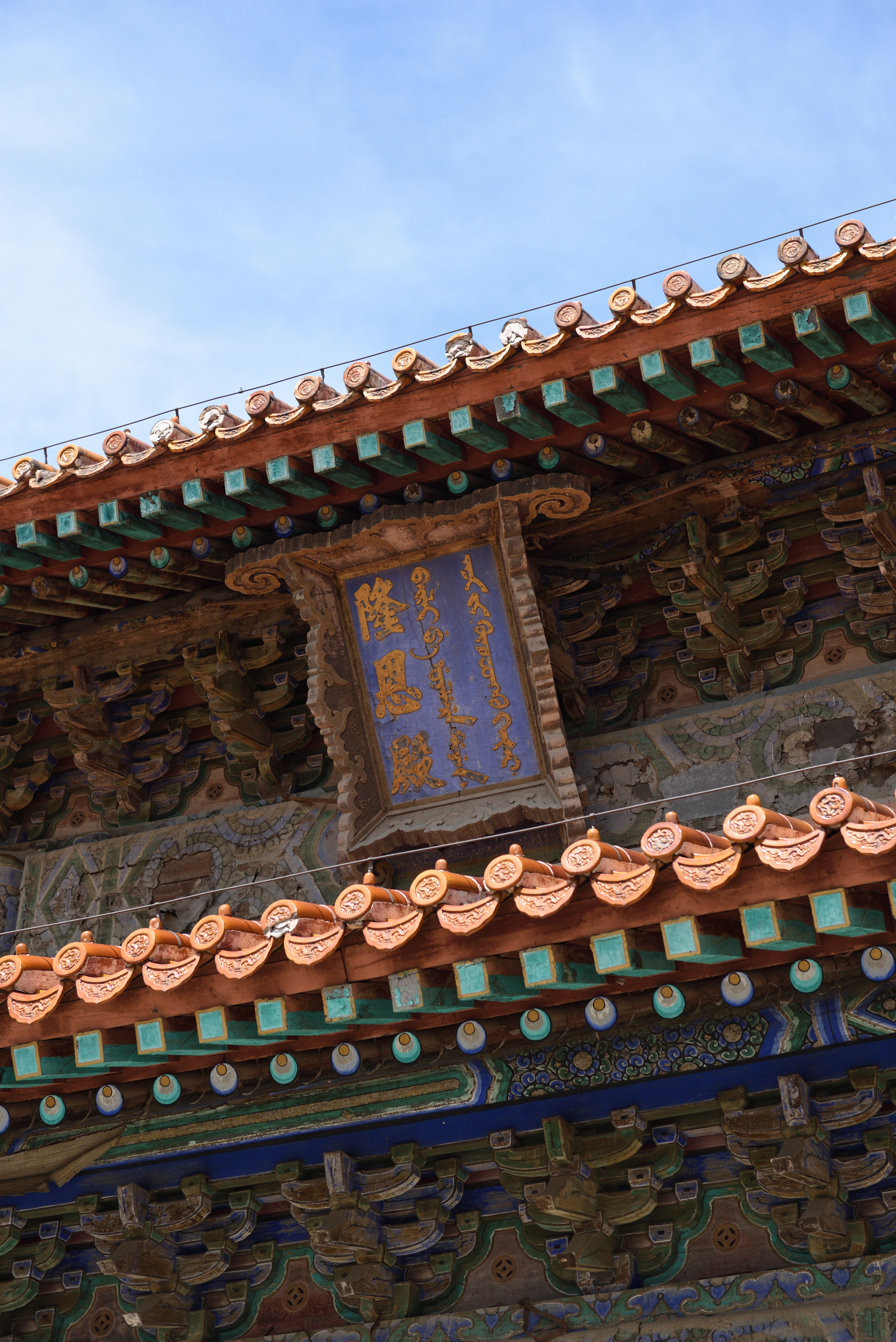
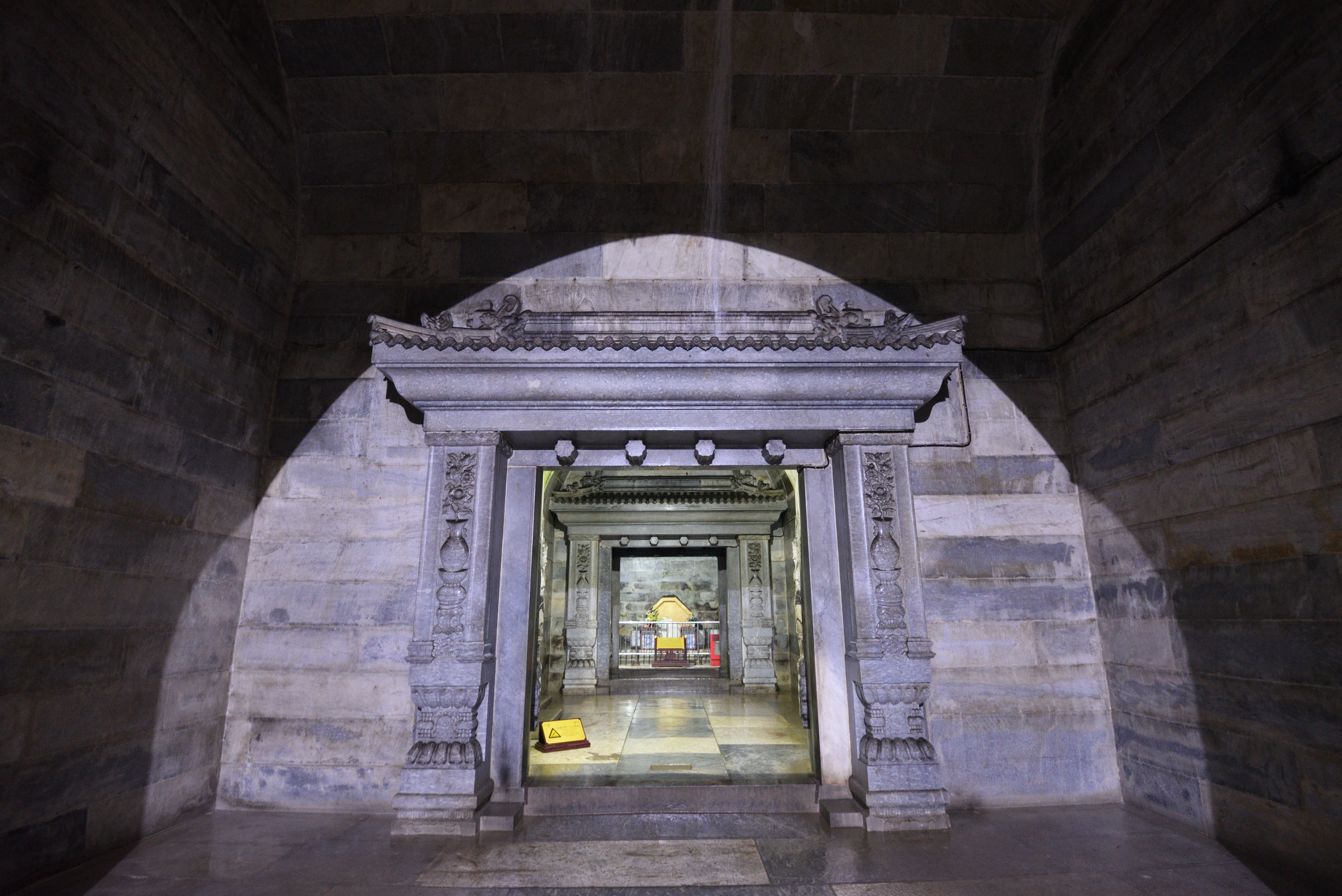
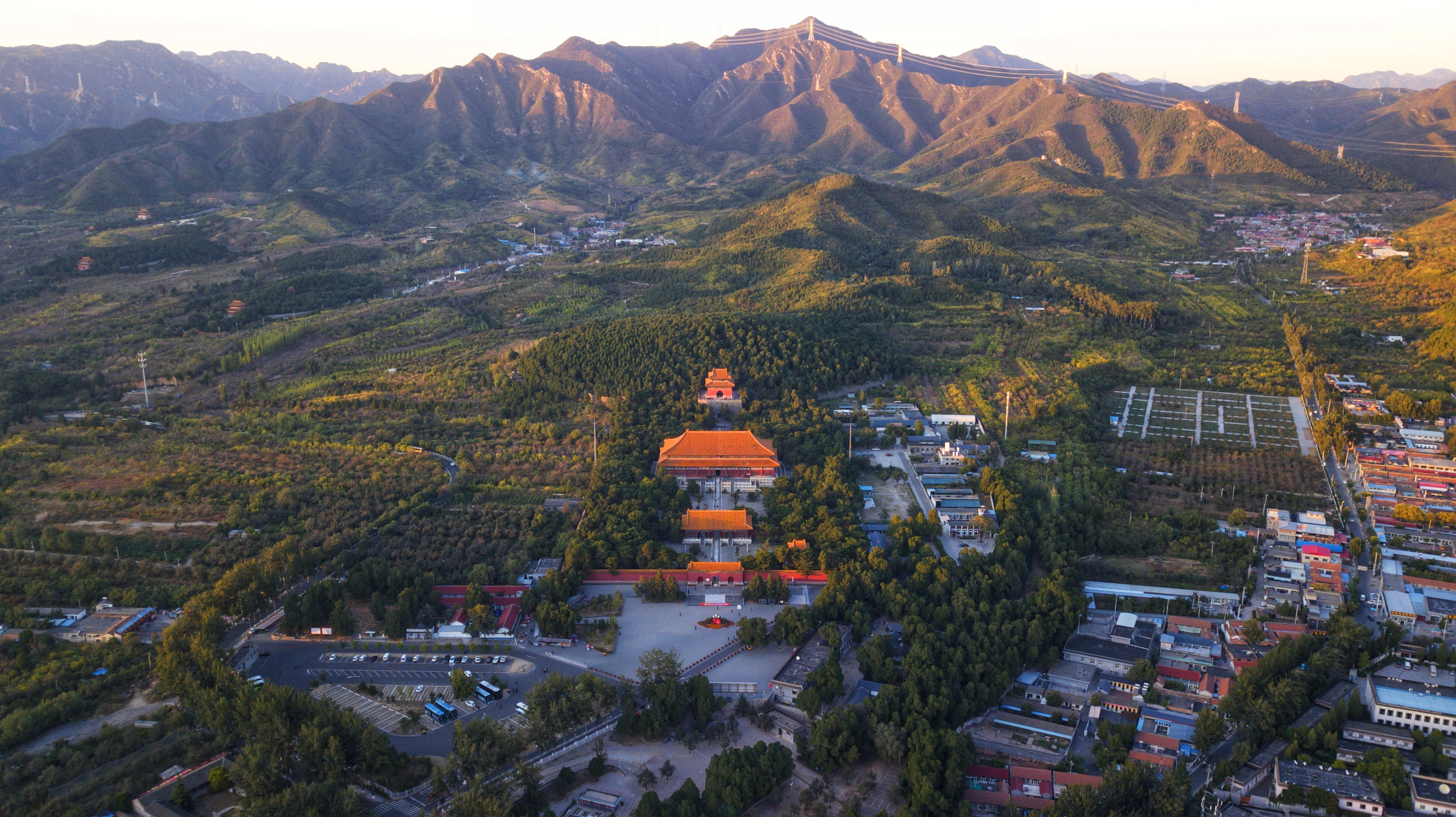
- Zhaoling in Liaoning Xianling in Hubei Xiaoling in Jiangsu Jingling in Hebei Chongling in Hebei Changling in Beijing
- Interactive map of Imperial Tombs of the Ming and Qing Dynasties
- Location: People's Republic of China
- Criteria: Cultural: (i)(ii)(iii)(iv)(vi)
- Reference: 1004ter
- Inscription: 2000 (24th Session)
- Extensions: 2003, 2004
- Area: 3,434.9 ha (13.262 sq mi)

Imperial Tombs of the Ming and Qing Dynasties (simplified Chinese: 明清皇家陵寝; traditional Chinese: 明清皇家陵寢; pinyin: Míng Qīng Huángjiā Língqǐn) is the designation under which the UNESCO has included several tombs and burial complexes in the list of World Heritage Sites. These tombs date from the Ming and Qing dynasties of China.

Tombs were included in the list in 2000, 2003 and 2004. Three Imperial tombs in Liaoning Province, all built in the 17th century, were added in 2004: the Yongling tomb, the Fuling tomb and the Zhaoling tomb were constructed for the founding emperors of the Qing dynasty and their ancestors. These tombs feature rich decoration of stone statues and carvings and tiles with dragon motifs, illustrating the development of the funerary architecture of the Qing dynasty. The three tomb complexes, and their numerous edifices, combine traditions inherited from previous dynasties and new features of Manchu culture.

== Ming Tombs ==
Hongwu Emperor, the founding emperor of the Ming dynasty, made major reforms to the mausoleum. He changed the mounds on the ground from the previous bucket-shaped square to round or oblong, canceled the palace, and enlarged the temple building. The Qing dynasty followed the Ming dynasty system, paying more attention to the combination of the cemetery and the surrounding mountains and rivers, paying attention to the order of the buried people, and forming the matching sequence of the emperor and concubine tombs, and the sacrificial system was more perfect and reasonable. There are 13 tombs in the Ming tombs site near Beijing, but other Ming dynasty tombs are also part of the World Heritage Sites. For example, the Xianling Tomb, located in Hubei Province, was constructed for the 12th emperor of the Ming dynasty from 1519 to 1566.

== Qing Tombs ==
In traditional China, the veneration of the dead is very important. After the first emperor of the Qing dynasty conquered the Ming dynasty, he choose to build Qing tombs with the Ming tombs, to assure his new subjects that the traditions of the Han Chinese would still be respected. In addition, the first emperor of the Qing dynasty believed the concept of 'Mandate of Heaven', this is also one of the reasons that he choose to build around the Ming Tombs.

As a feudal ruler, he treated it as an important work related to the prosperity and decline of the country and the length of the emperor's fortune. This concept was pushed to its peak. In the site selection and planning and design of the tomb, the traditional Chinese Feng Shui theory was fully used, and the cosmology of "the harmony between man and nature" was embodied, and the human spirit was cast in nature, creating a lofty, great and eternal Immortal imagery. In terms of the scale and quality of the building, it strives to be magnificent, spectacular and exquisite, in order to embody the idea of the supremacy of imperial power, show off the imperial style and majesty, and become the symbol of the materialization of imperial power.

The Three Tombs of ShengJing (Chinese: 盛京三陵; pinyin: Shèng Jīng Sān Líng) are the ancestors' tombs that created the foundation of the Manchu and Qing imperial family. The shape of the tombs of the three tombs is imitated as illuminated mausoleums with strong stylized features, which influenced the construction of the tombs of the Qing dynasty after entering the Pass. The three tombs of Shengjing plus the Eastern Tombs of the Qing dynasty and the Western Tombs of the Qing dynasty, constitute a group of Qing imperial tombs, condensing the history of the Qing dynasty.

== Properties included in the World Heritage Site ==
WHS No. 1004ter includes the following individual tombs and tomb groups:

Serial ID No.	Tomb or group	Province	Location	Coordinates	Area (m²)	Buffer (m²)	Year inscribed
1004-001	Xianling Tomb	Hubei	Zhongxiang	31°01′N 112°39′E	876,000	2,264,000	2000
1004-002	Eastern Qing Tombs	Hebei	Zunhua	41°11′N 117°38′E	2,240,000	78,000,000	2000
1004-003	Western Qing Tombs	Hebei	Yi County	39°20′N 115°13′E	18,420,000	47,580,000	2000
1004-004	Ming Tombs	Beijing	Changping District	40°16′10″N 116°14′40″E	8,230,000	81,000,000	2003
1004-005	Xiaoling Tomb	Jiangsu	Nanjing	32°03′37″N 118°50′04″E	1,160,000	1,800,000	2003
1004-006	Tomb of Chang Yuchun	Jiangsu	Nanjing	32°03′44″N 118°49′54″E	9,800		2003
1004-007	Tomb of Qiu Cheng	Jiangsu	Nanjing	32°03′51″N 118°49′59″E	5,500		2003
1004-008	Tomb of Wu Liang	Jiangsu	Nanjing	32°04′00″N 118°49′51″E	4,000	1,800,000	2003
1004-009	Tomb of Wu Zhen	Jiangsu	Nanjing	32°04′05″N 118°49′57″E	3,500		2003
1004-010	Tomb of Xu Da	Jiangsu	Nanjing	32°04′30″N 118°50′06″E	8,500		2003
1004-011	Tomb of Li Wenzhong	Jiangsu	Nanjing	32°04′47″N 118°50′23″E	8,700		2003
1004-012	Yongling Tomb of the Qing dynasty	Liaoning	Fushun	41°42′36.4″N 124°48′08.8″E	2,365,900	13,439,400	2004
1004-013	Fuling Tomb of the Qing dynasty	Liaoning	Shenyang	41°49′48.0″N 123°35′26.0″E	538,600	7,023,600	2004
1004-014	Zhaoling Tomb of the Qing dynasty	Liaoning	Shenyang	41°51′09.1″N 123°25′39.0″E	478,900	3,187,400	2004
Total					34,379,400	234,294,400	

== Other Imperial tombs ==
The UNESCO World Heritage Site does not include the mausoleum complexes which the Hongwu Emperor built for his ancestors:

- Ming Huangling, the tomb of his parents Zhu Wusi and Lady Chen in Fengyang, Anhui
- Ming Zuling, the tomb of his grandfather, great-grandfather, and great-great-grandfather in Xuyi, Jiangsu

== See also ==
- Chinese burial & fengshui
- Mausoleum of the Yellow Emperor, a supposed tomb in Huangling, Shaanxi
- Mausoleum of the First Emperor, the tomb of Shi Huangdi in Xi'an, Shaanxi
- Han Changling, the tomb of the first Han emperor in Weicheng, Shaanxi
- Persia's Naqsh-e Rustam, Peru's Sacred Valley, Mongolia's Tomb of Genghis Khan, Egypt's Valley of the Kings, and Tibet's Valley of the Kings
