= Earth-wolf =

Earth-wolf may refer to:

- Aardwolf (literally "earth-wolf"), a hyena species native to Africa
- Dilang (literally "earth-wolf"), underground dogs in Chinese legend
