= Yin Jian =

Yin Jian or Yinjian may refer to:

- Yin Jian (Communist leader) (1904–1937), Chinese Communist leader
- Yin Jian (windsurfer) (born 1978), Chinese windsurfer
- Seal (East Asia) (印鑑; yìnjiàn)
- Yinjian (陰間; yīnjiān; 'Underworld'), another word for Diyu
- Yinjian, Anhui, town in Fengyang County, Anhui, China
