= Fuling Mausoleum =

Heritage site in Liaoning Province, China

Coordinates: 41°49′56″N 123°35′1″E

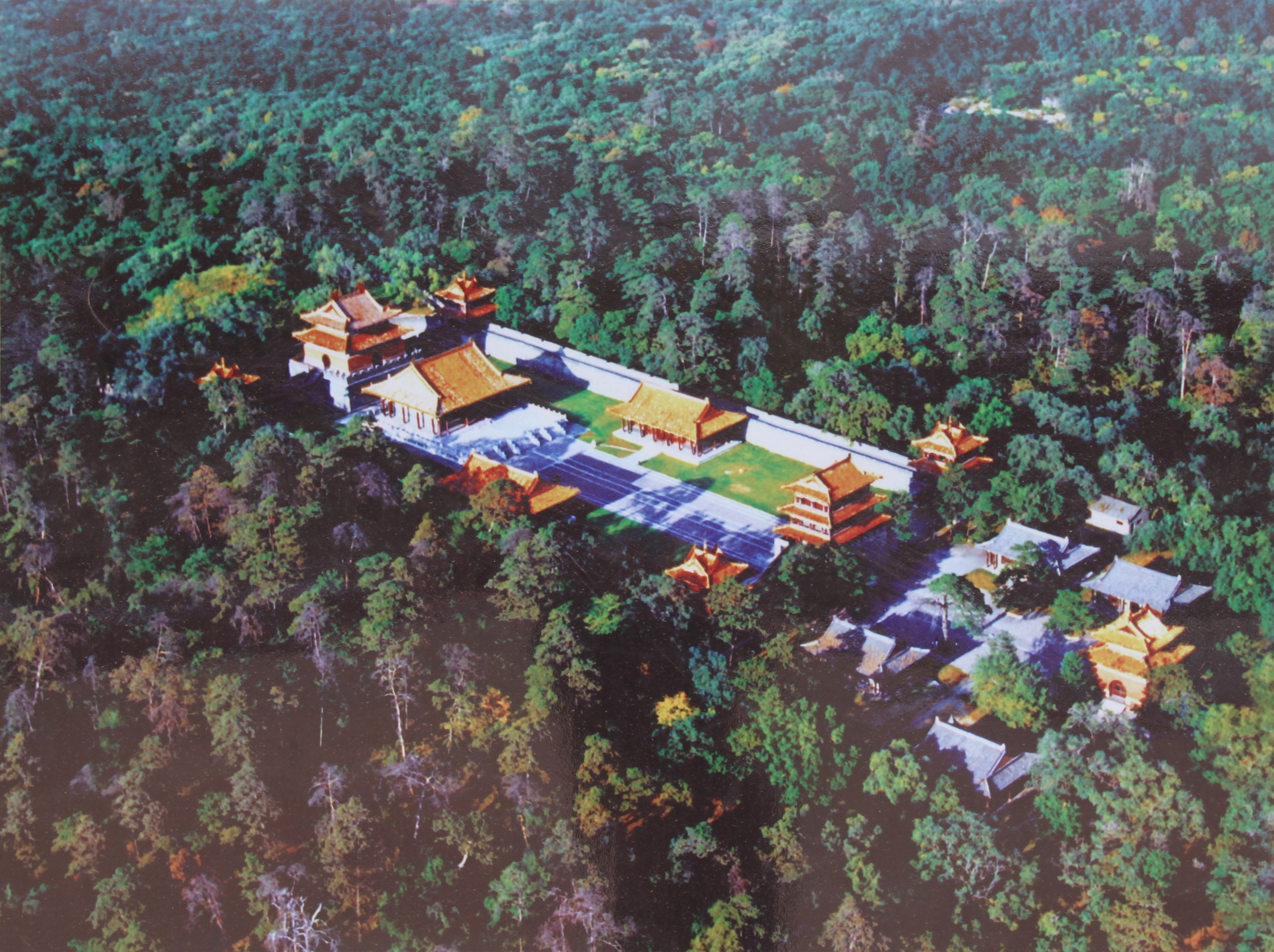
Fuling Tomb

The Fuling or Fu Mausoleum (Chinese: 福陵; pinyin: Fúlíng; lit. 'Mausoleum of Propitiousness'; Manchu: ᡥᡡᡨᡠᡵᡳᠩᡤᠠ
ᠮᡠᠩᡤᠠᠨ, romanized: hūturingga munggan), also known as the East Mausoleum (simplified Chinese: 东陵; traditional Chinese: 東陵; pinyin: Dōnglíng), is the mausoleum of Nurhaci, the founding monarch of the Later Jin dynasty (subsequently posthumously recognized as an emperor of the Qing dynasty) and his wife, Empress Xiaocigao. It served as the main site for ritual ceremonies conducted by the imperial family during the entire Qing dynasty. Located in the eastern part of Shenyang city, Liaoning Province, northeastern China, Fuling has been a UNESCO World Heritage Site since 2004.

== Layout ==
The mausoleum is an extensive architectural complex that consist of stone archway, main red gate, sacred way, cloud pillars, stone animals, a 108-step stone staircase, the Shengong Shengde Stele Pavilion, the washing room, the fruit room, the tea room, the waiting room, Long'en Gate, Long'en Hall, eastern and western side-halls, silk burning pavilion, Lingxing Gate, the five stone sacrifice utensils, Ming pavilion, and Treasure City.

== Location ==
The mausoleum is located in a hilly area 10 kilometers east of the old city of Shenyang.

== Protection ==
Fuling was inscribed as a UNESCO World Heritage Site in an extension to the site Imperial Tombs of the Ming and Qing Dynasties in 2004.
