= Tomb of Chang Yuchun =

- 常遇春墓
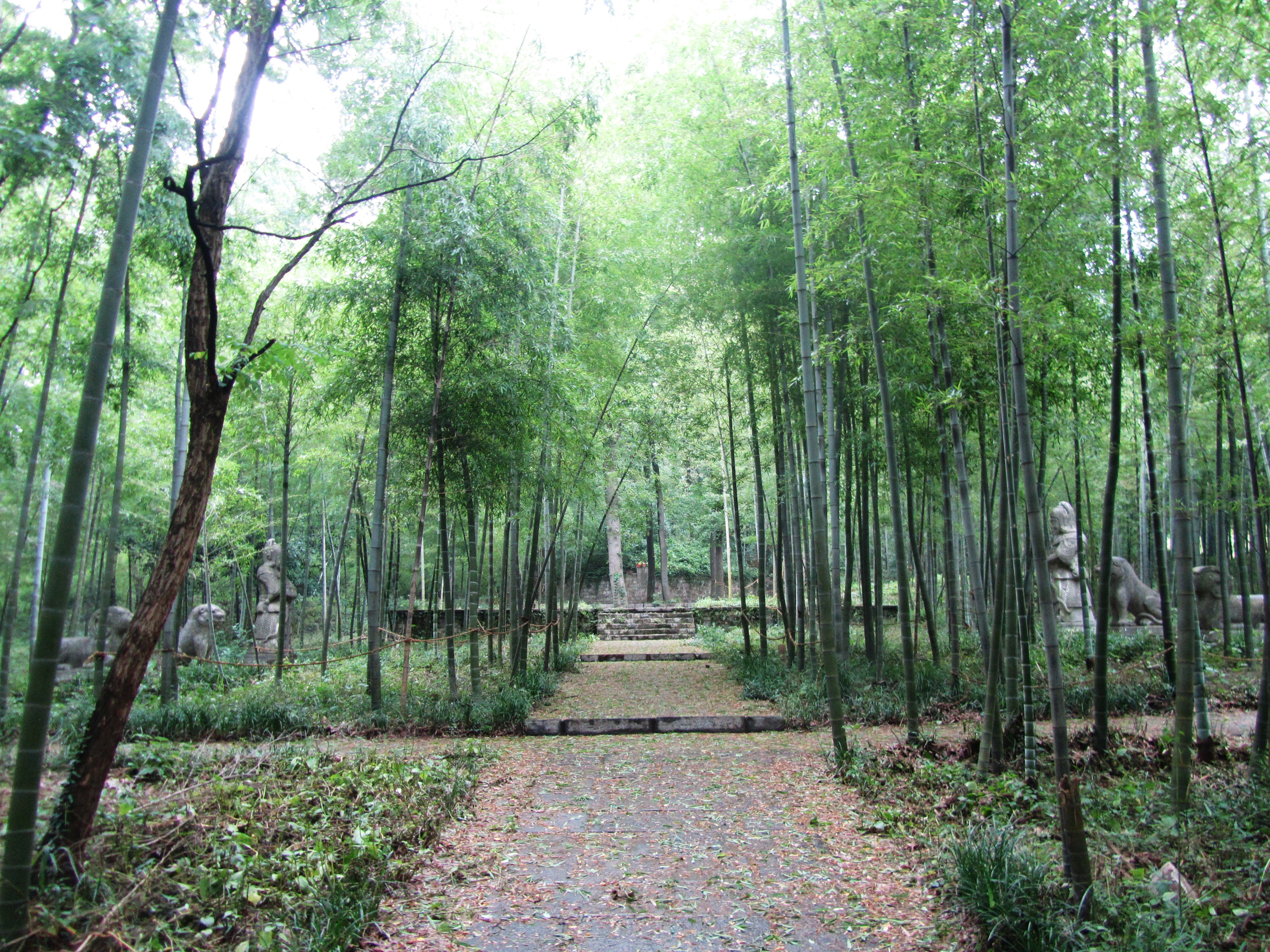
- Tomb of Chang Yuchun.

- Location within Jiangsu

General information
- Location: Purple Mountain, Xuanwu District, Nanjing, Jiangsu, China
- Coordinates: 32°03′43.99″N 118°49′54.01″E
- Completed: 1369
- Renovated: 1871

Technical details
- Material: Granite
- Grounds: 2,500 m^{2} (27,000 sq ft)

The Tomb of Chang Yuchun (Chinese: 常遇春墓; pinyin: Cháng Yùchūn Mù) is the tomb of Chang Yuchun (1330–1369), a military general in late Yuan and early Ming dynasties. The tomb dates from 1369, and is located on Purple Mountain in Nanjing. There are stone horses, stone tigers, stone sheep and stone warriors in front of the tomb. It has been categorized as a "Major National Historical and Cultural Site in Jiangsu" by the State Council of China. In addition, the tomb was inscribed on the UNESCO World Heritage List in 2003 as an extension of the Imperial Tombs of the Ming and Qing Dynasties site, for its outstanding preservation and its contribution to the medieval history of China.

== History ==
The tomb was built for Chang Yuchun, a military general in late Yuan and early Ming dynasties (1330–1369). The tomb is located on Purple Mountain, in Xuanwu District, Nanjing, Jiangsu.

In 1871, in the 11th year of Tongzhi period of Qing dynasty (1644–1911), Chang's descendants renovated and refurbished his tomb.

In May 2006, it was listed among the batch of "Major National Historical and Cultural Sites in Jiangsu" by the State Council of China.

== Gallery ==
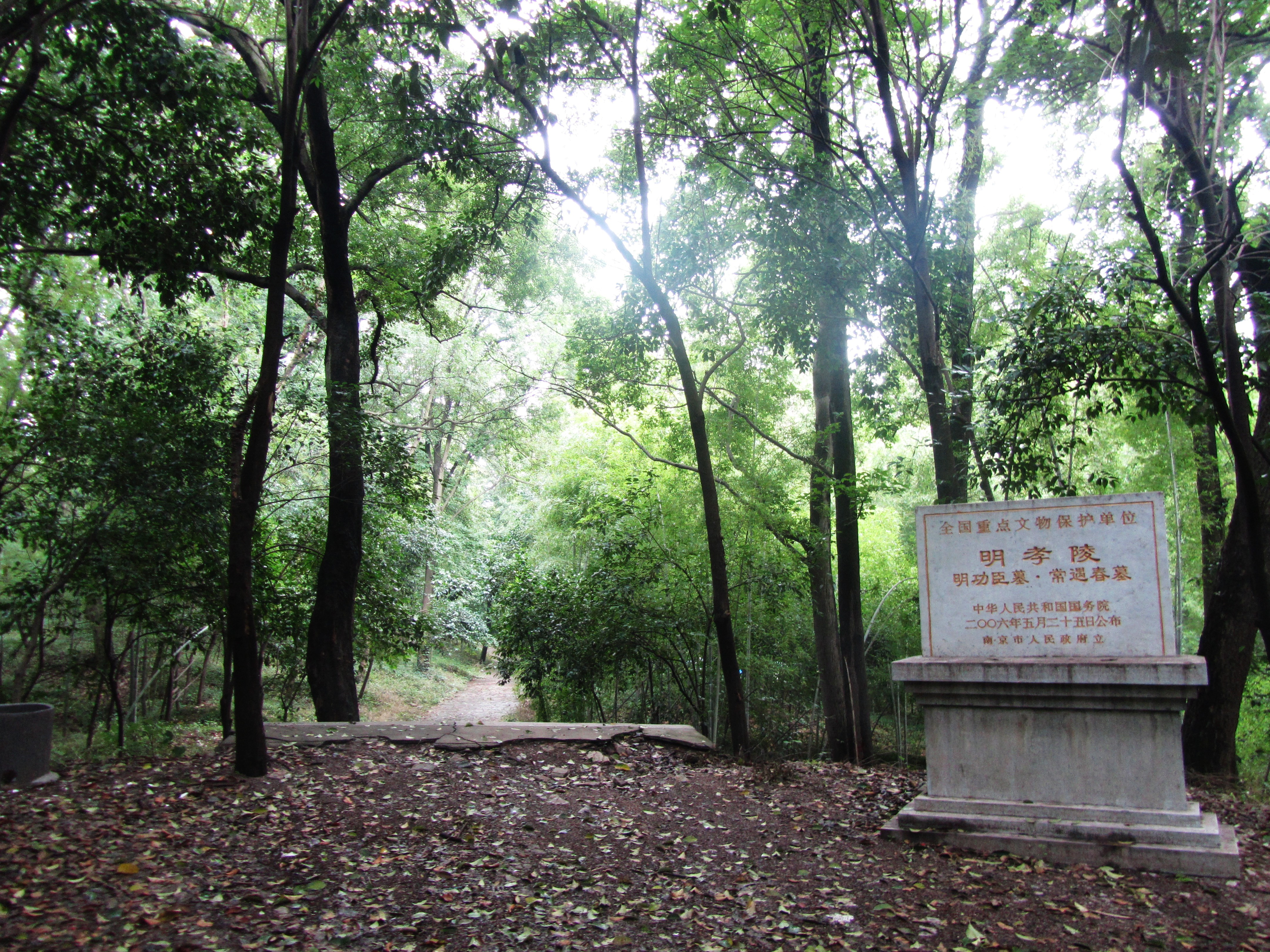
Stele.

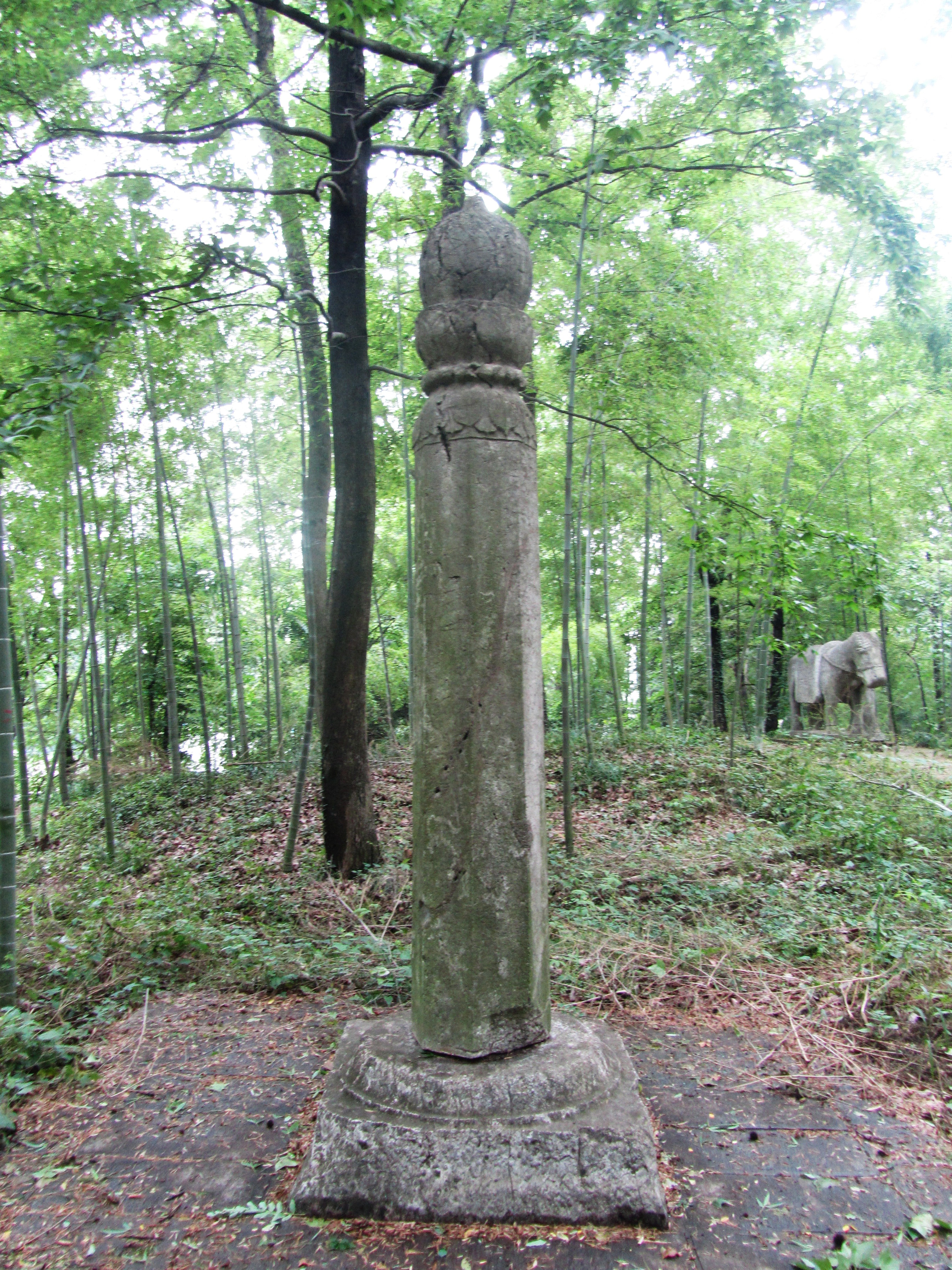
Stone pillar.

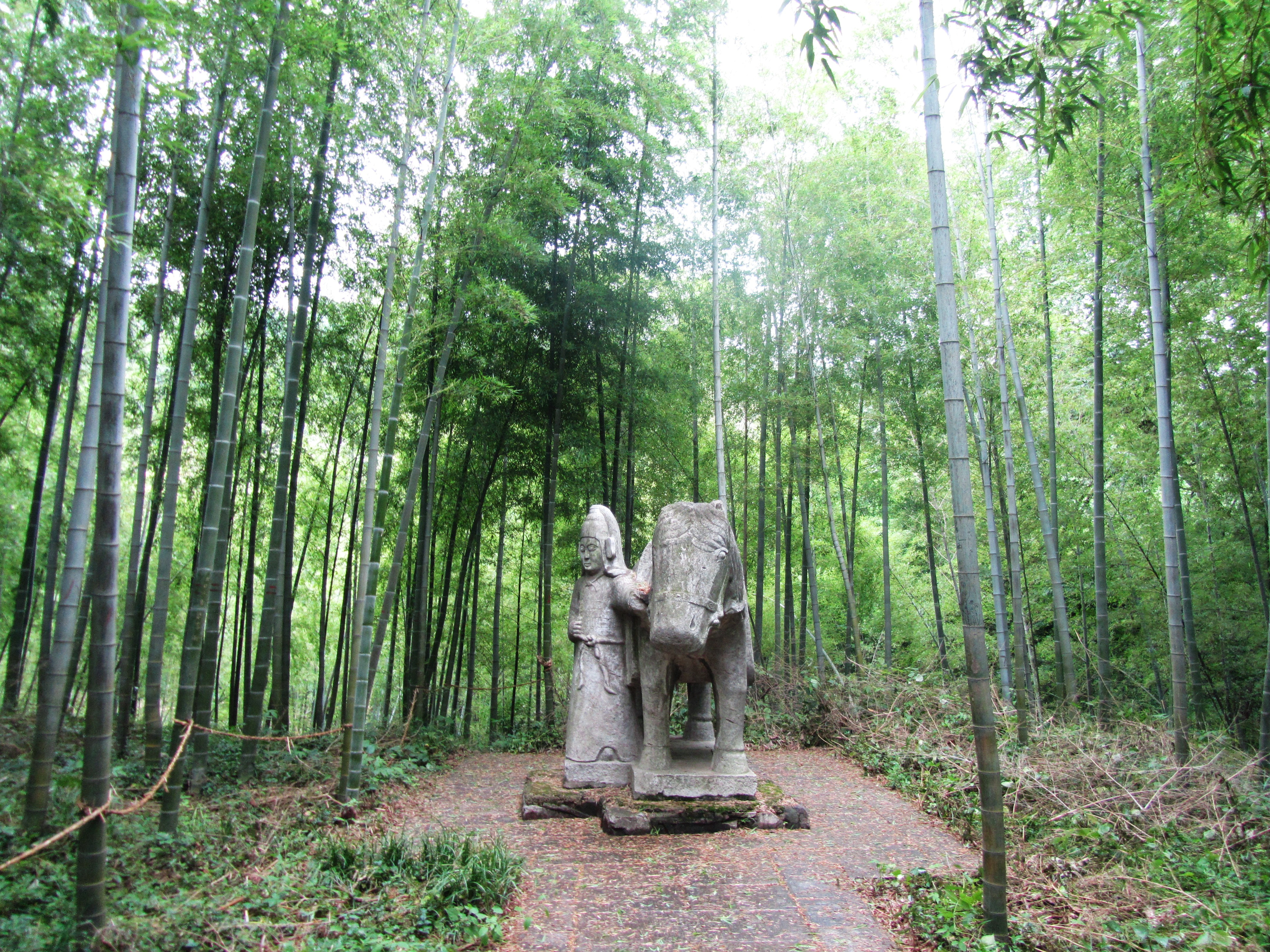
Stone horse.

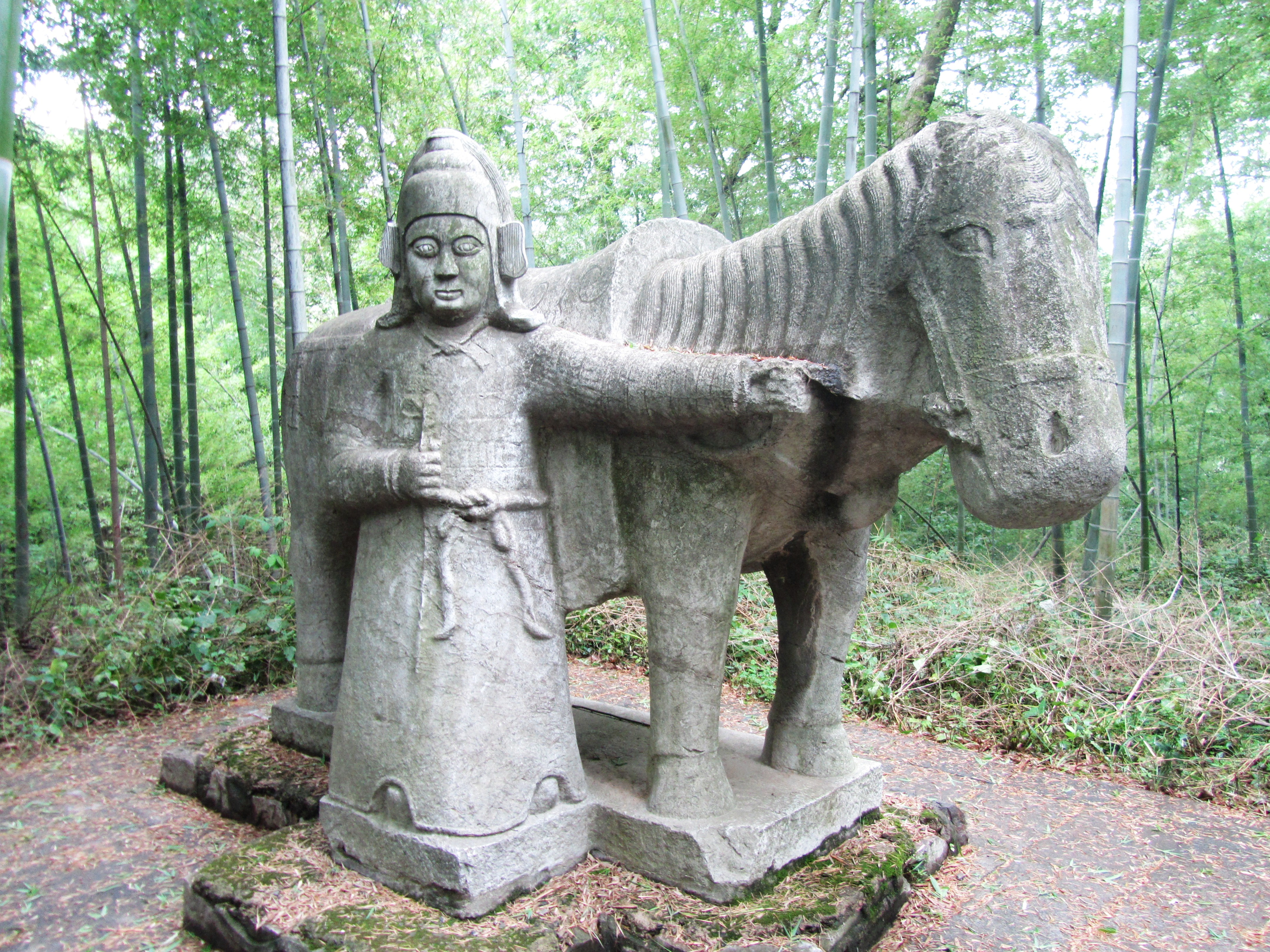
Stone horse.

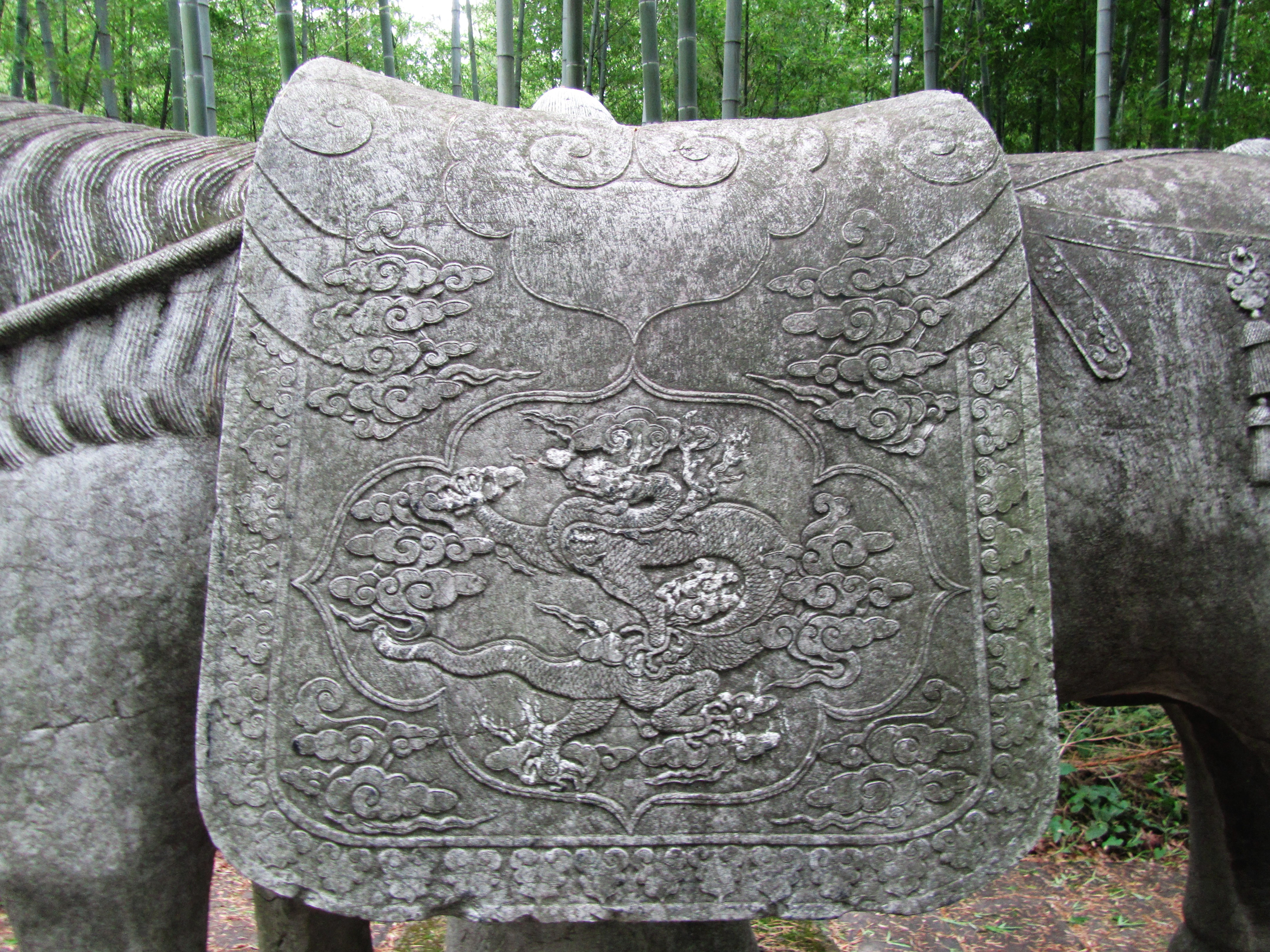
Stone saddle.

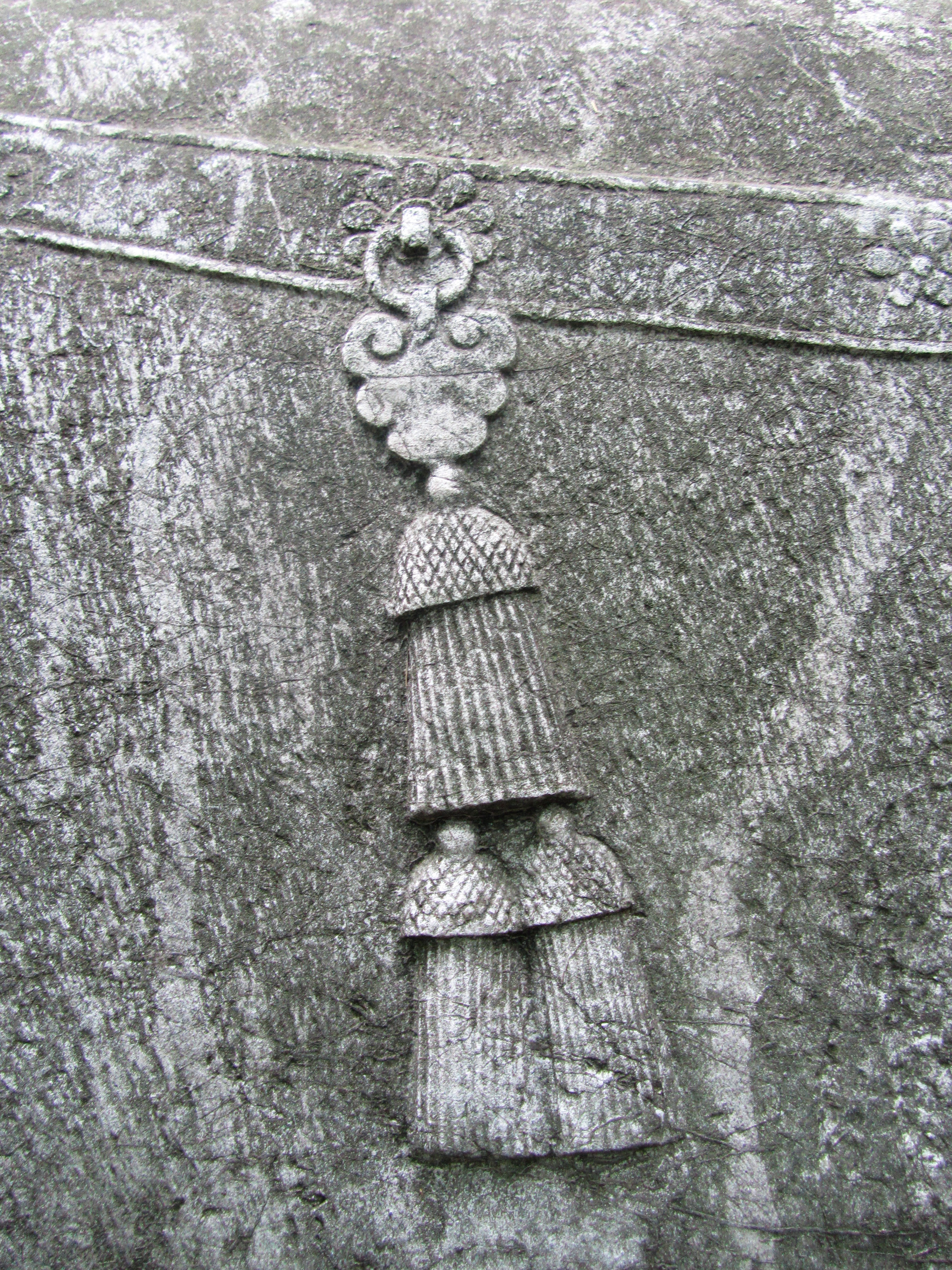
Stone horse.

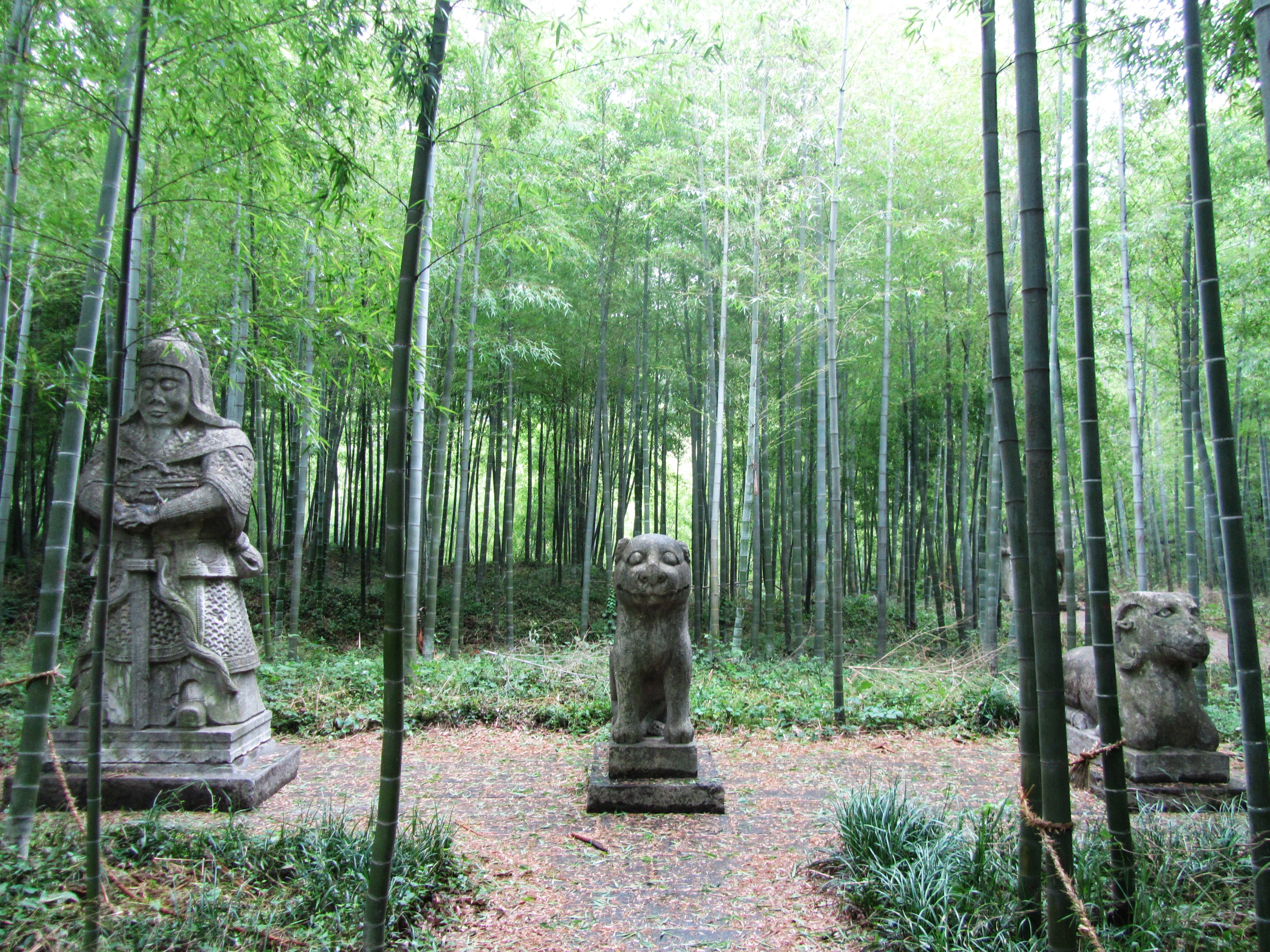
Stone tiger, stone sheep and stone warrior.

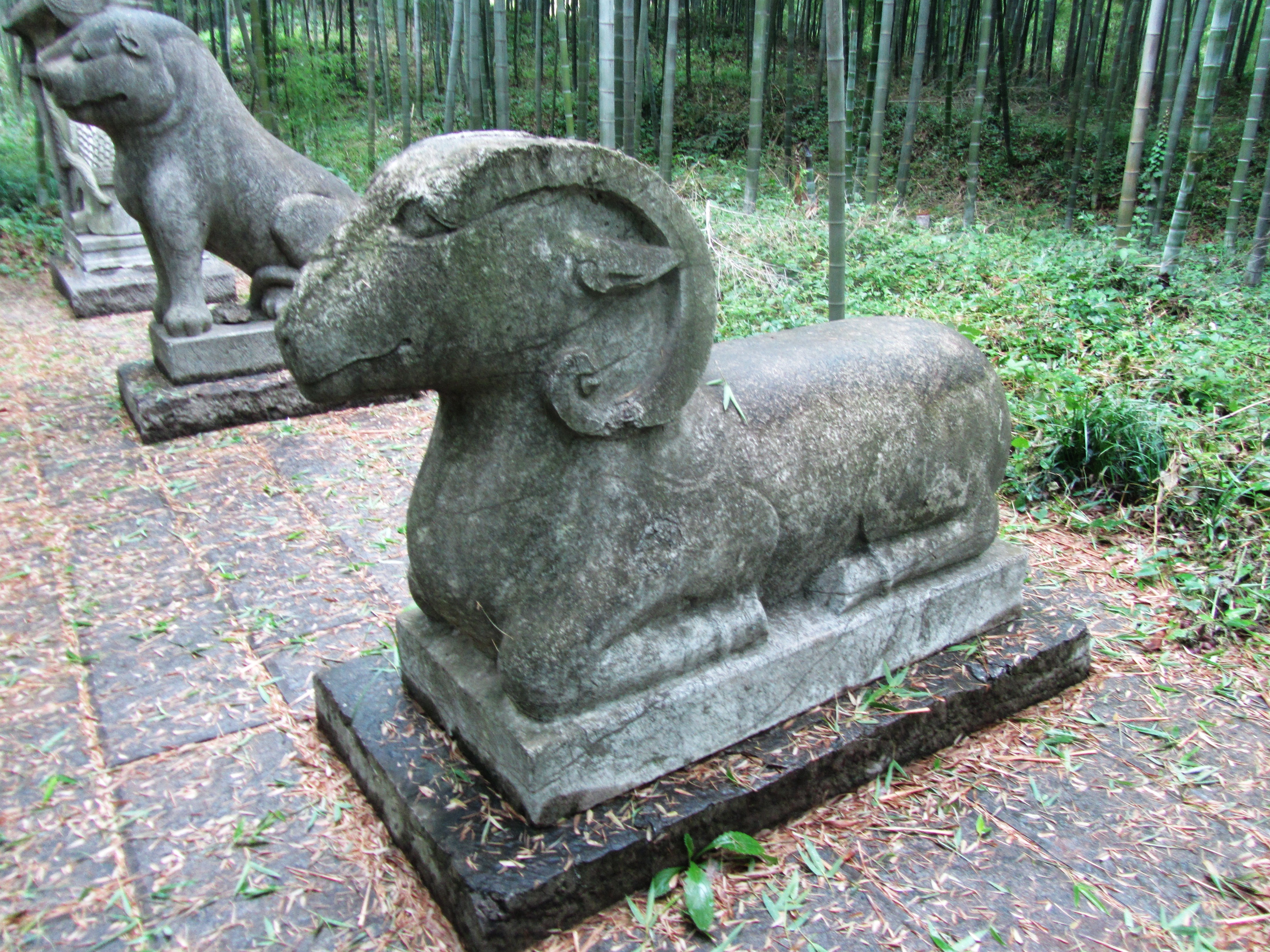
Stone sheep.

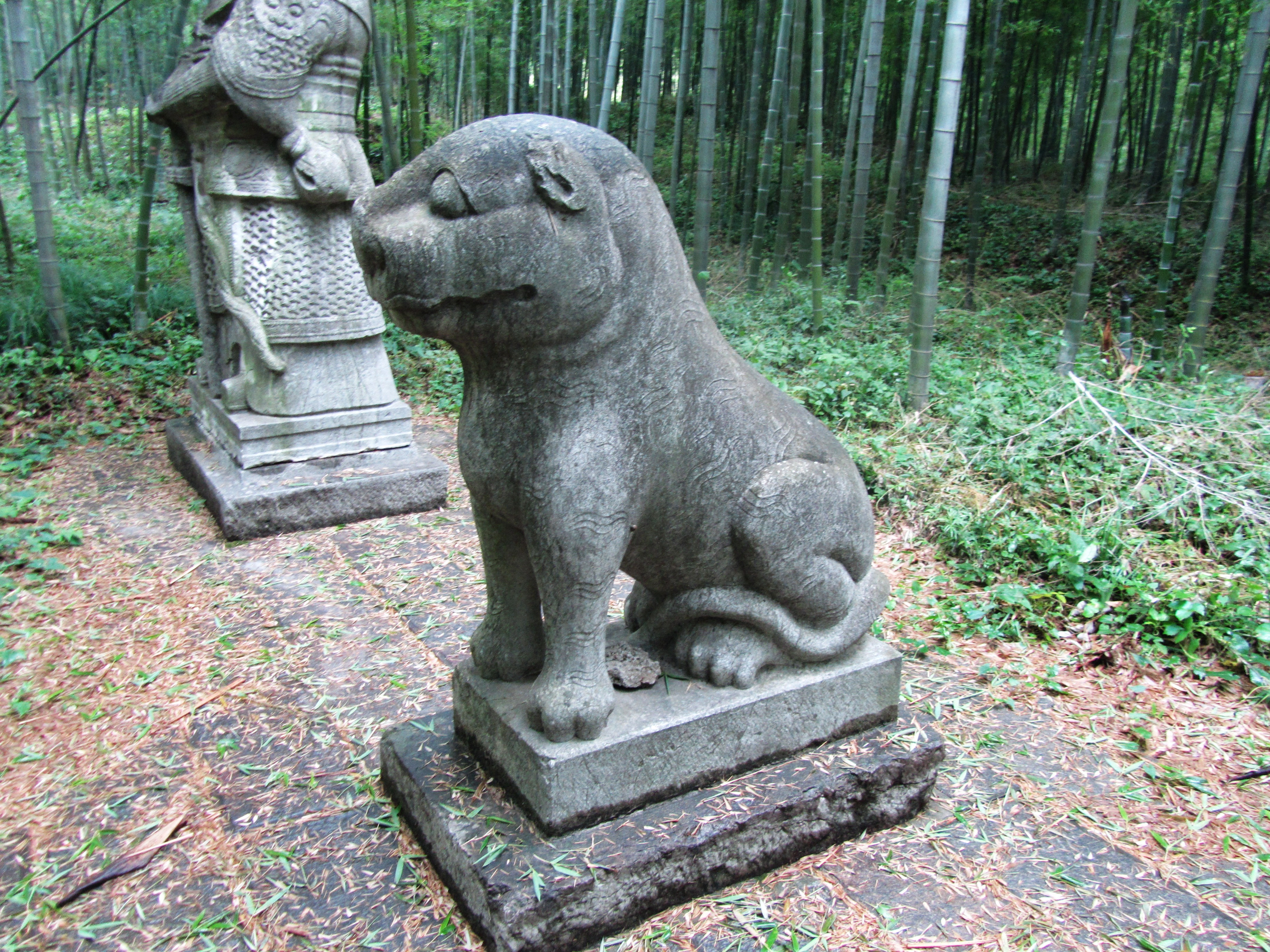
Stone tiger.

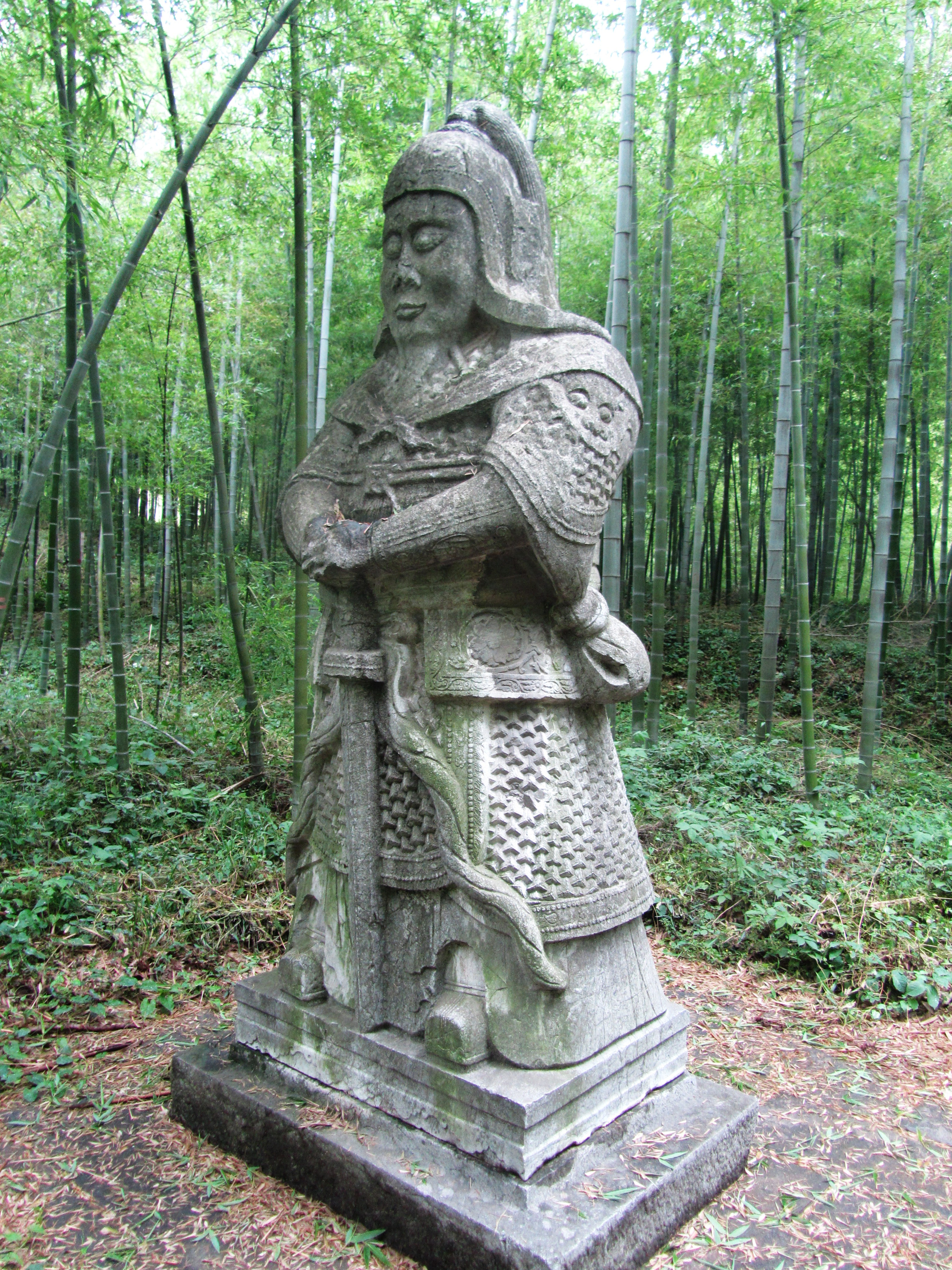
Stone warrior.

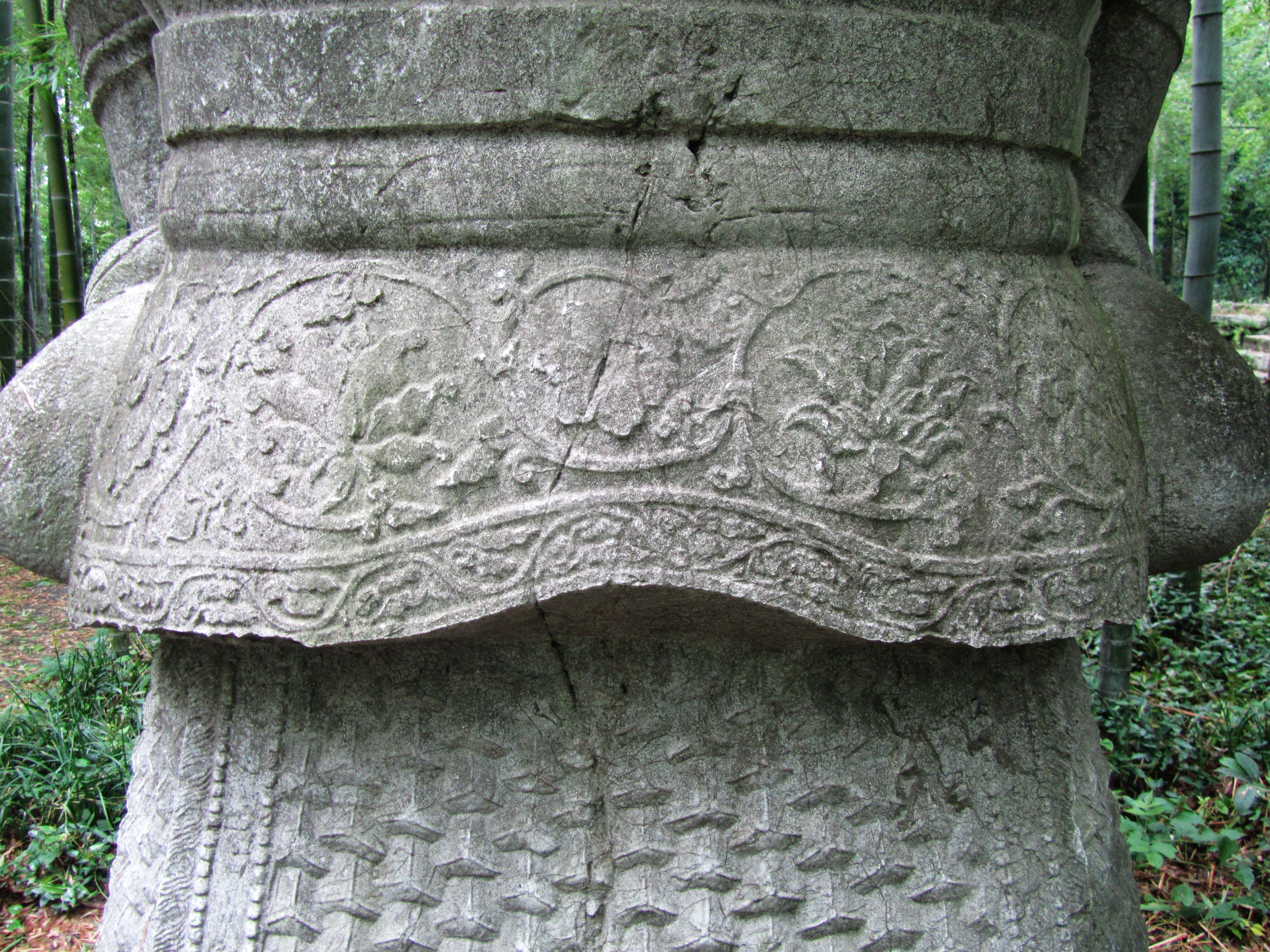
Stone armour.

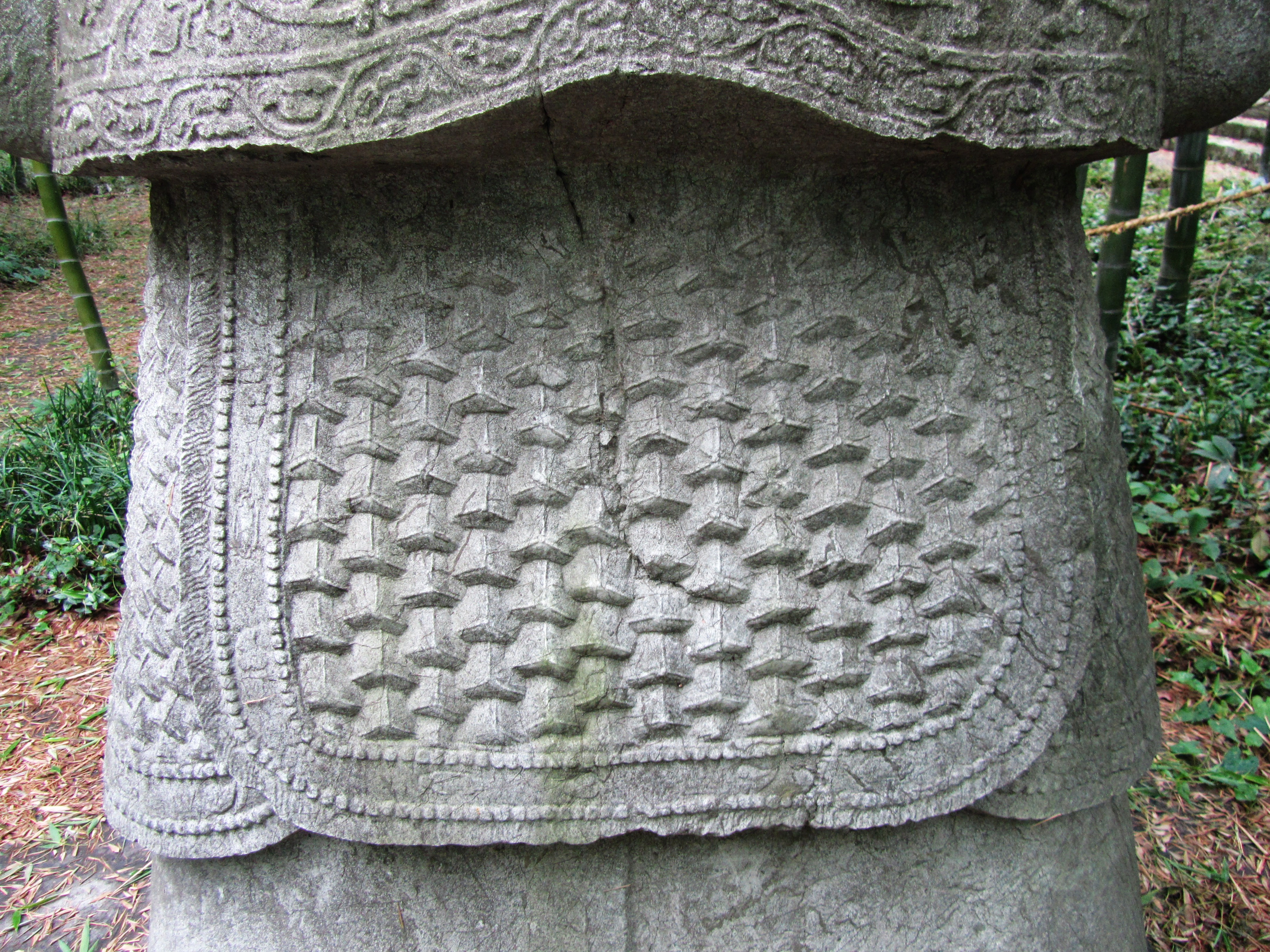
Stone armour.

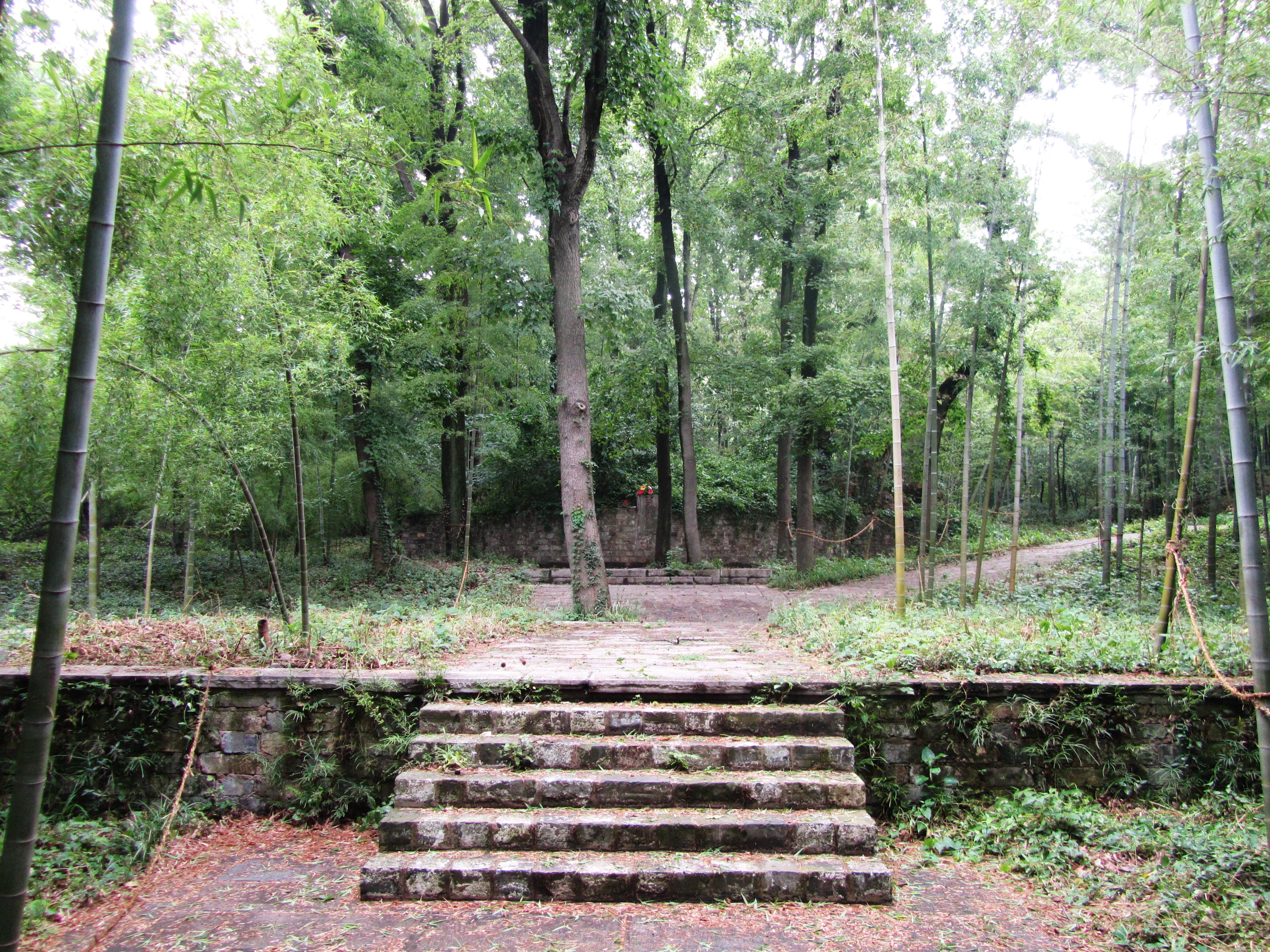
Site.

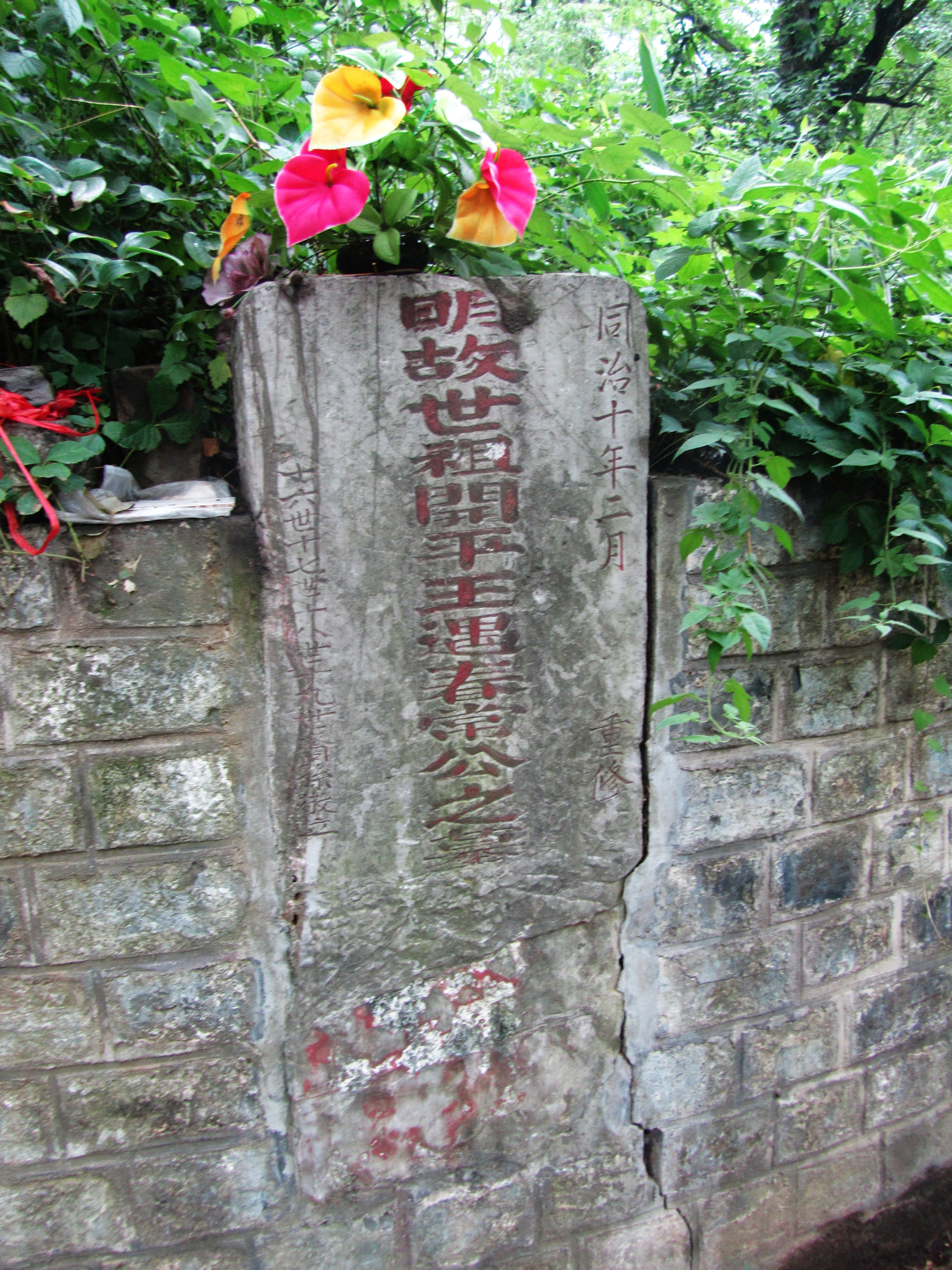
Grave monument.

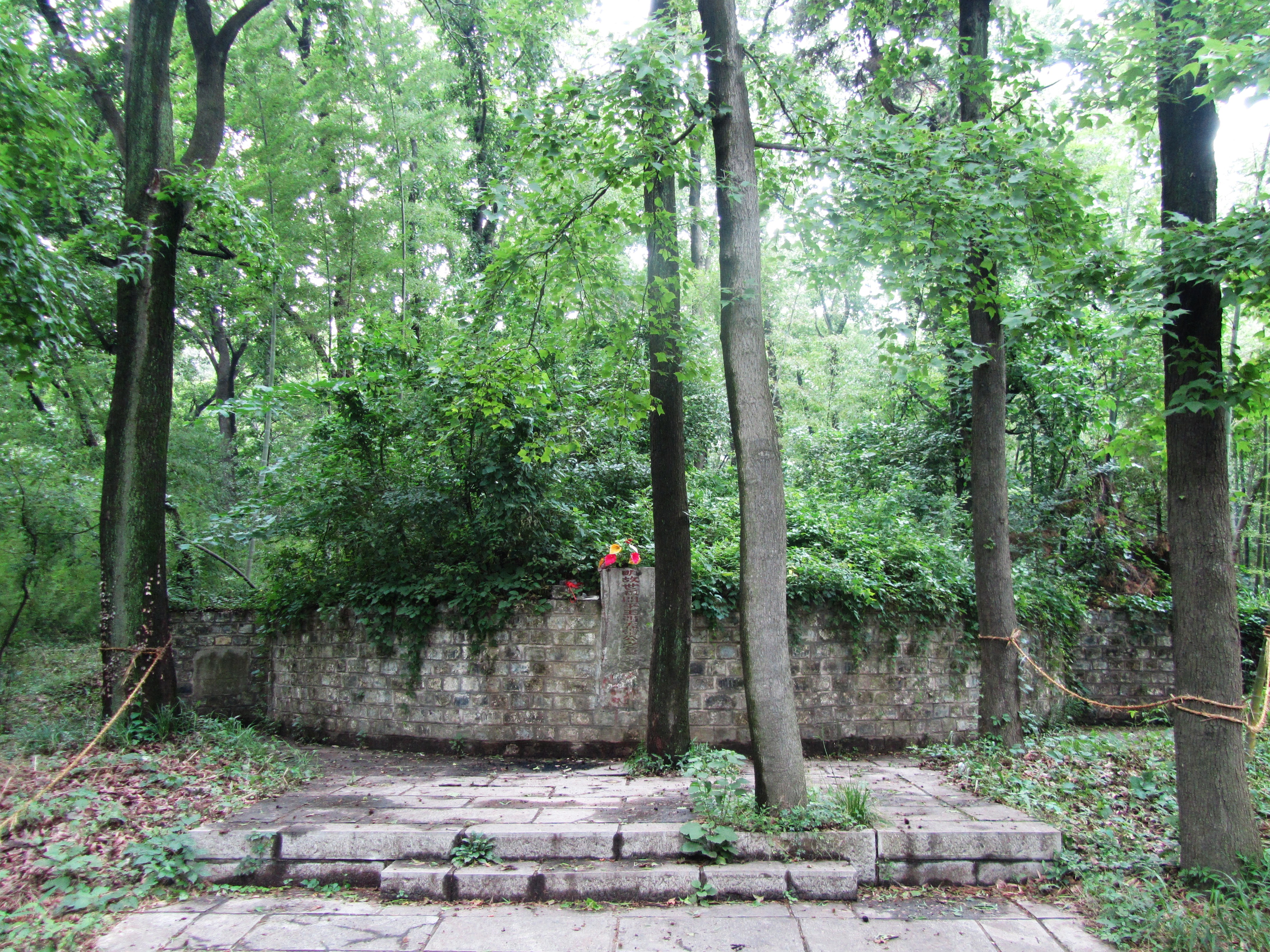
Tomb

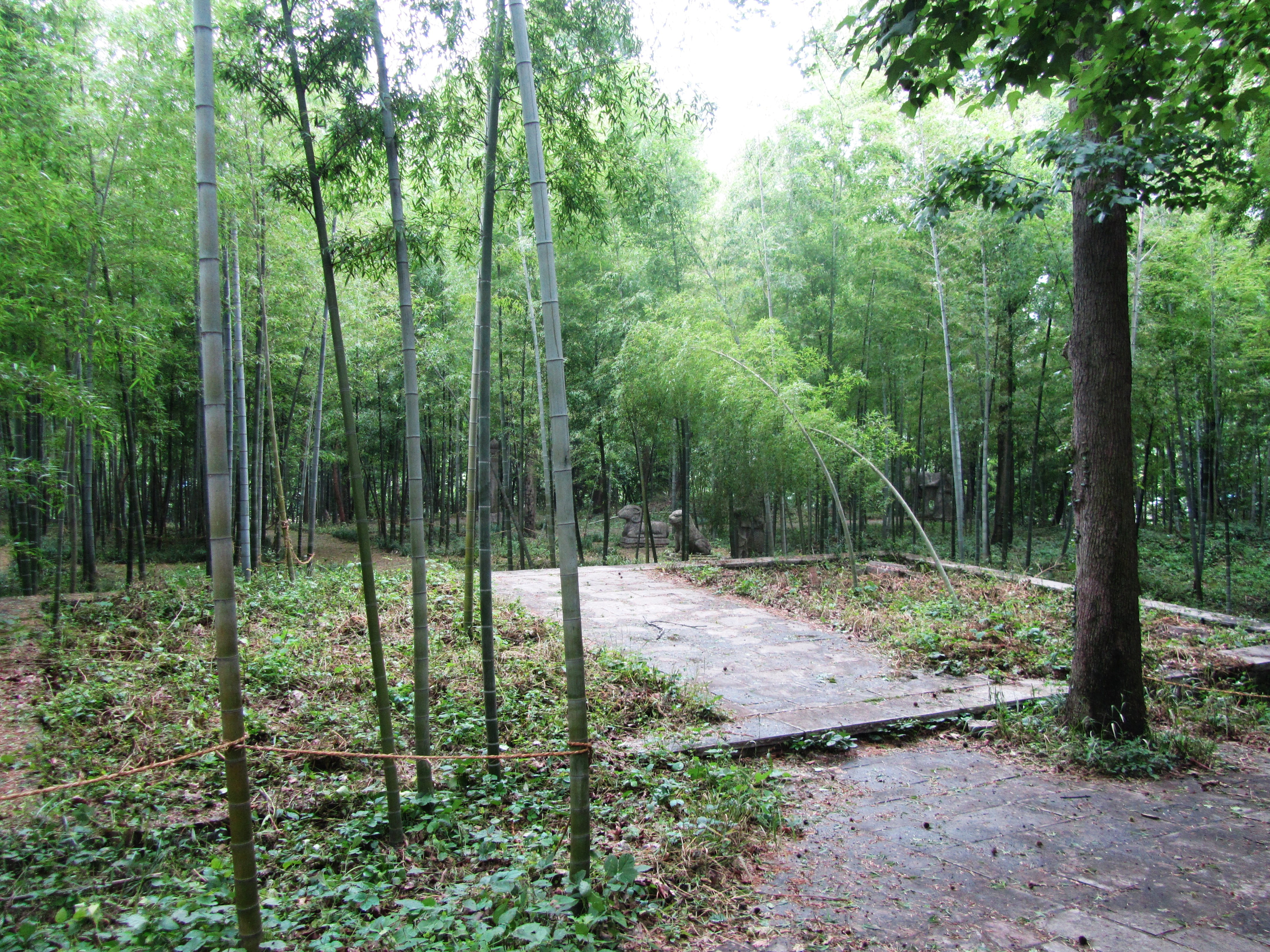
Road paved with stone
