= Liu Zhibai =

Chinese painter (1915–2003)

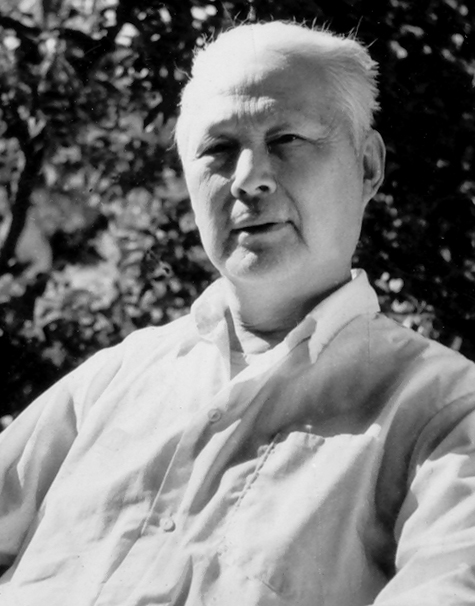
- Liu Zhibai
- Born: 24/11/1915; Fengyang, Anhui, China
- Died: 14/08/2003; Guiyang, Guizhou, China
- Known for: Painting & Drawing

Liu Zhibai (1915–2003) was a Chinese ink painter. Liu studied in Suzhou in 1933, in China's best art school at the time: the Suzhou Fine Arts College (this school had exhibited in the 1920s more than 500 famous plaster sculptures, and brought from France nearly ten thousand albums of Western art).

He studied under Gu Yanping, director of the Chinese painting department of Suzhou Fine Arts College. The Gu family is a large family of well-known Chinese collectors. The "Guoyun Pavilion" established by this family has been collecting the works of many great artists in the history of Chinese art for nearly a century, dating from the Tang dynasty to the Qing dynasty. Starting from 1935, Liu Zhibai lived for a long time at the Guoyun Pavilion. There he studied and explored, under Professor Gu Yanping's guidance, the works of the great Chinese painters and learned ancient art history. During the Second World War, Japan invaded China. Liu Zhibai then embarked on a journey of exile that lasted eight years. He finally returned to his home county of Fengyang in 1946 to teach art in a college. In 1948, during the Chinese Civil War, Liu Zhibai fled the war and traveled to Guangxi Province. In December of the same year, he proposed his first theory of painting, External Learning Focused on the Ego, in Quanzhou County, birth country of Shi Tao, a great Chinese painter.

Throughout his 50 years of artistic creation, Liu Zhibai has studied all the landscapes of the Yunnan-Guizhou Plateau while continuing to nurture his passion for ancient Chinese art. The artist, who has always been independent and meticulously explored the journey to artistic creation, finally reached the peak of his own artistic creation towards the end of his life. He created a new artistic style, different from the Millennium ink painting of Chinese art, expressing his choice of lifestyle and artistic expression, breaking from secular society. Because of his unique and self-artistic expression, Liu Zhibai wasn't recognized by the Chinese artistic community until his death. Fifteen years after his death, his explorations of art with Chinese ink and his great contribution to the artistic mind have come to be more and more appreciated. Art historians discovered him and devoted research trials to him. The first historian claimed that the roots of Zhibai's art strongly owed to the Song and Yuan dynasties, to which was added a hint of the artistic style of the Ming and Qing dynasties. He affirmed that the artist had been inspired by both the essence of traditional Chinese arts and the innovation of artistic language. His 60 years of careful study of ancient art techniques and the pursuit of artistic and coherent innovation have helped him to create new ink painting techniques with which he unveiled Chinese landscapes only from the age of 80.

Liu became the last guardian of Chinese painting and a pioneer of innovation in the new century: the art of ink painting, which he fathered in the last years of his life, marked a turning point between Chinese tradition and modernity. It puts forth the historical trend of abstract art and the performance of Chinese ink painting in the 21st century. After Liu Zhibai's death, a number of publishing houses have released a total of 15 monographs and over 20 research journals with titles such as Book of Famous Artists of Modern and Contemporary Chinese Paintings - Liu Zhibai, Book of Paintings by Liu Zhibai, Qian Mountain Characters - Liu Zhibai's Art, Freshness of Painting, Ink Traces and Poetic Drunkenness - Ink Landscape Paintings, Defending Black by Appreciating White - The Art of Liu Zhibai. More than 90 of his works are now part of collections owned by multiple art institutions, including the National Art Museum of China, the National Chinese Academy of Painting, the Guizhou Provincial Museum, the Provincial Institute of History and Guizhou Culture, Anhui Provincial Museum of History and Culture, and Anhui Provincial Museum of Art.

== Artistic background ==
In the early 1970s, Liu lived in a mountain village near the Xima River in Longli County, Guizhou Province. In the late 1970s, he began a new period of artistic creation, which has for main theme the landscape of the Qian Mountain, painted in ink. In 1984, the Guizhou Provincial Museum collected four pieces of landscape paintings and a piece of flower painting.

- In 1985, Liu organized his own solo exhibition in Guiyang. In the same year, the Guiyang Art Publishing House published the book Compilation of Paintings by Liu Zhibai and Jiang Menggu. In 1988, his new works were exhibited at the Central Academy of Fine Arts in Beijing.
- In 1987, Liu was hired as a librarian at the Guizhou Provincial Museum of Cultural History. In December 1999, Liu Zhibai's Compilation of Works was published by the Guizhou People's Publishing House.
- In 2000, the artist created more than 100 works using a completely new technique of ink painting, and exhibited them at the Guizhou Provincial Museum. This exhibition is welcomed by experts. At the same time, the Federation of Literary Circles and the association of Chinese artists of Guiyang City are organizing a "Liu Zhibai Chinese Painting Symposium" in Guiyang. Many of his works are acquired by the Museum of Cultural History, as well as other museums and individuals in Guizhou Province and elsewhere.
- In 2013, "Liu Zhibai Chinese Painting Exhibition" finally takes place. The Liu Zhibai Chinese Painting Exhibition and the Liu Zhibai Art Symposium, both sponsored by the Chinese National Academy of Arts, the Creative Research Department of the Chinese National Academy of Painting and the Art Museum, are inaugurated on July 1, 2013, at the National Art Museum of China. The exhibition brings together more than 100 works on landscapes and flowers made by Liu Zhibai from 1938 to 2003. The exhibition presents the history of Mr. Liu Zhibai's art, an artist who studied and explored Chinese painting while bringing innovation for almost a century.
- In February 2018, more than 12 masterpieces by Liu Zhibai are exhibited for the first time in France.
- In April 2018, more than 12 masterpieces by Liu Zhibai are exhibited for the seconde time in Annonay France.

== Social assessment ==
In Investment Value Analysis of 30 Contemporary Chinese Painters, Liu Zhibai was named one of the 30 Most Academic and Most Valued Painters of the Contemporary Age, including Master Wu Guanzhong.

Feng Qiyong, former vice president and scholar of the China Academy of Arts, amazed by Liu's paintaings, volunteered to write a preface to the compilation of his paintings. His appreciation of Liu Zhibai's art is evident in the following quote: "Liu Lao's painting embodies authentic Chinese style and unique Chinese charm. We know how rich is the Chinese artistic tradition, particularly the pictorial tradition, and how much pictorial arts develop under the brush of the literati. Under Liu Zhibai’s brush, the semantic fields remains diverse, no term predominates. Since the origins of landscape painting, Master Liu's paintings show or exceed the charm of Shi Tao and Shi Xi. The landscapes he depicts seem born from the real mountains and rivers of Guizhou, sparkling with natural freshness. His works reveal the greatest enjoyment of nature – there is not the slightest feeling of obsolescence remains, on the contrary, every single detail is refreshing. We find the authentic charm of the real water of Guizhou! To me, Liu's painting was personalized, and he found himself confused with the world, including landscapes and their natural environment. He knew how to reach the ideal state pursued by all painters! "
