= Xiquan, Gansu =

Xiquan 喜泉镇
- Town
- Location in Gansu
- Coordinates: 37°4′48″N 104°1′38″E
- Country: People's Republic of China
- Province: Gansu
- Prefecture-level city: Baiyin
- County: Jingtai County
- Time zone: UTC+8 (China Standard)

Xiquan (Chinese: 喜泉; pinyin: Xǐquán) is a town under the administration of Jingtai County, Gansu, China. As of 2023, it administers Min'an Residential Community (民安社区) and the following seventeen villages:

- Dashuizha Village (大水䃎村)
- Xijishui Village (喜集水村)
- Xingquan Village (兴泉村)
- Santang Village (三塘村)
- Beitan Village (北滩村)
- Yuliang Village (余梁村)
- Xinzhuang Village (新庄村)
- Xinmin Village (新民村)
- Shangba Village (尚坝村)
- Nantan Village (南滩村)
- Chenzhuang Village (陈庄村)
- Da'an Village (大安村)
- Fulu Village (福禄村)
- Malian Village (马莲村)
- Zhongxin Village (中心村)
- Santaijing Village (三台井村)
- Huajian Village (铧尖村)
