= Fengyang County =

Fengyang 凤阳县
- County
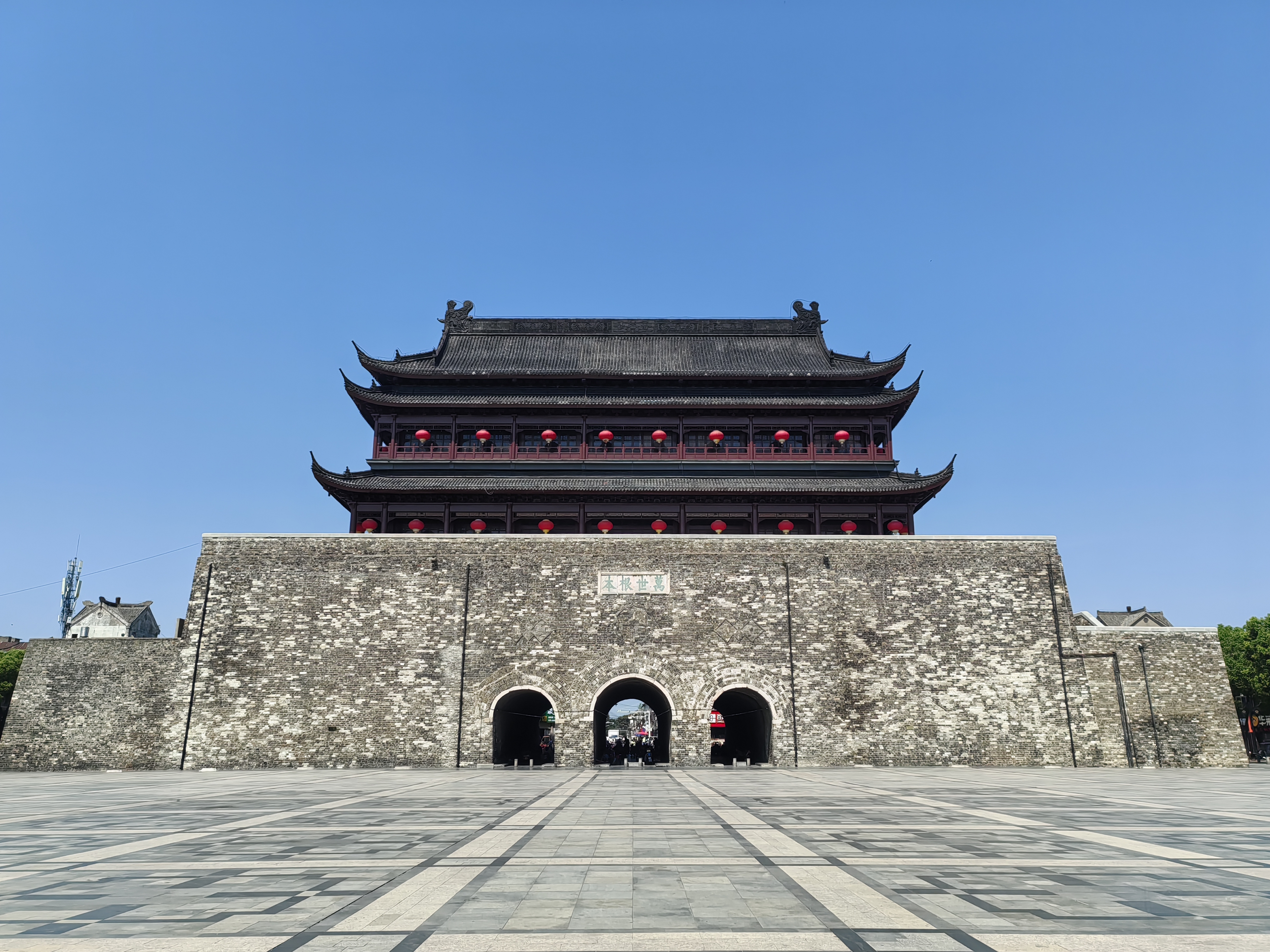
- Fengyang Drum Tower in August 2024, prior to a roof collapse in May 2025
- Interactive map of Fengyang
- Coordinates (Fengyang County government): 32°52′33″N 117°31′54″E
- Country: People's Republic of China
- Province: Anhui
- Prefecture-level city: Chuzhou

Area
  - Total: 1,949.5 km^{2} (752.7 sq mi)

Population (2018)
  - Total: 683,200
- Time zone: UTC+8 (China Standard)
- Postal code: 233100
- Division code: FYG

Fengyang County (simplified Chinese: 凤阳县; traditional Chinese: 鳳陽縣; pinyin: Fèngyáng Xiàn) is a county in north-central Anhui Province, China. It is under the administration of Chuzhou, a prefecture-level city. The county was home to 765,600 people as of 2013.

== Administrative divisions ==
Fengyang County is divided into 14 towns and 1 township. The county seat is in Fucheng Town.

=== 14 Towns ===
The county is home to the following 14 towns:

- Banqiao (板桥镇)
- Damiao (大庙镇)
- Fucheng (府城镇)
- Guantang (官塘镇)
- Hongxin (红心镇)
- Liufu (刘府镇)
- Wudian (武店镇)
- Xiquan (西泉镇)
- Linhuaiguan (临淮关镇)
- Zaoxiang (枣巷镇)
- Yinjian (殷涧镇)
- Zongpu (总铺镇)
- Xiaoxihe (小溪河镇)
- Daxihe (大溪河镇)

=== 1 Township ===
The county's sole township is:

- Huangwan (黄湾乡).

== Geography ==
The county's northern border is formed by the Huai River and neighboring Wuhe County. The county is also home to the Huayuan Lake, which totals about 30 square kilometers in size.

=== Climate ===
The average annual temperature for Fengyang County is 14.9 °C, and the average annual precipitation is 904.4 mm.

Climate data for Fengyang, elevation 25 m (82 ft), (1991–2020 normals, extremes 1981–present)
Month	Jan	Feb	Mar	Apr	May	Jun	Jul	Aug	Sep	Oct	Nov	Dec	Year
Record high °C (°F)	20.5 (68.9)	25.9 (78.6)	33.8 (92.8)	33.8 (92.8)	37.2 (99.0)	38.2 (100.8)	39.7 (103.5)	39.5 (103.1)	37.6 (99.7)	33.1 (91.6)	29.7 (85.5)	22.9 (73.2)	39.7 (103.5)
Mean daily maximum °C (°F)	6.6 (43.9)	9.7 (49.5)	14.9 (58.8)	21.4 (70.5)	26.7 (80.1)	30.0 (86.0)	32.0 (89.6)	31.2 (88.2)	27.4 (81.3)	22.5 (72.5)	15.8 (60.4)	9.1 (48.4)	20.6 (69.1)
Daily mean °C (°F)	1.5 (34.7)	4.3 (39.7)	9.3 (48.7)	15.5 (59.9)	20.9 (69.6)	25.1 (77.2)	27.8 (82.0)	26.9 (80.4)	22.4 (72.3)	16.6 (61.9)	9.8 (49.6)	3.6 (38.5)	15.3 (59.5)
Mean daily minimum °C (°F)	−2.5 (27.5)	0.1 (32.2)	4.4 (39.9)	10.0 (50.0)	15.5 (59.9)	20.7 (69.3)	24.4 (75.9)	23.6 (74.5)	18.5 (65.3)	11.9 (53.4)	5.1 (41.2)	−0.6 (30.9)	10.9 (51.7)
Record low °C (°F)	−19.6 (−3.3)	−15.4 (4.3)	−6.5 (20.3)	−0.6 (30.9)	5.2 (41.4)	11.7 (53.1)	16.9 (62.4)	15.9 (60.6)	8.3 (46.9)	−0.3 (31.5)	−9.0 (15.8)	−17.7 (0.1)	−19.6 (−3.3)
Average precipitation mm (inches)	34.8 (1.37)	39.9 (1.57)	56.1 (2.21)	55.9 (2.20)	79.4 (3.13)	155.5 (6.12)	191.5 (7.54)	163.2 (6.43)	85.1 (3.35)	47.9 (1.89)	44.8 (1.76)	26.4 (1.04)	980.5 (38.61)
Average precipitation days (≥ 0.1 mm)	7.1	8.3	8.5	8.6	8.6	9.6	12.5	12.1	8.2	7.3	7.5	6.2	104.5
Average snowy days	4.3	3.0	1.4	0.1	0	0	0	0	0	0	0.7	1.6	11.1
Average relative humidity (%)	75	74	72	72	72	75	82	83	80	76	75	74	76
Mean monthly sunshine hours	131.1	132.2	168.2	195.5	203.6	174.6	194.0	190.4	171.4	167.4	151.1	143.0	2,022.5
Percentage possible sunshine	41	42	45	50	47	41	45	46	47	48	49	46	46
Source: China Meteorological Administration

== History ==
=== Pre-Ming Dynasty ===
During the Xia, Shang and early Zhou dynasties, the Dongyi peoples inhabited this area and were collectively known as the Huaiyi after the Huai River. During the late Western Zhou Period and the early Spring and Autumn period, the Dongyi became increasingly sinicized and formed their own states. During the late Spring and Autumn period, the once-powerful Dongyi state of Xu was pressured from all directions and destroyed through a series of wars with its neighbors, such as the Chu State and the Wu State. Another Dongyi State was the small Zhongli State, which was a part of the Huaiyi Confederation led by the State of Xu. Tombs belonging to the royalty of the Zhongli State were discovered in excavations between 2005 and 2008 near Fengyang. Eventually, the Huaiyi peoples were either pushed south or assimilated.

=== Ming Dynasty ===
Fengyang's best known historical site is linked with the name of the county's most famous native, Zhu Yuanzhang (1328–1398). Although coming from a poor family, he became an important rebel leader and, later, the founder of China's Ming Dynasty. Once entrenched as the Hongwu Emperor in nearby Nanjing, he honored the memory of his father, Zhu Wusi (d. 1344), and his mother, Lady Chen, by posthumously raising them to imperial dignity, and building for them an imperial-style mausoleum, known as Ming Huangling (明皇陵, literally, "Ming Imperial Mausoleum"). The emperor even started building the new imperial capital, named Zhongdu (中都; 'The Central Capital') near his childhood hometown, but the project was eventually abandoned. The stone figures of the Huangling Mausoleum have survived, and have been re-erected at the original location, some 7 km (4.3 mi) south of the county seat (32°48′50″N 117°31′10″E). The mausoleum statuary and the remains of the capital-building project are protected as a national historic site known as "Zhongdu Imperial City of the Ming and the Imperial Mausoleum's Statuary" (Chinese: 明中都皇故城及皇陵石刻; pinyin: Míng Zhōngdū Huánggùchéng jí Huánglíng Shíkè), often shortened to Chinese: 明中都; pinyin: Míng Zhōngdū. The Hongwu Emperor resettled people from Shandong, Guangdong, Hebei, Shanxi and Lake Taihu into Fengyang. In 1370, existing counties in the area were merged into a new county, named Linhuai County.

=== Qing Dynasty ===
In 1754, Linhuai County was restructured into a new county called Fengyang County, which serves as the descendant of the modern Fengyang County.

=== Recent History ===
The county's borders are jurisdiction has changed numerous times since its Qing-era formation. From 1959 to 1960, during the Great Leap Forward, 60,245 people of the county died, occupying 17.7 percent to its total population of 335,698. 8,404 complete households were wiped out.

In 1974, future Chinese Premier Li Keqiang was sent to Damiao, Fengyang County as part of Mao Zedong's Down to the Countryside Program. Here, he did manual labour throughout the day and studied for university, Li recounts his days in the county as "hard times". He rose up to the rank of Damiao's Communist Party branch secretary in 1976, before leaving for Peking University in 1978.

== Economy ==
Fengyang County's natural resources include limestone, quartz, marble, vermiculite, and asbestos.

== Transportation ==
Key highways in the county include the G36 Expressway, Anhui Provincial Highway 101, Anhui Provincial Highway 207, Anhui Provincial Highway 307, and Anhui Provincial Highway 310. The Beijing-Shanghai High Speed Rail also passes through the county.

== Notable people ==
- Liu Zhibai, Chinese ink painter
- Zhu Yuanzhang, founder of the Ming Dynasty

== See also ==
- Fengyang Flower Drum, a famous folk song genre from Fengyang County
- Ming Ancestral Tomb, the tomb of Zhu Yuanzhang's grandfather, great-grandfather, and great-great-grandfather
- Xiaogang, Anhui, a village in Xiaoxihe town
