= Yinjian, Anhui =

Yinjian 殷涧镇
- Town
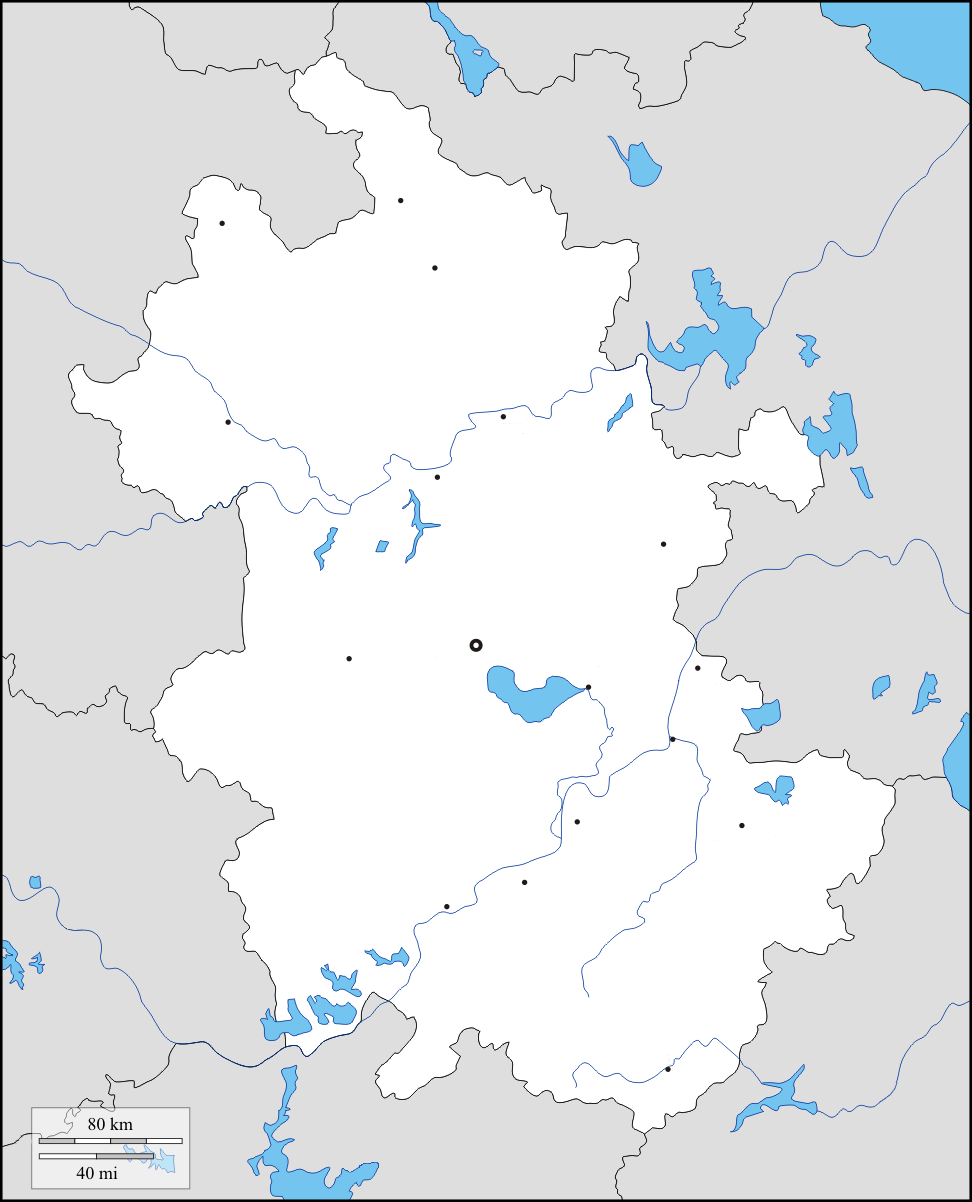
- Location in Anhui
- Coordinates: 32°43′35″N 117°37′5″E
- Country: People's Republic of China
- Province: Anhui
- Prefecture-level city: Chuzhou
- County: Fengyang County
- Time zone: UTC+8 (China Standard)

Yinjian (simplified Chinese: 殷涧; traditional Chinese: 殷澗; pinyin: Yīnjiàn) is a town under the administration of Fengyang County, Anhui, China. As of 2023, it administers Baiyunshan Forestry Area (白云山林场), Dayinshan Forestry Area (大银山林场), and the following twelve villages:

- Yinbei Village (殷北村)
- Fengyin Village (凤殷村)
- Qingshan Village (青山村)
- Gutang Village (古塘村)
- Fengyangshan Village (凤阳山村)
- Hongshan Village (洪山村)
- Baiyun Village (白云村)
- Shajian Village (沙涧村)
- Henan Village (河南村)
- Songji Village (宋集村)
- Xiedian Village (卸店村)
