= Xiquan, Anhui =

Xiquan 西泉镇
- Town
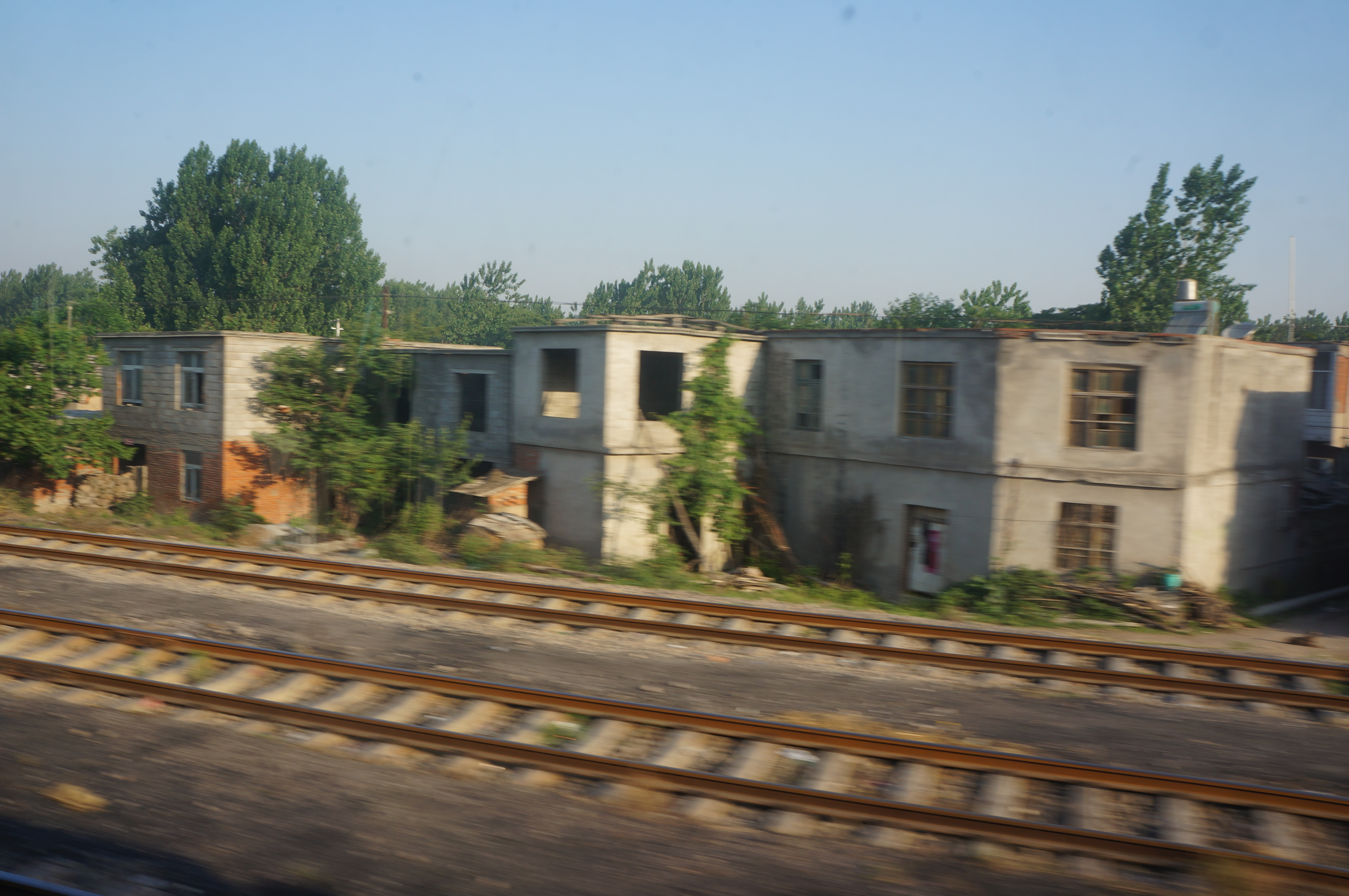
- View from the train

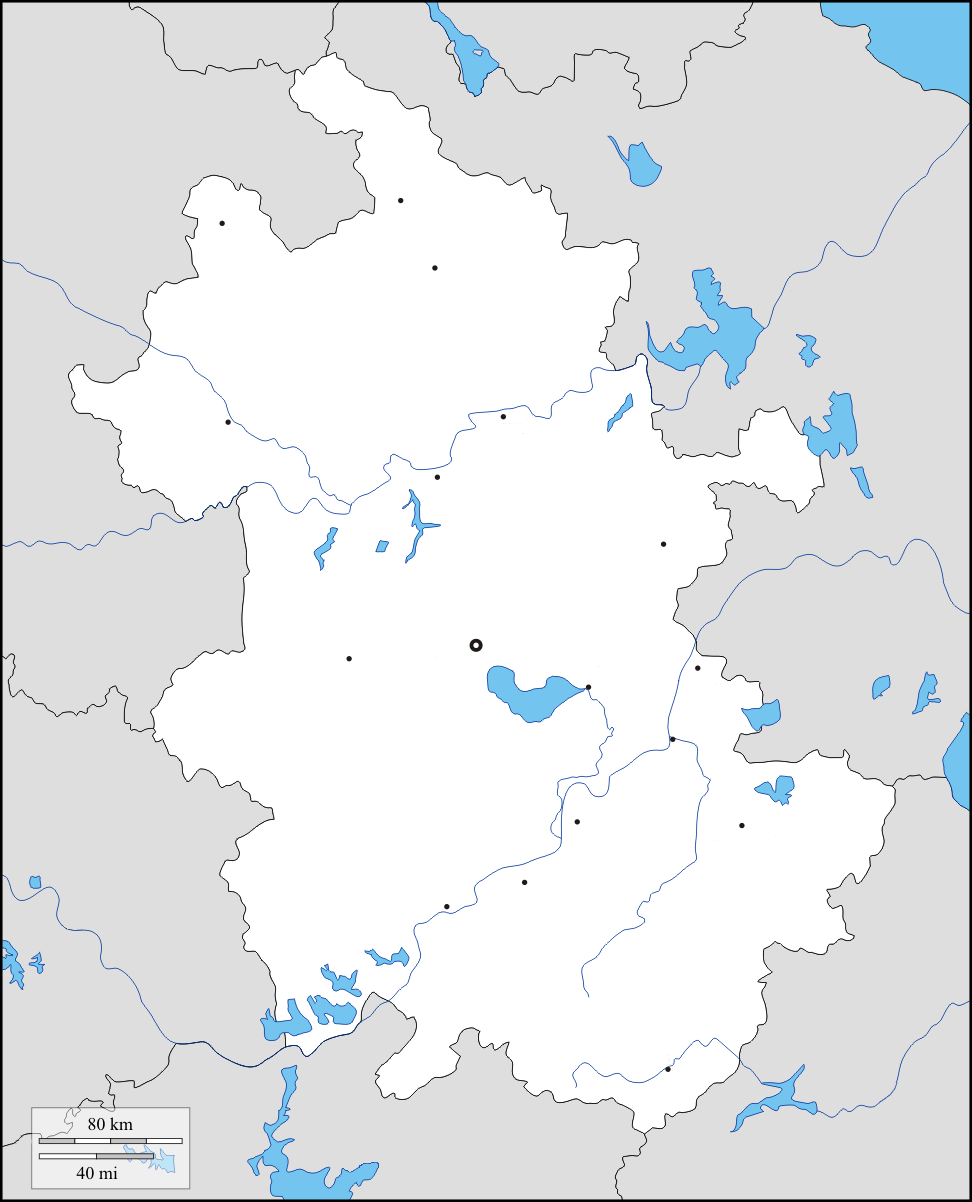
- Location in Anhui
- Coordinates: 32°45′57″N 117°16′6″E
- Country: People's Republic of China
- Province: Anhui
- Prefecture-level city: Chuzhou
- County: Fengyang County
- Time zone: UTC+8 (China Standard)

Xiquan (Chinese: 西泉; pinyin: Xīquán) is a town under the administration of Fengyang County, Anhui, China. As of 2023, it administers Xiquan Residential Community and the following eleven villages:

- Gongji Village (宫集村)
- Yutang Village (禹塘村)
- Xinjian Village (新建村)
- Huantang Village (欢塘村)
- Jiang Village (蒋村)
- Panlong Village (盘龙村)
- Gongzhuang Village (宫庄村)
- Yaoying Village (姚郢村)
- Kaoxi Village (考西村)
- Kaodong Village (考东村)
- Quanxin Village (全心村)
