= Dilang =

Dilang (Chinese: 地狼; pinyin: Dì láng; Wade–Giles: Ti^{4} Lang^{2}; lit. 'Earth Wolf') and Xiquan (Chinese: 犀犬; pinyin: Xī quǎn; Wade–Giles: Hsi^{1} Ch'üan^{3}; lit. 'Hole Dog') are canines that, according to Chinese legend, live underground. The 4th-century BC text Shizi states: "If there be a dog under the earth, it is called ti-lang [dilang]." They are also called Jia (simplified Chinese: 贾; traditional Chinese: 賈).

== Stories ==
According to Gan Bao's 4th-century story collection In Search of the Supernatural, during the yuankang period (c. 291–299) of Emperor Hui of Jin's reign, a man named Huai Yao (懷瑤) in Lou County (婁縣), Wu Commandery discovered two underground Xiquan puppies, "one male and a female, whose eyes had not yet opened", both of which were larger than normal dogs. He had begun to dig into the earth after hearing "distant sounds of dogs" and discovering a burrow hole "the size of a serpent's retreat". After Huai returned the puppies to their den and covered it with an old grindstone, he failed to find it the next day.

Gan Bao's book also mentioned another discovery, that of the Grand Protector of Wu Commandery, Zhang Mao (張茂), which supposedly took place during the taixing period (c. 318–321) of Emperor Yuan of Jin's reign. Zhang had heard sounds of dogs beneath his bed but could not find the source; finally the earth cracked open and revealed two puppies. He tried to rear them, but they both died; later, in the year 322, he was killed during Wang Dun's rebellion.

A similar story is found in the official historical text Book of Jin (648) about Sun Wuzhong (孫無終), a general under Emperor Xiaowu of Jin, who found two white puppies, also one gender each, under his residence in Jiyang County (既陽縣). Sun also tried but failed to rear them; he was soon killed in 402 by the rebel Huan Xuan.

According to the same chapter in Book of Jin, in the year 434, a man named He Xu (何旭) in Qian County (灊縣) also found two puppies underground; their thin and "blue" mother escaped. He Xu also tried to rear them; the female died but the male survived and grew to be "good at devouring beasts". Later, He Xu's village was destroyed by "barbarians".

The Ming dynasty government official Xie Zhaozhe (謝肇淛; 1567–1624) mentioned a "recent" story from Changzhou (長洲): for several nights puppy sounds were heard from underground; but nothing was discovered after much digging.
