= Sun Yat-sen Memorial Hall (Guangzhou) =

Building in Guangzhou, Guangdong, China

- 中山纪念堂
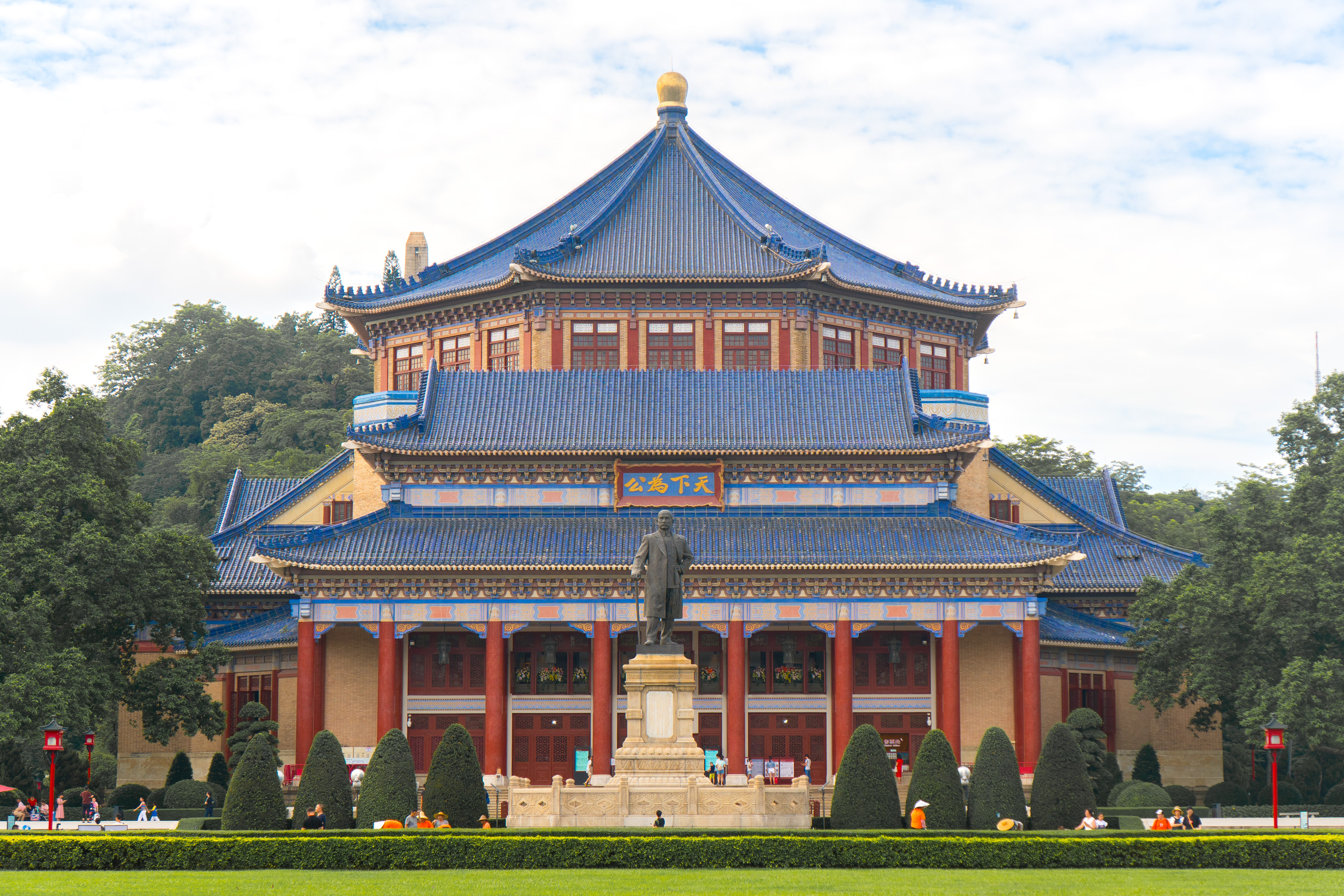
- Interactive map of Sun Yat-sen Memorial Hall
- Location: Guangzhou, Guangdong, China
- Coordinates: 23°08′06″N 113°15′54″E
- Type: Memorial
- Material: Steel and concrete
- Height: 49 m (161 ft)
- Beginning date: 1929
- Completion date: October, 1931
- Dedicated to: Sun Yat-sen

Sun Yat-sen Memorial Hall
- Simplified Chinese: 中山纪念堂
- Traditional Chinese: 中山紀念堂
Transcriptions
Standard Mandarin
- Hanyu Pinyin: Zhōngshān Jìniàntáng
- Bopomofo: ㄓㄨㄥ ㄕㄢ ㄐㄧˋ ㄋㄧㄢˋ ㄊㄤˊ
- Wade–Giles: Chung^{1}-shan^{1} Chi^{4}-nien^{4}-t‘ang^{2}
- IPA: [ʈʂʊ́ŋ.ʂán tɕî.njɛ̂n.tʰǎŋ]
Yue: Cantonese
- Yale Romanization: Jūngsāan Géinihmtòhng
- Jyutping: zung1 saan1 gei2 nim6 tong4
- IPA: [tsʊŋ˥.san˥ kej˧˥.nim˨.tʰɔŋ˩]

The Sun Yat-sen or Zhongshan Memorial Hall is an octagon-shaped building in Guangzhou, capital of China's Guangdong Province. The hall was designed by Lu Yanzhi and was built with funds raised by local and overseas Chinese people in memory of Sun Yat-sen. Construction work commenced in 1929 and completed in 1931. The hall is a large octagonal structure with a span of 71 metres (233 ft) without pillars, housing a large stage and seats 3,240 people.

== History ==
The memorial hall stands on the site of Guangzhou's Presidential Palace during the Constitutional Protection Movement, when the Nationalists operated a rival "Chinese" government to the Zhili Clique's Beijing regime. The palace was damaged during Ye Ju's 16 June 1922 attack on Sun Yat-sen, during which—though he had already fled—his wife narrowly escaped shelling and rifle fire before meeting him on the gunboat Yongfeng, where they were joined by Chiang Kai-shek. The hall itself has been severely damaged and repaired several times until 1998, when it was comprehensively upgraded to its present-day condition. A statue of Sun Yat-sen was erected in front of the main entrance.

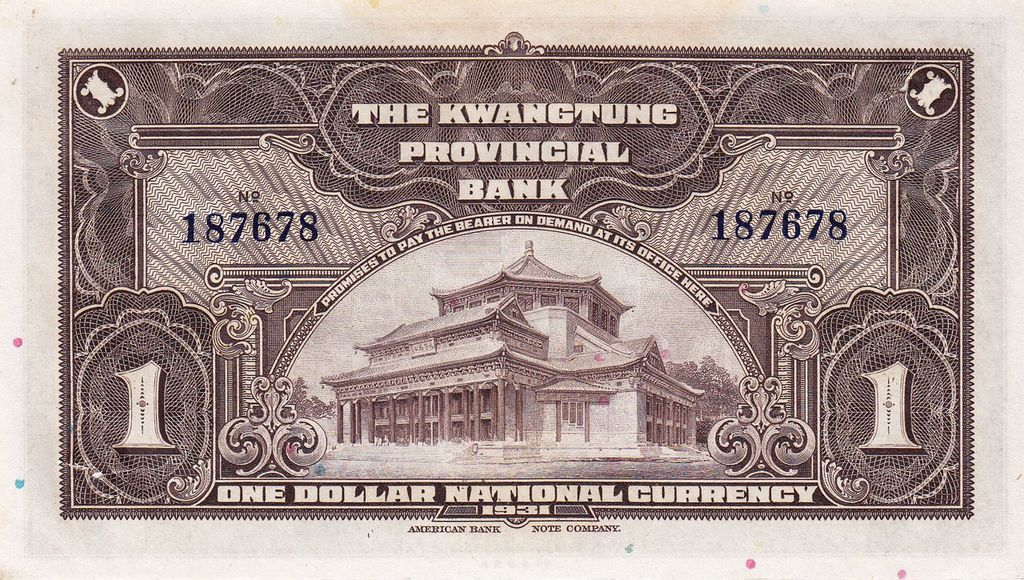
Sun Yat-sen Memorial Hall depicted on the reverse of a 1931 Kwangtung Provincial Bank 1 Dollar Banknote.

== Transportation ==
The memorial hall is accessible from Sun Yat-sen Memorial Hall Station of Guangzhou Metro.

== See also ==
- Sun Yat-sen Mausoleum in Nanjing
- Sun Yat Sen Nanyang Memorial Hall in Singapore

== Bibliography ==
- Beck, Sanderson (2007), Republican China in Turmoil 1912–1926.
- Pakula, Hannah (2009), The Last Empress: Madame Chiang Kai-shek and the Birth of Modern China, New York: Simon & Schuster, ISBN 9781439154236.
