= Chiayu Tung =

Taiwanese lawyer (born 1995)

Director of KMT International Affairs
- Incumbent
- Assumed office November 6, 2025

Personal details
- Born: 1995 (age 30–31)
- Education: New York University (BA, BA, BS); University of Cambridge (MPhil); Harvard University (JD)

Chiayu Tung (Chinese: 董佳瑜; pinyin: Dǒng Jiāyú; born 1995) is a Taiwanese lawyer who is the director of international affairs of the Kuomintang (KMT).

== Early life and education ==
Tung was born in 1995. She was raised in Shanghai, where her father, a Taiwanese businessman, worked. She graduated from the Shanghai Cambridge International School (上海市实验学校剑桥教育中心), an international high school.

After high school, Tung won a full scholarship to attend New York University, where she graduated with three bachelor's degrees in anthropology, mathematics, and psychology, respectively. She then pursued graduate studies in England, earning a Master of Philosophy (M.Phil.) from the University of Cambridge in international relations, and returned to the U.S. to attend Harvard Law School, where she earned her Juris Doctor (J.D.) degree. She was admitted to the New York State Bar Association in 2025. As of 2026, she teaches part-time as a lecturer at the law school of Chinese Culture University.

== Political career ==
On November 6, 2025, the central committee of the KMT, following the recommendation of Cheng Li-wun, named Tung as the director of the party's international affairs department. In April 2026, Tung was among 14 members selected by Cheng to be a part of her visit to mainland China that year.
