= Lü Yanzhi =

Chinese architect

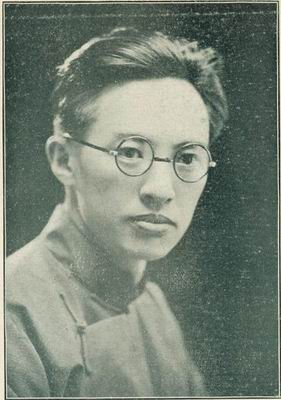
Lü Yanzhi

Lü Yanzhi (Chinese: 呂彥直; pinyin: Lǚ Yànzhí; Wade–Giles: Lü Yen-chih; 1894–1929) was a Chinese architect. He won the competitions to design both the Sun Yat-sen Mausoleum in Nanjing and the Sun Yat-sen Memorial Hall in Guangzhou. Lü died the year that the memorial hall began construction in 1929; it was eventually completed in 1931.

== Background ==
Lü spent part of his childhood in Paris. He earned a degree in architecture from Cornell University in the United States in 1918, and then worked for Murphy & Dana until 1921, when he went into independent practice in Shanghai. Among projects he worked on with the firm are Ginling College in Nanjing and Yenching University in Beijing.

== Career ==
Lü's firm, whose name translates as "C. Lü Architect", was the first Chinese-owned architectural firm. In 1924, with Fan Wenzhou, he co-founded the first Chinese architectural association. Considered one of the most gifted Chinese architects of his generation, Lü won two prestigious national design competitions, for the Sun Yat-sen Mausoleum in September 1925, and for the Sun Yat-sen Memorial Hall the following year. He died of cancer in 1929 and the Memorial Hall commission was completed by Li Jinpei.

In keeping with the competition guidelines but also with the historicising impulse exemplified by Murphy & Dana's collegiate buildings, Lü's designs for both major commissions adapt traditional Chinese design features to modern uses. His writings describe this as a means of asserting Chinese nationhood against foreign imperialism. Liang Sicheng later criticised him for using only superficial aspects of Chinese architecture, which he wrote led to "a series of mistakes in proportions" in the hall in the mausoleum. Other early historians of 20th-century Chinese architecture have also represented him as merely a draftsman, due in part to Henry Murphy describing him as such after he won the contest to design the mausoleum.

== Lü Yanzhi and Huang Tanpu ==
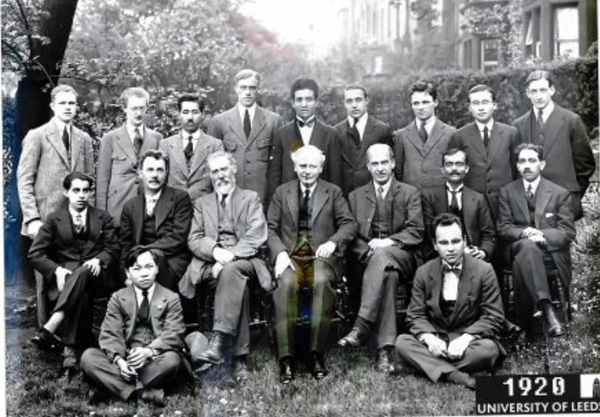
Graduated from the University of Leeds (Huang, the first line left)

Huang Tanpu (also known as T. P. Wong, 27 March 1898 – 20 January 1969) followed his uncle to England by the age of 13.

After graduating from the University of Leeds, he met Lü Yanzhi in Paris's Louvre museum at the beginning of 1921 during the trip back to China and since then they became close friends and partners. In March 1922, they co-founded the "Gen Yue & Co", in which Lü was engaged as architect and Huang undertook the business.

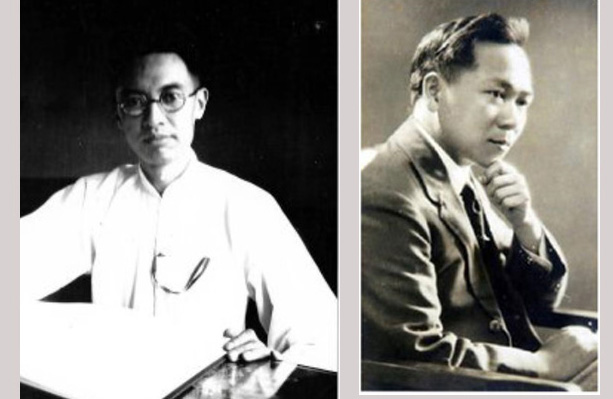
Lü Yanzhi (left) and Huang Tanpu (right)

In September 1925, Lü won the first prize of Sun Yat-sen's Mausoleum Design Awards. The company then announced the establishment of "YanKee Architects". In March 1926, Huang delivered the speech at the groundbreaking ceremony of Nanjing's Sun Yat-sen Mausoleum on the behalf of Lü. Since then he represented Lü for the communication with the media and the government, the organization and the public speeches etc. In November 1926, they signed another architecture's contract on Sun Yat-sen's Guangzhou Memorial Hall. In 1927, Lü was diagnosed with cancer, then asked Huang to be his total representative, to continue on the two great constructions in Nanjing and Guangzhou. From 1929 to 1932, Huang hired Shanghai famous Wang Kai Photography, to photograph the third period of the construction process of Nanjing Sun's Mausoleum and Guangzhou Memorial Hall to record the truth about the construction process of these two great national memorial buildings.

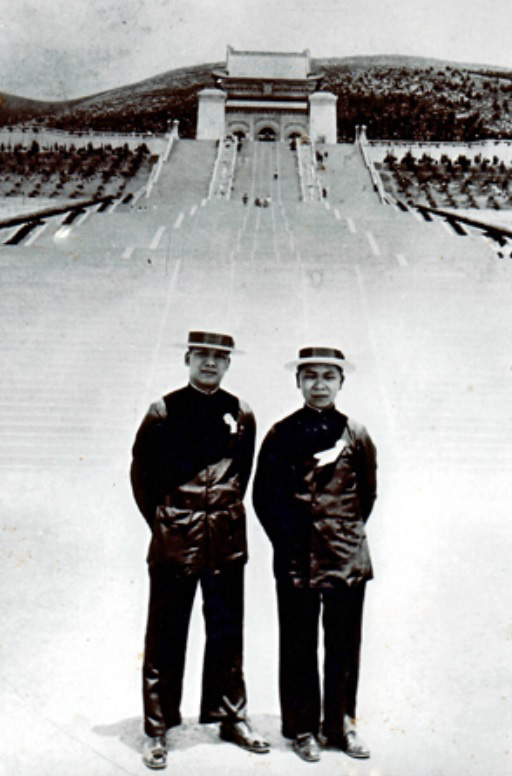
July 1929, Huang (right) and Architect P. G. Lee, in Nanjing Sun Yat-sen's Mausoleum

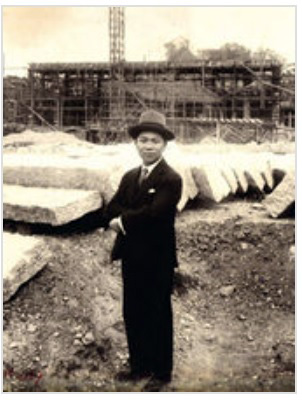
Huang in the construction site of Guangzhou Memorial Hall

After Lü's death, the "YanKee Architects Office" under Gen Yue & Co was renamed as “YanPoy Kee Architects Office” (another famous architect Poy G. Lee was invited to join the Architects Office)

In December 1934, Huang married Huang Zhengqiu, the golden key winner of Yenching University. Her grandfather was Wong Kai Kah (1860–1906), one of the earliest official students sent to United States by Qing China.

In 1935, Huang bought the land and constructed a family residence in Shanghai's Hongqiao Road to serve as a permanent secure collection place for those invaluable architect drawings and documents. In 1944–1945, during the anti-Japanese war, Huang employed some workers to dig the air raid shelters in the garden to place the collections, for ensuring their safety. In May 1949, the People's Liberation Army of the Chinese Communist Party occupied Shanghai. In 1950, one day Huang's family suddenly received the expropriation notice from Shanghai Municipal Military Association, asked for the requisition of the house in order to accommodate the officers of Soviet Air Forces, and the family must be moved out within 72 hours. At that time, Huang was in Hong Kong, and his wife guided the family relations to move away all the architectural drawings, pictures, and Lü's books and materials.

After the Hongqiao house was expropriated, some large wooden cases containing these historical treasures were relocated many times and finally been moved to a small apartment where the family settled down.

In February 1951, Huang was put into prison. His Hongqiao house was confiscated and his company also stopped business. At the end of 1953, was released from prison. In 1956, he donated a great part of collections to the government.

In 1959, one more time, he was sentenced to imprisonment. In order to survive, his wife began to sell parts of the collections, which were discovered later by an old librarian worked in the Shanghai Archives. Some of the collections were finally transferred later to Guangzhou.

On 20 January 1969, Huang passed away. His grave was settled in the neighbor city Suzhou countryside in Jiangsu.

After 2000, this history was gradually recognized.

In 2012, some donation materials, contributed by Huang and his future generations, were exhibited in Nanjing Sun Yat-sen Memorial House.
