= Sun Yat-sen Mausoleum Music Stage =

Sun Yat-sen Mausoleum Amphitheatre
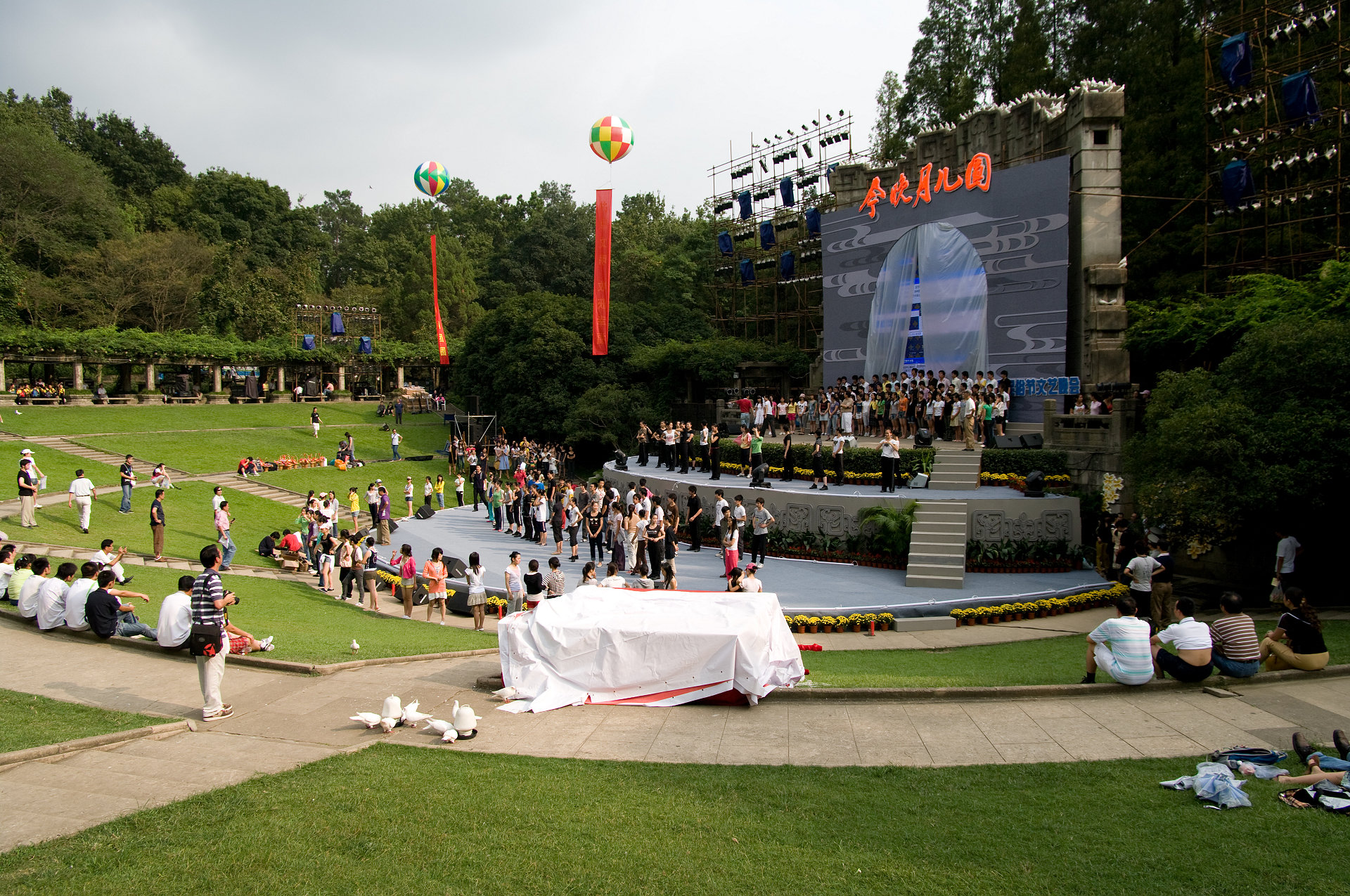

General information
- Type: Amphitheatre
- Location: Nanjing, Jiangsu Province, China
- Coordinates: 32°03′26.07″N 118°51′00.87″E
- Construction started: 1932
- Completed: 1933

Sun Yat-sen Mausoleum Amphitheatre (Chinese: 中山陵音乐台) is a building affiliated to the complex of Sun Yat-sen Mausoleum, located in the southeast of Sun Yat-sen Mausoleum Square in Nanjing, Jiangsu Province, China. Covering an area of more than 4,200 square meters (45,000 sq ft), it is an open-air stage mainly used to hold ceremonies, musical performances and assembly speeches to commemorate Dr. Sun Yat-sen. The stage was designed by Yang Tingbao (Chinese: 杨廷宝) and built by the Liyuan Construction Company (Chinese: 利源营造厂) for 95,000 RMB donated by the San Francisco Chinese-Americans as well as the Liaoning Province, Kuomintang branch. The construction project was started in the fall of 1932 and completed in August, 1933.

== Architectural style ==
The amphitheatre was inspired by both Chinese and Western architectural elements. It uses the ancient Greece architectural details in its natural environment, layout, and facade; and it uses on the details from Classical Gardens of Suzhou on spirit screen musical altar and other buildings. Its layout is a semicircle, whose center is an arc-shaped reinforced concrete stage and a spirit screen. The stage is about 22 meters (72 ft) long, 13.33 meters (43.7 ft) wide and 3.33 meters (10.9 ft) higher above the ground. At the back of the stage there is a concrete spirit screen, which follows the style of the traditional Chinese Mountain Five Screens. Standing on the Sumeru base and facing northward, the spirit screen is about 16.67 meters (54.7 ft) wide, 11.33 meters (37.2 ft) high and in a slightly curved shape. The surface of the screen is veneered with cement Zhanjia stone. The spirit screen not only serves as stage setting, but also reflexes sound waves. The upper part and two sides of the screen are engraved with moire patterns, below which three dragon heads are engraved, protruding from the screen. At the edge of the stage, there are several wave-shaped stairs, which are filled with soils to grow flowers and grass.

There is a crescent-shaped lotus pond of 12.67 meters in radius in front of the stage. The pond is filled with rainwater and runoffs. The pond is designed to attenuate and improve sound qualities. Reinforced concrete pergolas of wisteria is on an elevated platform as wings spirit screen. Below the stage, there are rest rooms, washrooms, storage, and other facilities.

In front of the pond is the auditorium to host 3000 listeners. The auditorium, sloped towards the stage, is about 56.67 meters (185.9 ft) in radius. Three concentric paths equally divide the surrounding auditorium into four bands and five equally-spaced walkways of 2 meters (6 ft 7 in) radiating from the center further divides each band into 6 sections. The walkways has 45 steps—Dr. Sun Yat-sen was 45 when Qing was overthrown.

On the higher side of the semicircular music stage, there is a pergola of wisteria, 6 meters (20 ft) wide and 150 meters (490 ft) long. Inside and outside of the walkways each has 36 stand columns, 36 flowerpots and 30 stone benches. There are rectangular stone benches between flowerpots under each pergola. At the periphery of the pergola there is an arc-shaped moat, with five bridges serving as five passageways of the music stage. The wisteria corridor is spread in a semicircle, forming a rhythm of equidistance and beauty of melody.

== See also ==
- Sun Yat-sen Mausoleum
- Sun Yat-sen
- Kuomintang
- spirit screen
