= Sun Yat-sen Mausoleum =

National monument in Nanjing, China

- 中山陵
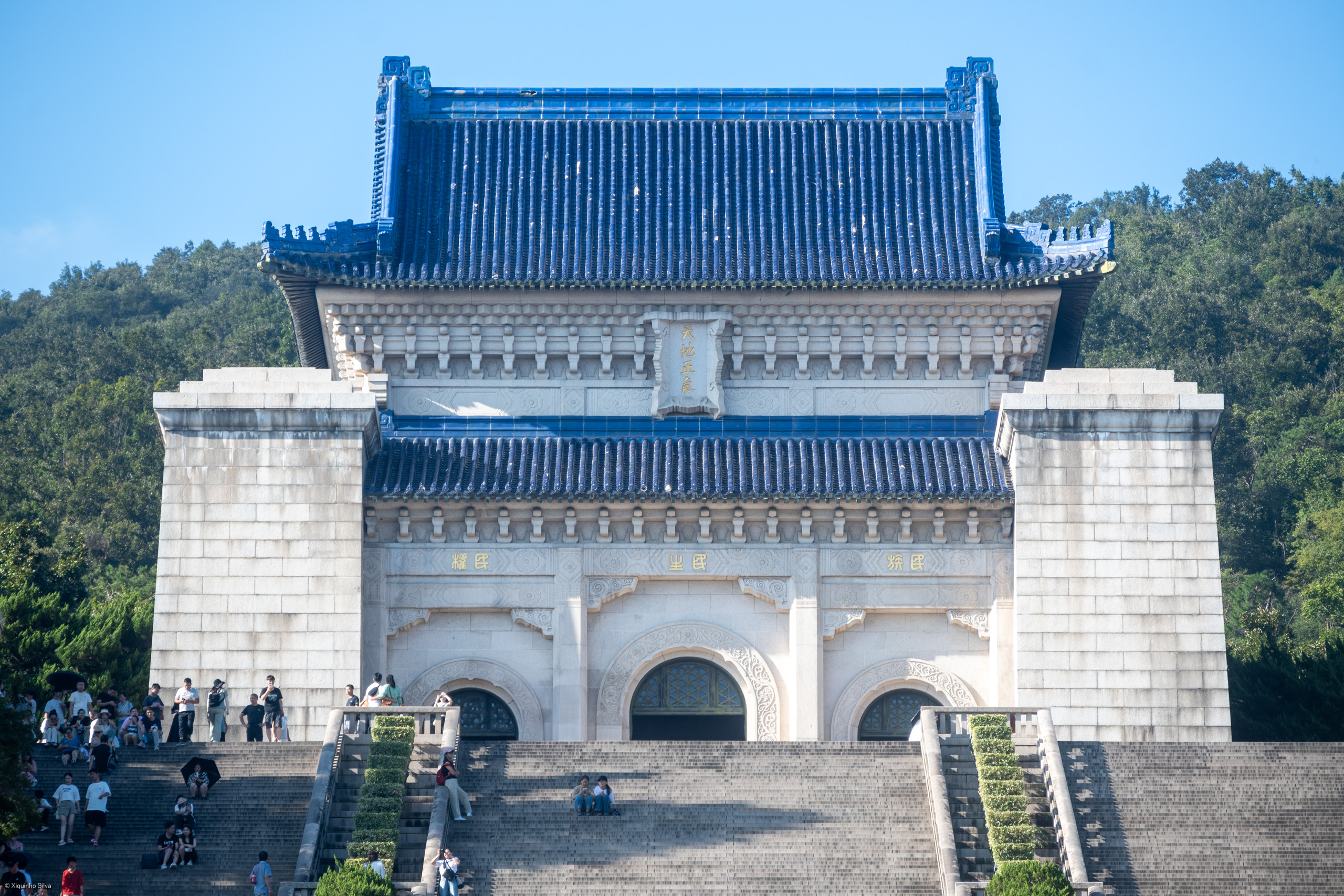
- Sacrifice Hall of the Sun Yat-sen Mausoleum

General information
- Type: Memorial Hall, Mausoleum
- Location: Zijin Shan, Nanjing, China
- Coordinates: 32°03′51″N 118°50′54″E
- Named for: Sun Yat-sen
- Groundbreaking: January 15, 1926
- Completed: January, 1929

Design and construction
- Known for: Final resting place of Sun Yat-sen

Sun Yat-sen Mausoleum
- Chinese: 中山陵
Transcriptions
Standard Mandarin
- Hanyu Pinyin: Zhōngshān Líng
- Bopomofo: ㄓㄨㄥ ㄕㄢ ㄌㄧㄥˊ
- Wade–Giles: Chung^{1}-shan^{1} Ling^{2}
- IPA: [ʈʂʊ́ŋ.ʂán lǐŋ]
Southern Min
- Hokkien POJ: Tiōng-soaⁿ-lêng

The Sun Yat-sen Mausoleum (Chinese: 中山陵; pinyin: Zhōngshān Líng) is situated at the foot of the second peak of Purple Mountain in Nanjing, Jiangsu, China. Construction of the tomb started in January 1926, shortly after Sun Yat-sen's death, and was finished in spring of 1929. The architect was Lü Yanzhi, who died shortly after it was finished. His representative and project partner was his close friend Huang Tanpu.

== History ==
Sun, considered to be the "Father of Modern China" both in mainland China and in Taiwan, fought against the imperial Qing government and, after the 1911 revolution, ended the monarchy and founded the Republic of China.

Sun was born in Guangdong province of China on 12 November 1866, and died of gallbladder cancer in 1925 in Beijing, China. On the day before his death, Sun offered to preserve his body as Lenin did, and to send himself to Nanjing for burial. In accordance with the wishes of Sun, the body was embalmed in the Peking Union Medical College Hospital and then temporarily stored in the Temple of Azure Clouds, Beijing, and then in Nanjing after the completion of the mausoleum.

=== Selection of the design ===
A committee decided to host a design competition in order to collect designs for the Sun Yat-sen Mausoleum. The committee put advertisements in the newspapers on 5 May 1925, inviting architects and designers at home and abroad to send their designs. In exchange for a 10 yuan charge, the committee would provide the designer with 12 pictures of the site. The design would have to adhere to guidelines. It had to be done in a traditional Chinese style that also evoked a modern design with special and memorial substance. Not only should it evoke the Chinese architectural spirit, but also add creativity. Designers were required to insure that the proposed construction costs within 300,000 yuan (the final cost exceeded 3,000,000 Yuan). Over 40 proposals were received. On 20 September 1925, the committee convened in Shanghai, and unanimously selected Lü Yanzhi's proposal.

The mausoleum was designed by Lü Yanzhi and completed by Poy Gum Lee between 1926 and 1929.

=== Burial ===
On 23 April 1929, the Chinese government appointed He Yingqin to be in charge of laying Sun to rest. On 26 May, the coffin departed from Beijing, and on 28 May, it arrived in Nanjing. On 1 June 1929, Sun was buried there.

=== Second Sino-Japanese War ===
During the Battle of Nanking, advancing Japanese troops shelled the staircase leading up to the sacrificial hall, leaving two bullet holes in a bronze tripod on the western steps.

When Wang Jingwei was inaugurated as a head figure for the Japanese puppet government in China on 30 March 1940, Imperial Japanese troops were placed to prevent encroachment towards the Sun Yat-sen Mausoleum. Later, when Wang died in 1944, an elaborate tomb for him was planned next to the Sun Yat-sen Mausoleum; Japan surrendered before its realization and it was destroyed on orders of He Yingqin.

== Architecture ==
Design proposal for the mausoleum submitted by Lü Yanzhi

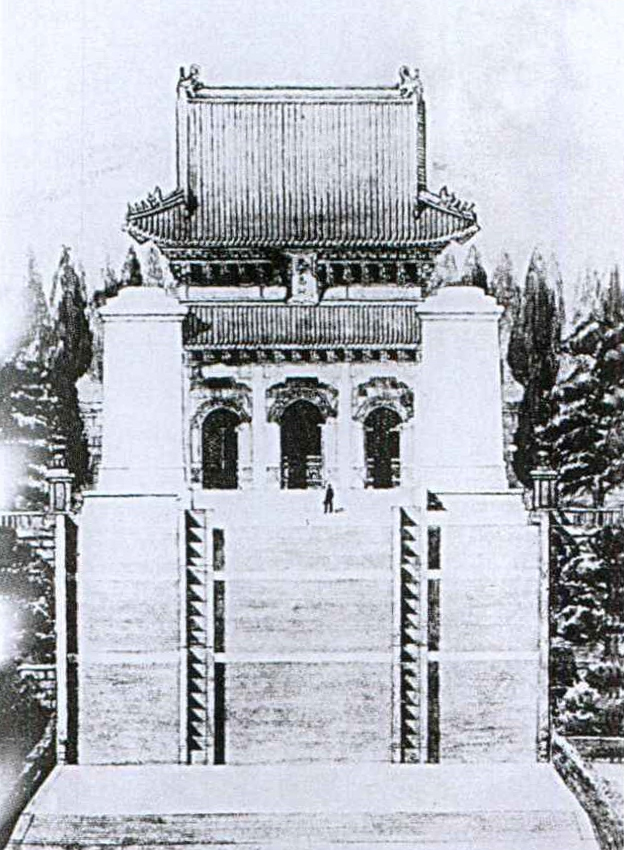
Front view of the sacrificial hall, drawn by Lü Yanzhi

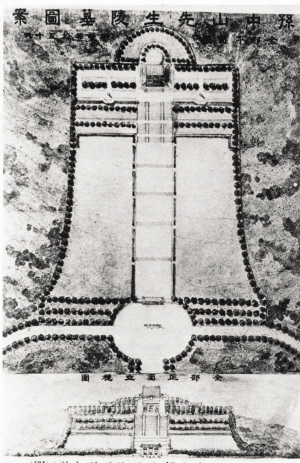
Mausoleum design submitted by Lü Yanzhi in 1925. The floor plan resembles an alarm bell, with the burial chamber as the bell button, and the plaza and memorial archway in front of the mausoleum gate forming the bell hammer. During actual construction, a tomb passage was added outside the mausoleum gate, and the memorial archway was moved outward to the southern end of the passage.

Reclining on a mountain slope, the majestic mausoleum blends the styles of traditional imperial tombs and modern architecture. Lying on the mountainside, the vault is more than 700 meters (2,300 ft) away from the paifang on the square below, which is the entrance of the mausoleum. There is a three-tier stone stand on which a huge bronze ding, an ancient Chinese vessel symbolizing power, perches. To the north of the square, the paifang towers high. Beyond is the 480-meter (1,570 ft) and 50-meter (160 ft)-wide stairway which has 392 stairs leading to the vault. On both sides, pine, cypress, and ginkgo trees guard the way. At the end of the stairway is a gate which is 16 meters (52 ft) high and 27 meters (89 ft) wide. The triarched marble gate is inscribed with the personal motto of Sun, with four Chinese characters written by him, "Tian Xia Wei Gong" ("天下爲公") which means "What is under heaven is for all". Inside the gate, there is a pavilion in which a 9-meter (30 ft) stele is set, which is a memorial monument set by the Kuomintang (KMT). A few stairs up is the sacrificial hall and the vault.

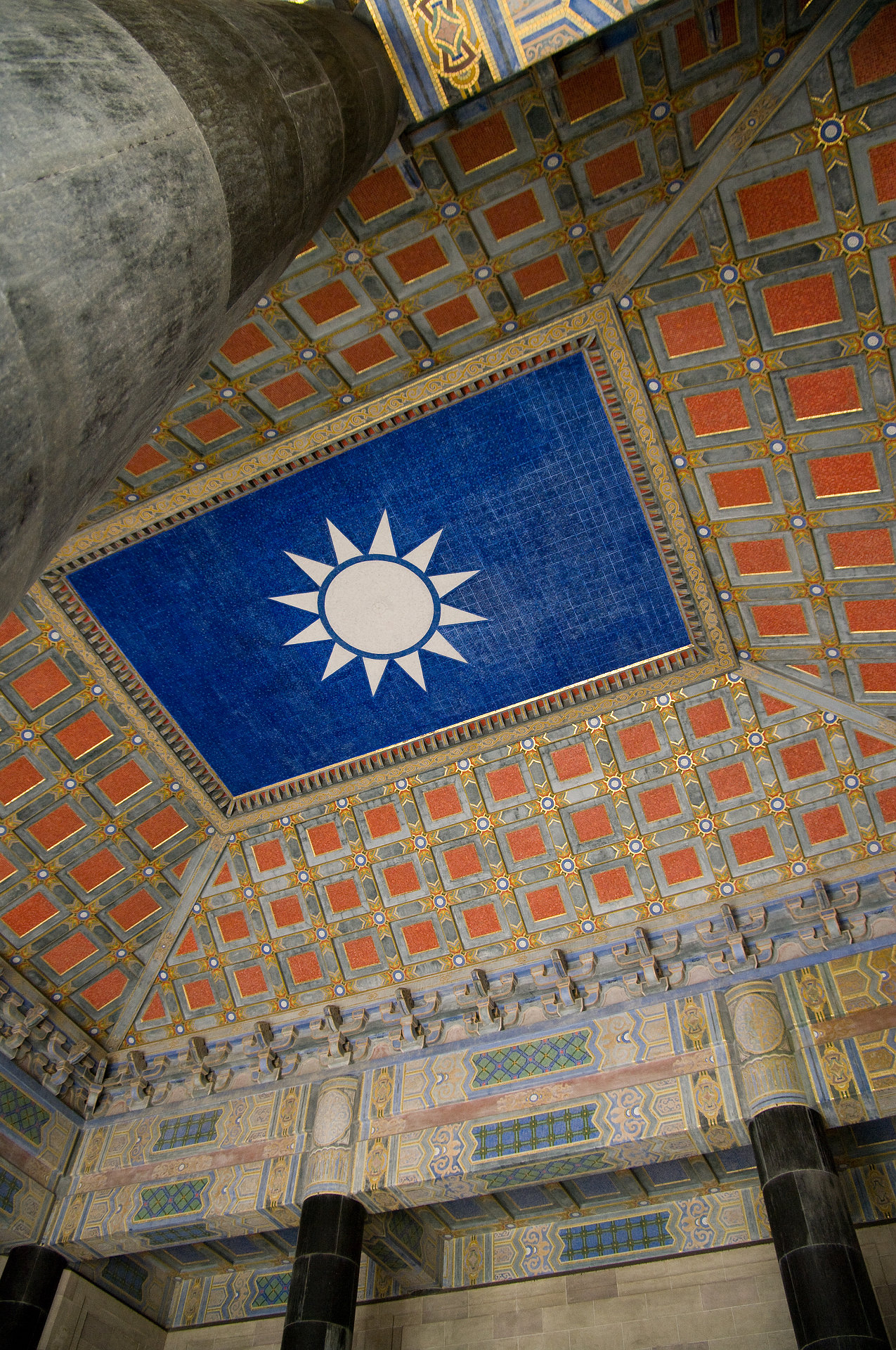
Ceiling of the sacrificial hall, displaying the flag of the Kuomintang

In front of the sacrificial hall there stands a pair of huabiao, ancient Chinese ornamental columns, which are 12.6 meters high. The sacrificial hall is actually a palace of 30 meters (98 ft) in length, 25 meters (82 ft) in width, and 29 meters (95 ft) in height. In the center of the hall a 4.6-meter (15 ft)-high statue of Sun sits. The statue was sculptured out of Italian white marble. The hall's ceiling features the flag of the Kuomintang. Biographical information on Sun is available to visitors in the hall. North of the hall lies the bell-shaped vault, wherein lies the marble false sarcophagus of Sun. Sun's body is interred in a burial chamber 5m below the marble false sarcophagus in a bronze coffin.

Architectural influence of the Mausoleum's design is evident in Taiwan's Chiang Kai-shek Memorial Hall. Sun Yat-sen Mausoleum Scenic Area is located on the north side of Zijin Mountain Road in the Zhongshan Scenic Area at the southern foot of Zijin Mountain in the east of Nanjing City, Jiangsu Province, China.

The core of the Sun Yat-sen Mausoleum Scenic Area is the Sun Yat-sen Mausoleum, located at the southern foot of Zhongmaofeng in Zhongshan Mountain. It is the tomb of the great democratic revolution pioneer Dr. Sun Yat-sen. The mausoleum building of Sun Yat-sen Mausoleum is symmetrical on the central axis. From the archway, tomb passage, mausoleum gate, stele pavilion to the memorial hall and tomb chamber, the horizontal distance is 700 meters, and the height difference is 70 meters. There are 392 stone steps and 10 platforms, all made of white granite and reinforced concrete. Frame, covered with blue glass tiles. It is known as "the first mausoleum in the history of modern Chinese architecture". The total area of the Sun Yat-sen Mausoleum Scenic Area is 3.22 square kilometers, including the Sun Yat-sen Mausoleum and its surrounding music stage, Xiaojing Tripod, Yangzhi Pavilion, Liuhuixie, Xingjianting, Guanghua Pavilion, Sun Yat-sen Memorial Hall, Purple Mountain Adventure Park and other scenic areas Other related attractions.

== High profile visits ==
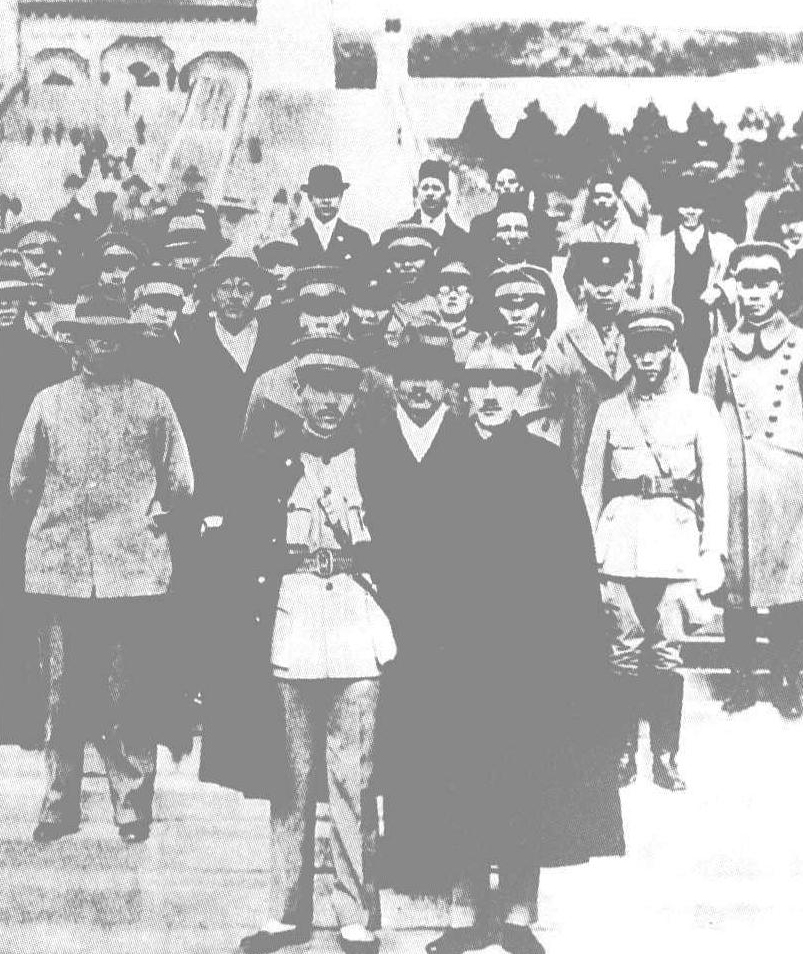
Chiang Kai-shek and Zhang Xueliang at Sun Yat-sen's Mausoleum in the 1930s

In 1929, Republic of China (ROC) President Chiang Kai-shek opened and visited the mausoleum after the Nationalist government's victory in the Northern Expedition. In the summer of 1946, President Chiang Kai-shek made a second visit after the ROC's victory in the Second Sino–Japanese War.

On 27 April 2005, Kuomintang (KMT) Chairman Lien Chan, his wife, and other KMT members visited the mausoleum during their mainland trip. This was the first visit by KMT members since the end of the Chinese Civil War in 1949.

On 15 November 2006, Sun's granddaughter Sun Huiying, who was by then over eighty years old, made a visit to the mausoleum.

On 27 May 2008, KMT Chairman Wu Po-hsiung visited the masuoleum. On 31 May 2009, Wu Po-hsiun made a second visit.

On 12 February 2014, ROC official Wang Yu-chi visited the masuoleum during his mainland trip. This was the first visit by an ROC official in office since the end of the Chinese Civil War in 1949.

On 31 October 2016, KMT Chairwoman Hung Hsiu-chu visited the mausoleum during her mainland trip.

On 28 March 2023, former ROC President Ma Ying-Jeou visited the mausoleum.

On 8 April 2026, KMT Chairwoman Cheng Li-wun visited the masuoleum during her mainland trip.

== Modifications ==
In 1981, Lily Sun, a granddaughter of Sun Yat-sen, visited the mausoleum. The flag of the KMT had been removed from the ceiling at the time of her visit, but was later restored. In May 2011 on another visit, she was surprised to find the four characters "General Rules of Meetings" (會議通則), a document that Sun wrote in reference to Robert's Rules of Order had been removed from a stone carving.

== Gallery ==
=== Architecture ===
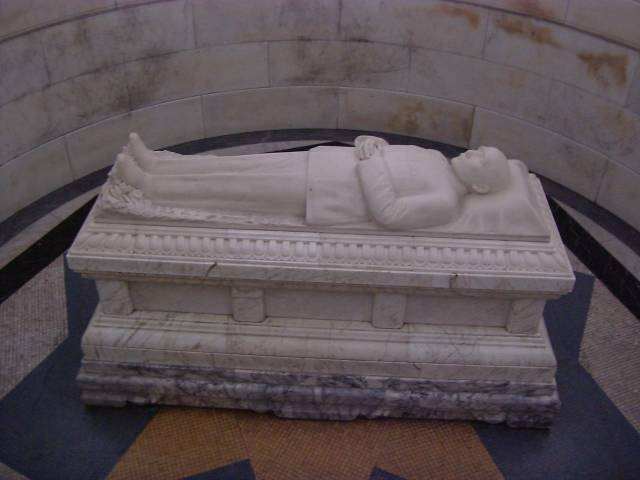
Marble sarcophagus

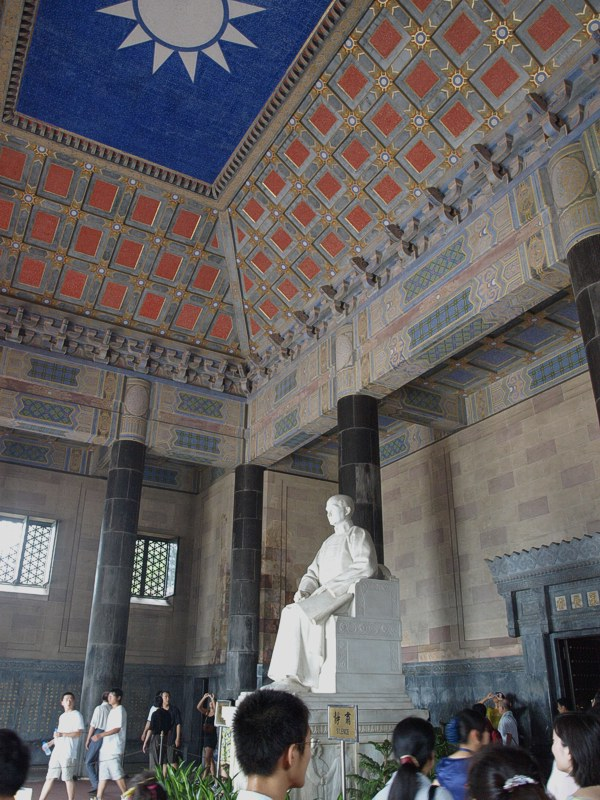
Statue in the Mausoleum, Kuomintang flag on the ceiling

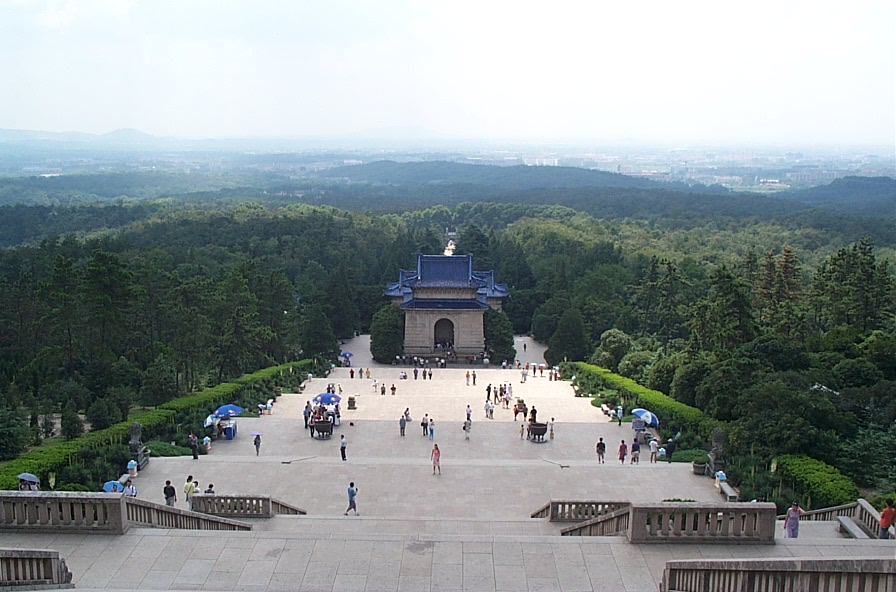
Entrance gate of Sun Yat-sen Mausoleum in Nanjing

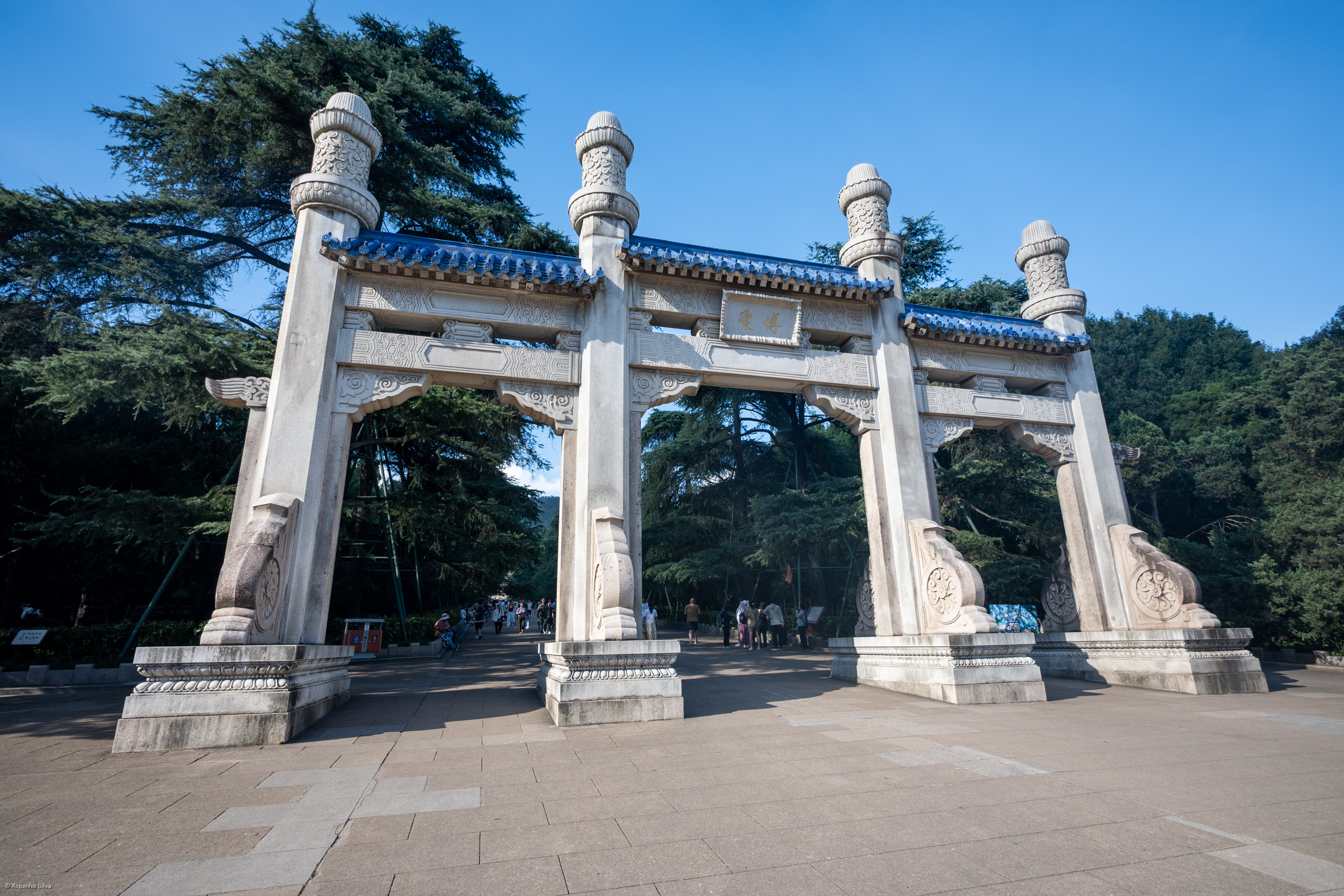
The Entrance Gate

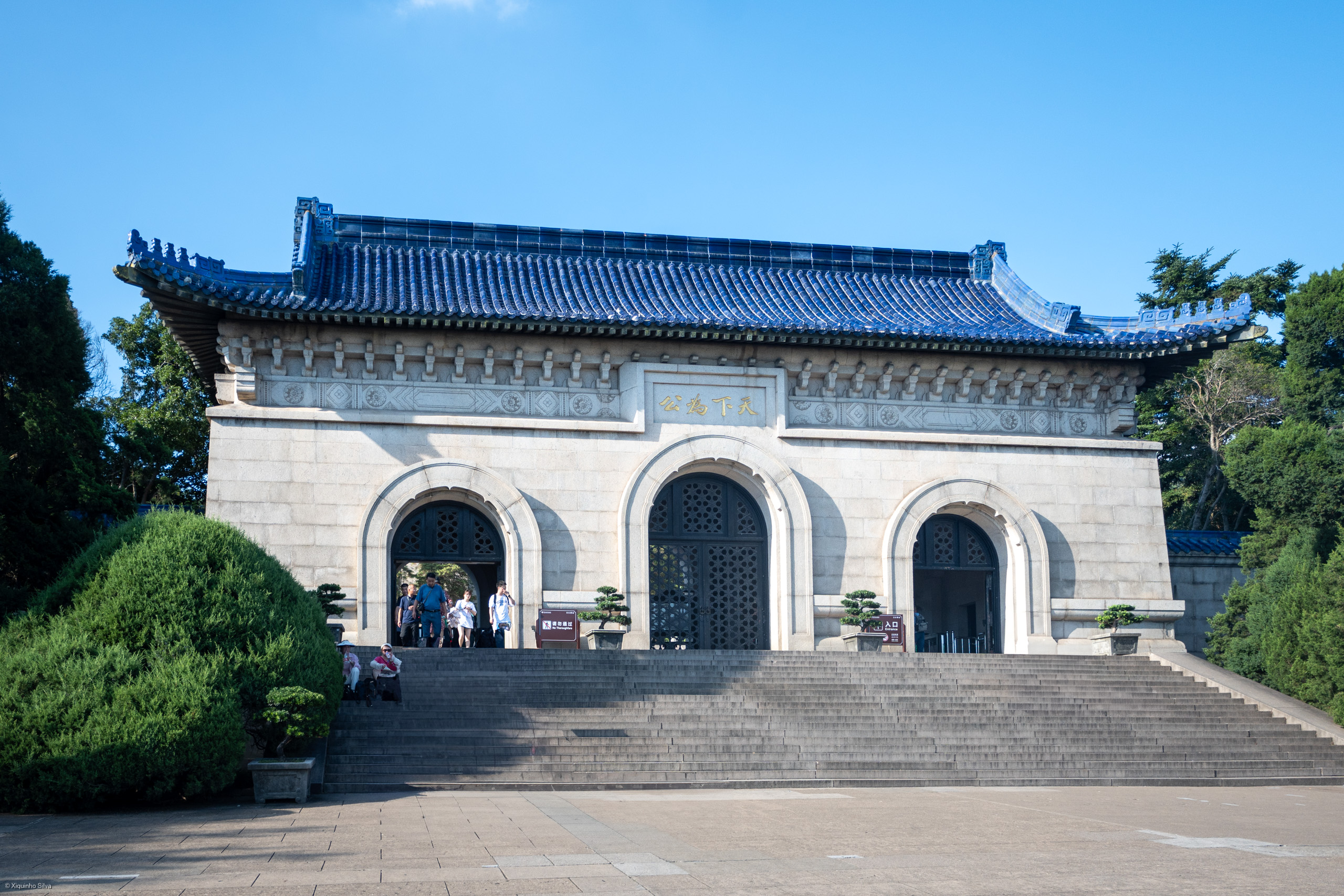
Gate

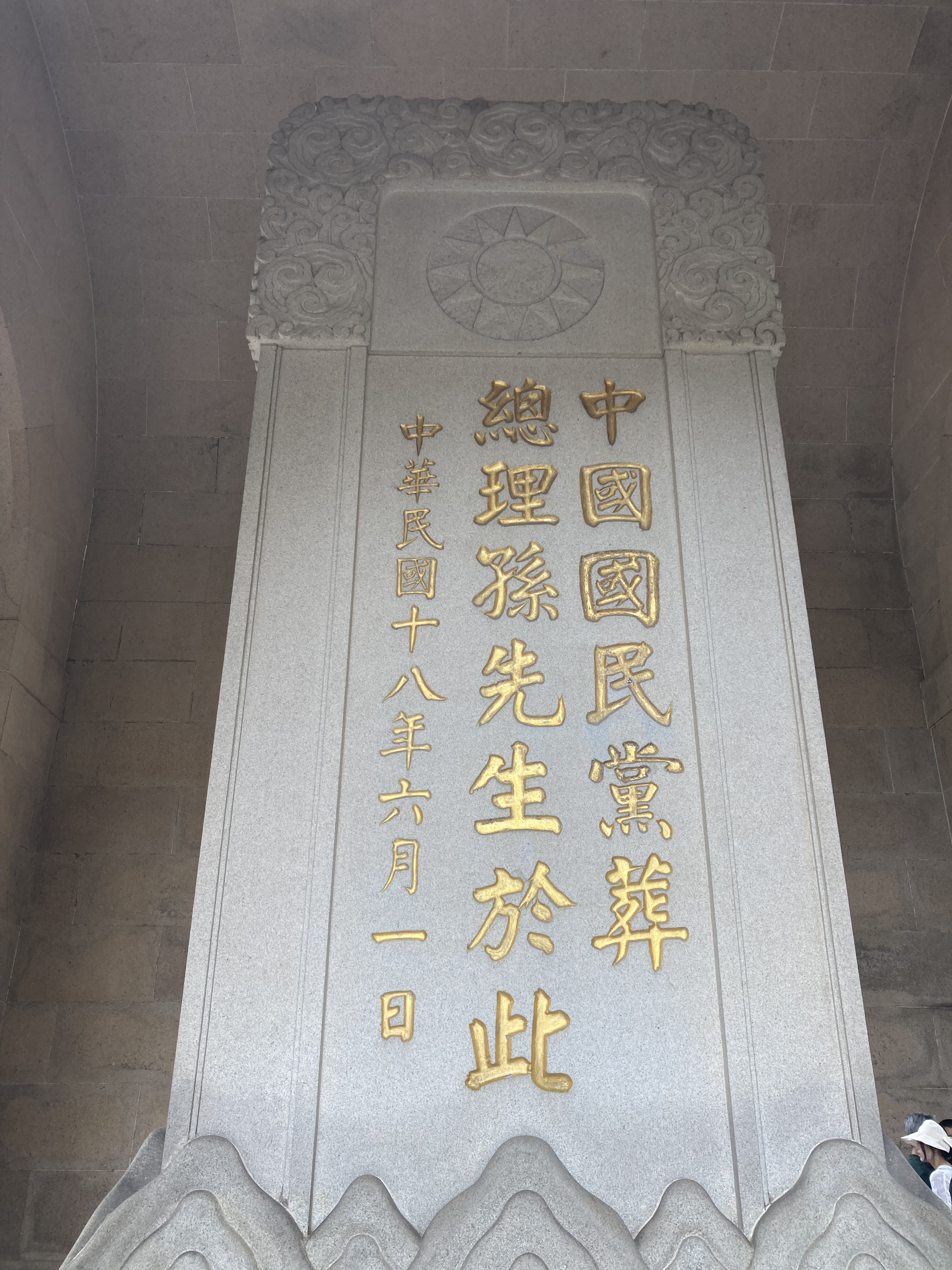
Stele at the gate

=== Historical Events ===
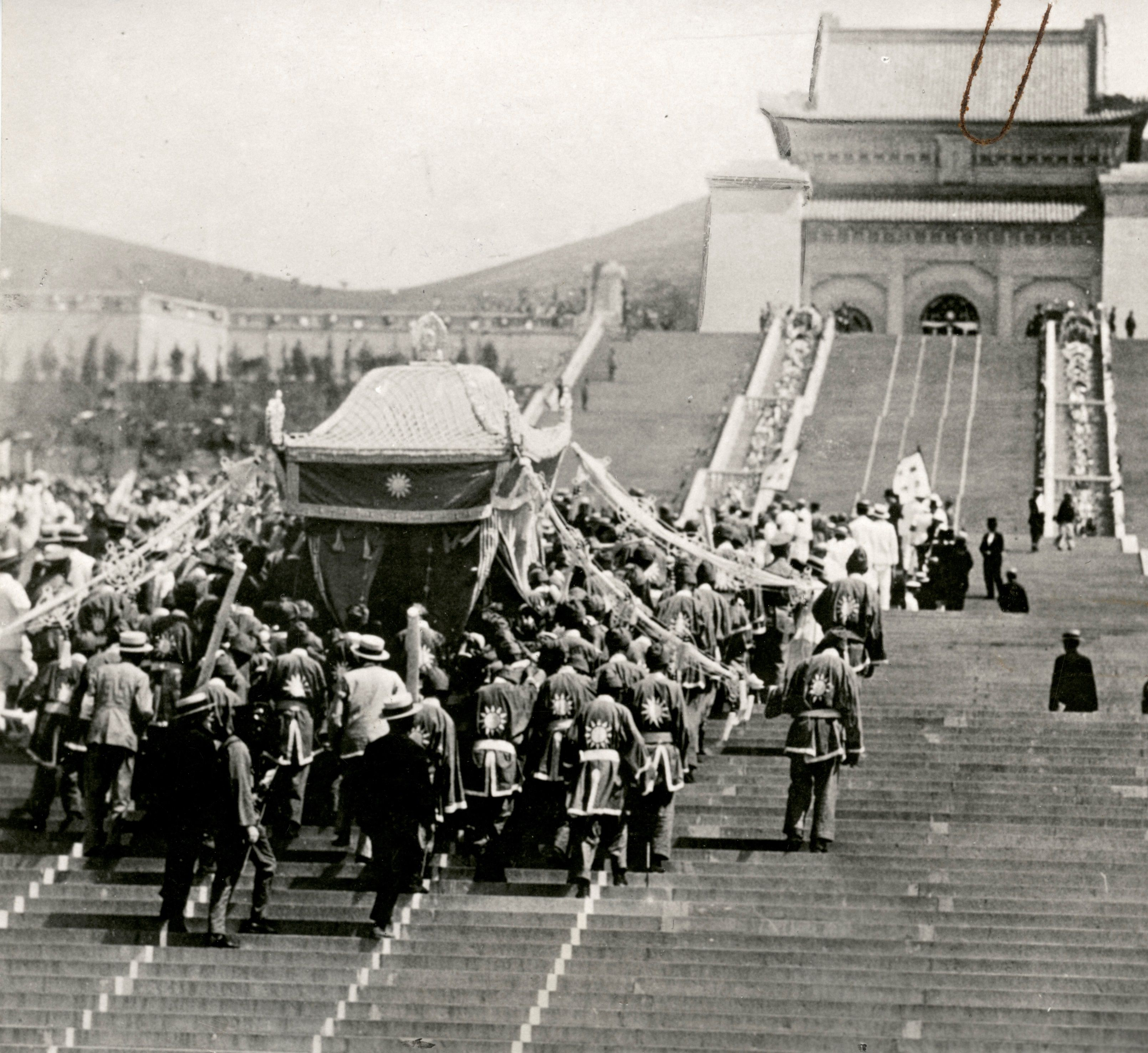
Ceremonies of the interment of Sun Yat-sen in June, 1929

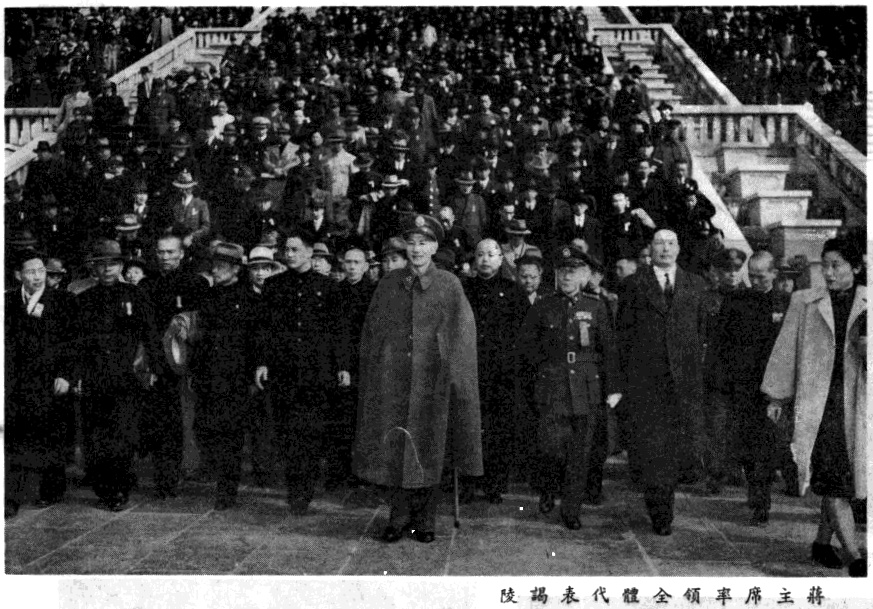
On March 29, 1948, during the first session of the First National Assembly, Chiang Kai-shek led all delegates to pay respects at the mausoleum

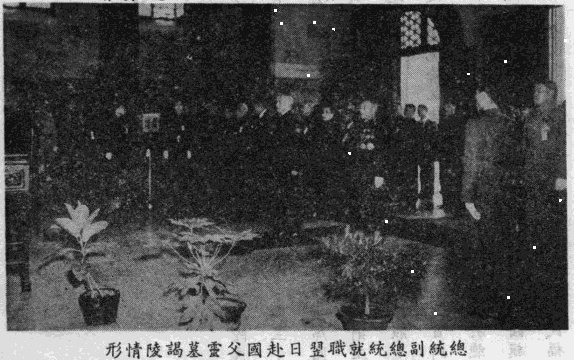
On May 20, 1948, the first President and Vice President of the Republic of China, Chiang Kai-shek and Li Zongren, paid respects at the mausoleum

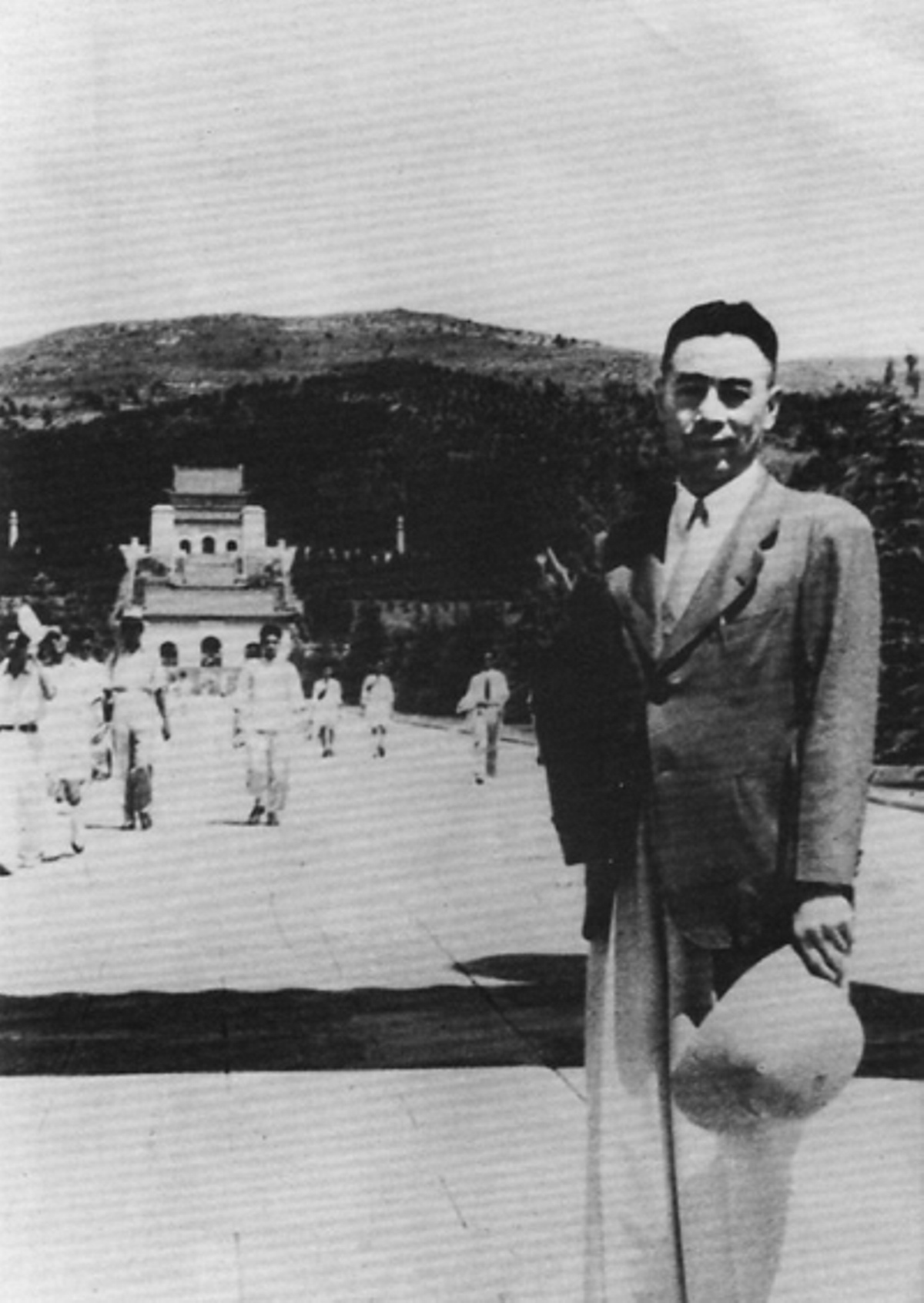
In 1946, Zhou Enlai, Secretary of the Secretariat of the Central Committee of the Chinese Communist Party, paid respects at the mausoleum

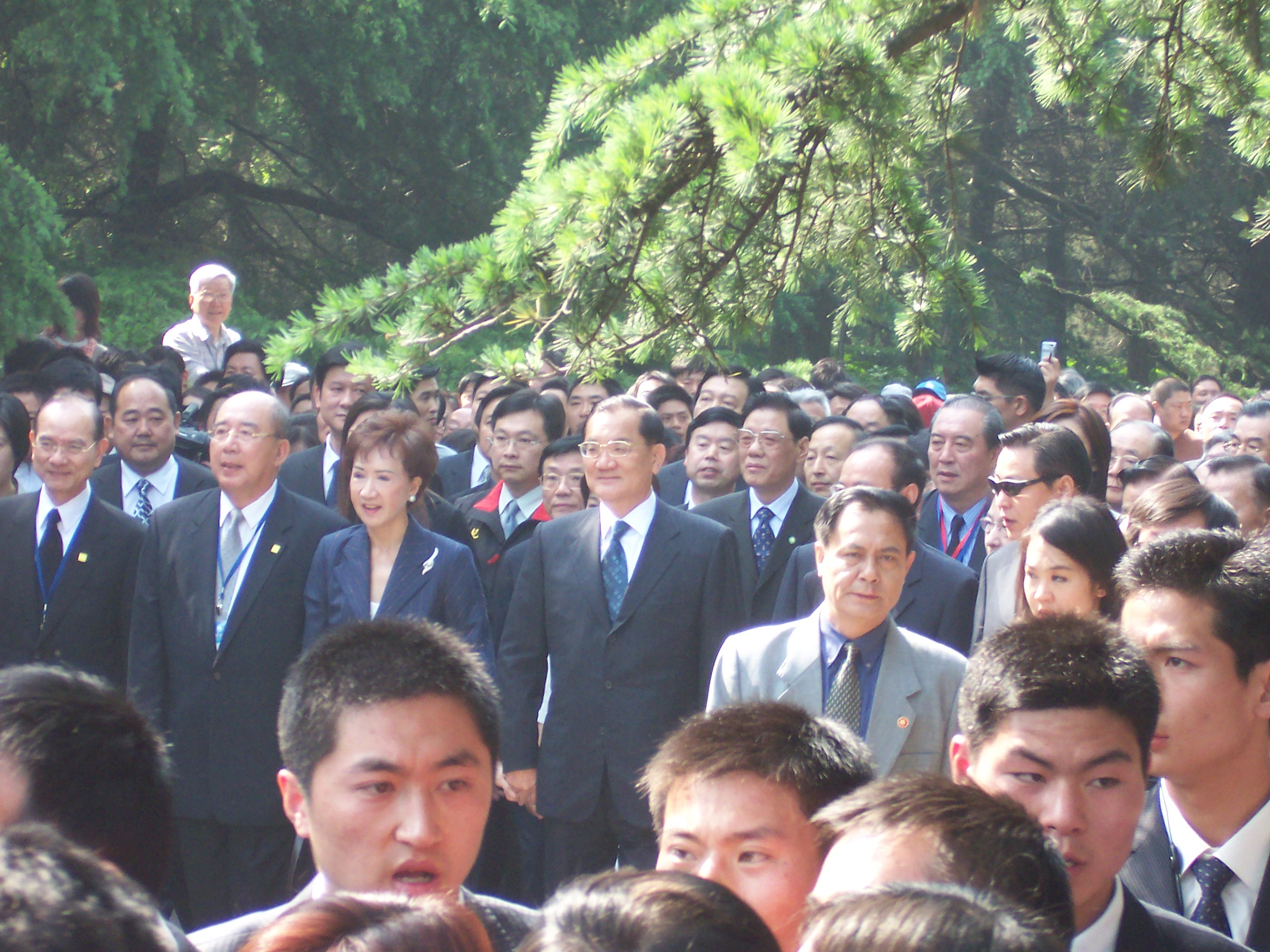
In 2005, Lien Chan, Chairman of the Kuomintang, and his delegation paid respects at the mausoleum during the 2005 Pan-Blue visits to mainland China

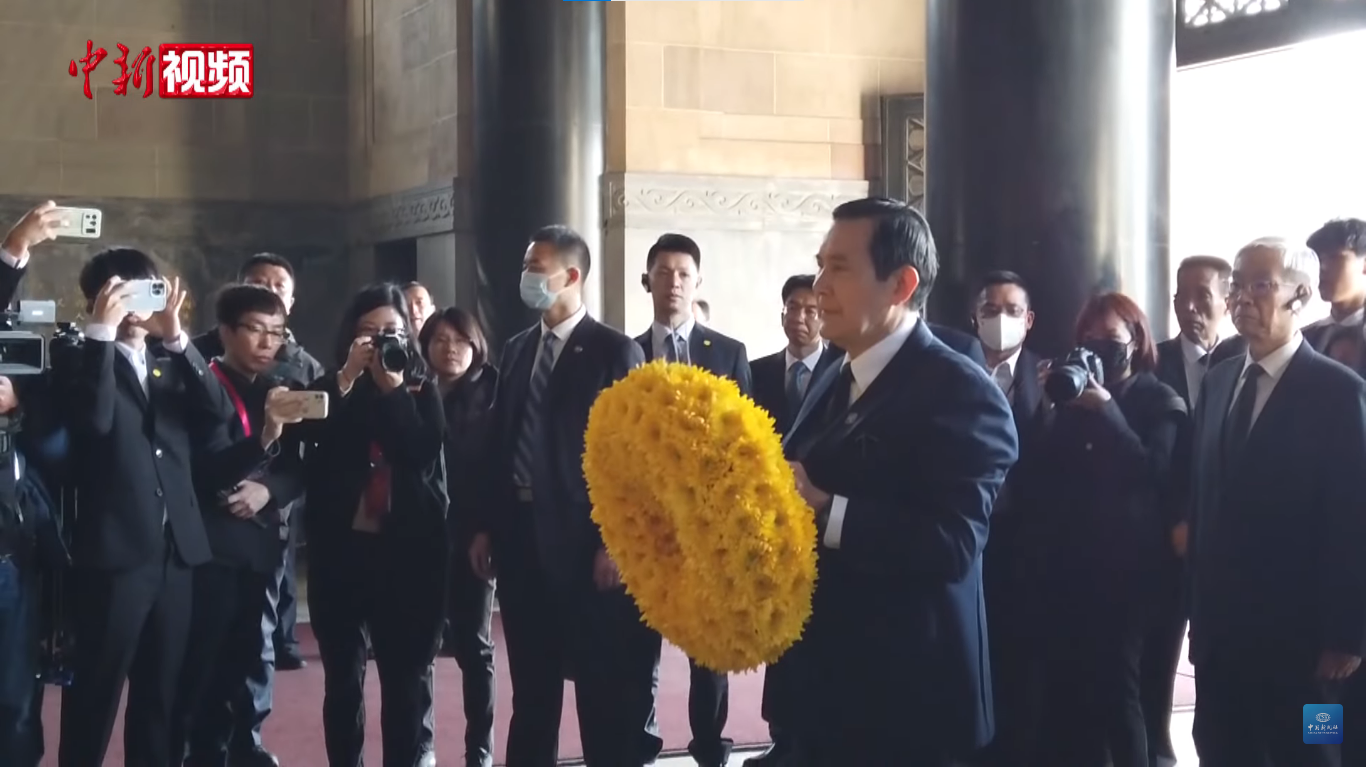
On March 28, 2023, former President of the Republic of China Ma Ying-jeou paid respects at the mausoleum during his visit to mainland China

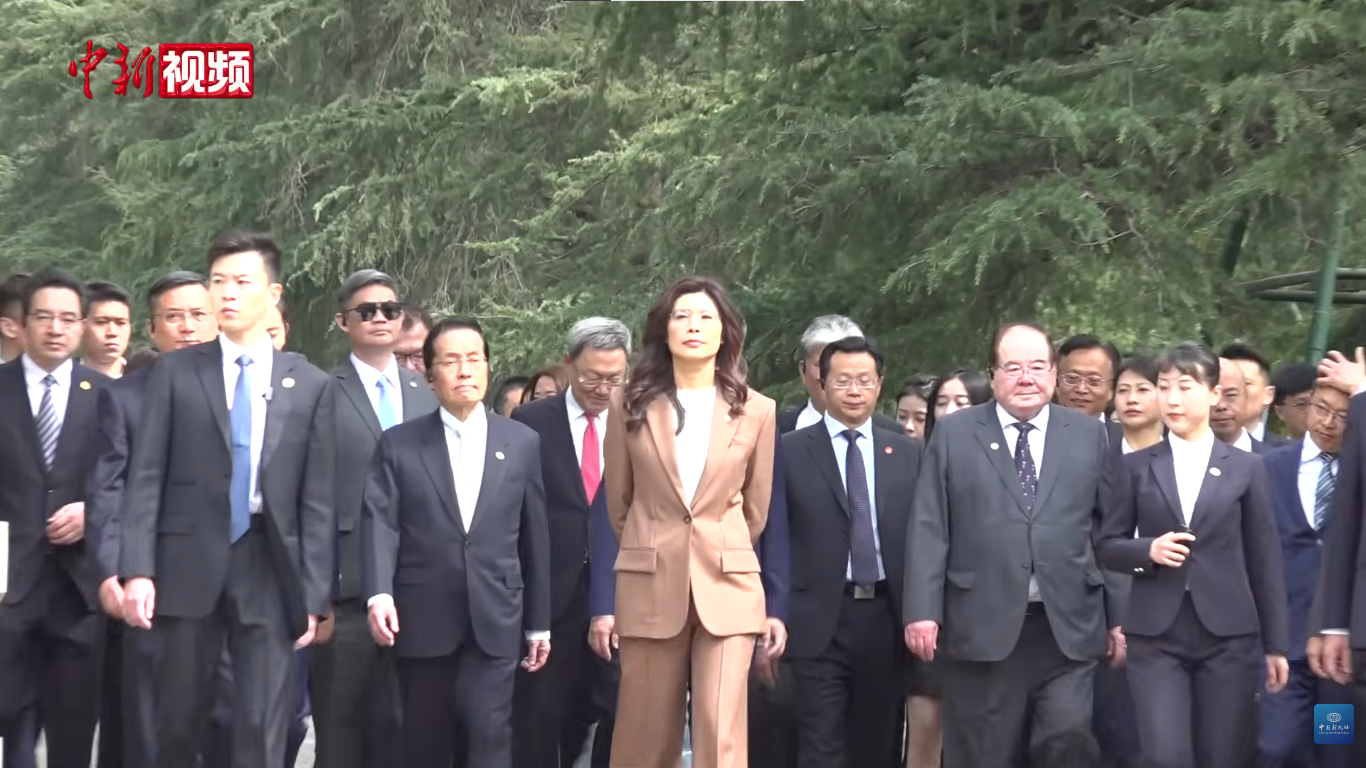
On April 8, 2026, Cheng Li-wun visited the mausoleum to pay respects during her visit to mainland China

== See also ==
- Chiang Kai-shek Memorial Hall
- Cihu Mausoleum
- Ching-kuo Memorial Hall
- Touliao Mausoleum
- Linggu Temple and Tomb of Tan Yankai
- Plum Blossom Mountain in Nanjing (Former Tomb of Wang Jingwei, demolished in 1946)
- Tomb of Hu Hanmin at Longyandong, Guangzhou
- Wu Zhihui Memorial park in Kinmen
- Yangmingshan No.1 Public Cemetery, Beitou District, Taipei
- Sun Yat Sen Nanyang Memorial Hall
- Sun Yat-sen Memorial Hall
- Sun Yat Sen Memorial House
- Sun Yat-sen Museum Penang
- Sun Yat Sen Memorial Park
- Sun Yat-sen Mausoleum Music Stage, Music stage located near the mausoleum.
