= 2016 Xi–Hung meeting =

Cross-strait meeting between Xi Jinping and Hung Hsiu-chu

On November 1, 2016, General Secretary of the Chinese Communist Party Xi Jinping and Kuomintang (KMT) Chairwoman Hung Hsiu-chu met in Beijing.

== Meeting ==
Before the meeting, only a brief video of Hung Hsiu-chu and Xi Jinping meeting and shaking hands, along with a three-minute speech, was shown, before the meeting proceeded into a closed-door discussion. Both the Kuomintang and the Chinese Communist Party announced they opposed the Democratic Progressive Party's pro-Taiwan independence platform. Leaders of both the Kuomintang and the Chinese Communist Party stated that they firmly oppose "Taiwan independence".

== Reactions ==
Former Kuomintang Chairman and New Taipei City Mayor Eric Chu said: The basic position that the Central Party Headquarters and all sectors firmly believe is the "1992 Consensus". He believes that Hung Hsiu-chu will express her firm position based on the KMT's future development and the current consensus within the party.

The Chinese Communist Party highly praised the high-level interaction between the KMT and the CCP. The "Hung-Xi meeting" may break with convention. The meeting will be open throughout, which will be a KMT-CCP exchange and a pioneering event for the CCP leader to meet with Taiwanese politicians. Continuing to maintain high-level interaction between the two parties and consolidating the common political foundation is of great positive significance for maintaining the peaceful development of cross-strait relations and the peace and stability of the Taiwan Strait, and for safeguarding the interests and well-being of compatriots on both sides of the strait.

The DPP caucus in the Legislative Yuan warned Hung Hsiu-chu before the meeting that she should not sign any agreements with the mainland, otherwise she would be dealt with according to law after returning to Taiwan.
