= 2026 visit by Cheng Li-wun to mainland China =

Cross-strait meeting between Xi Jinping and Cheng Li-wun

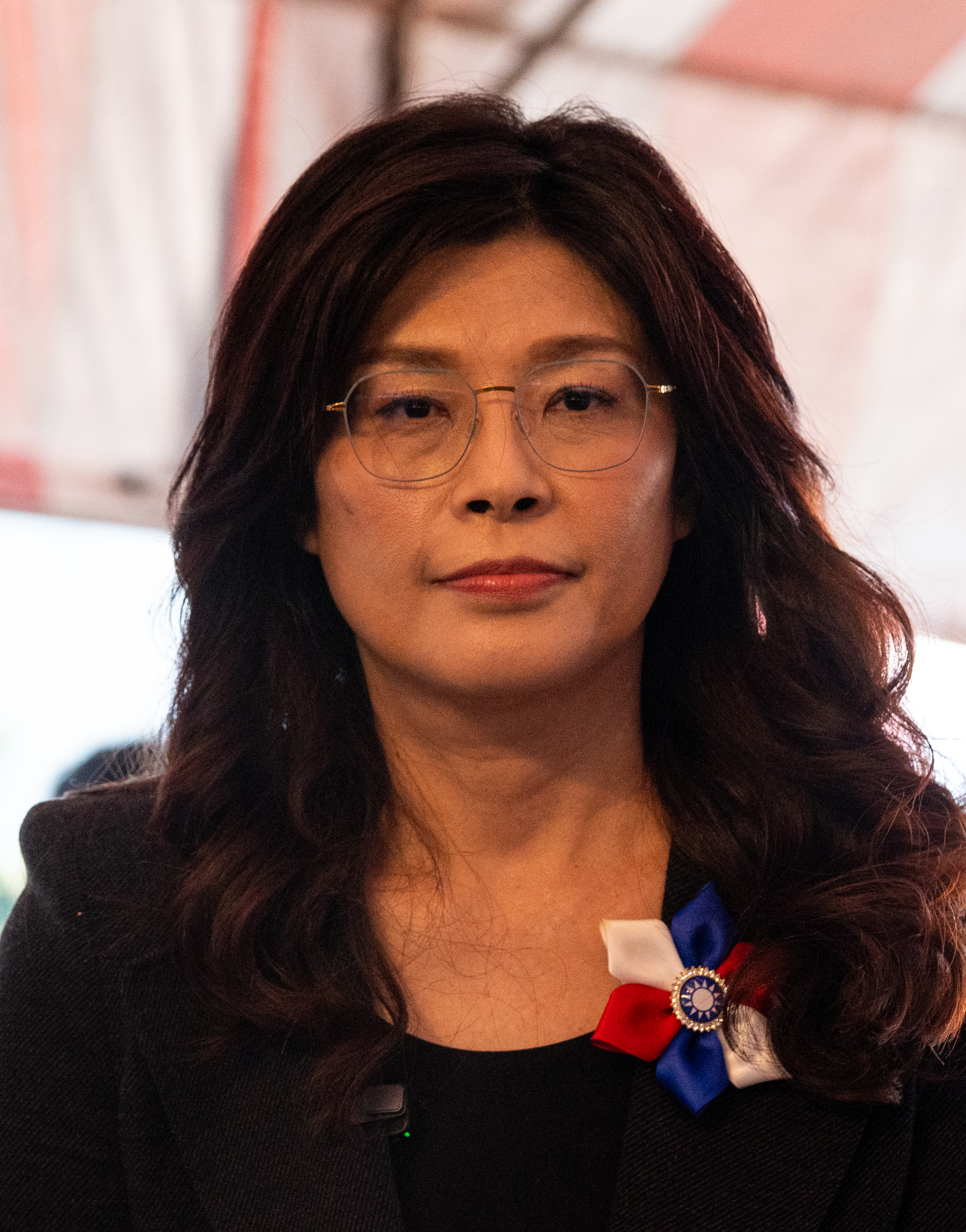
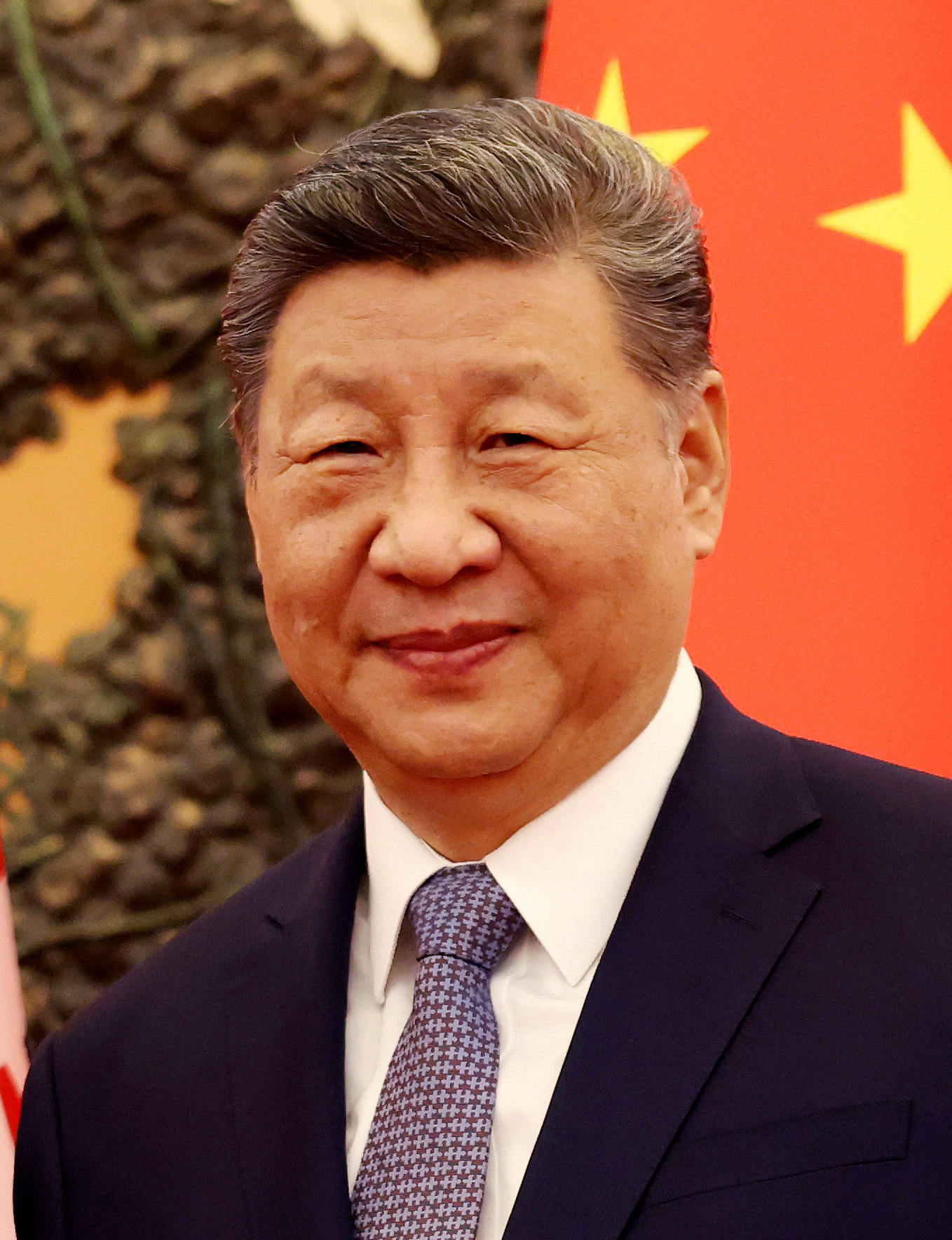
Cheng Li-wun, the chairwoman of Kuomintang (left), and Xi Jinping, the general secretary of the Chinese Communist Party (right)

Kuomintang chairwoman Cheng Li-wun visited mainland China from 7 to 12 April 2026 at the invitation of the Chinese Communist Party (CCP). During her visit, she visited Nanjing, Shanghai and Beijing. She met with CCP general secretary Xi Jinping at the Great Hall of the People in Beijing on 10 April 2026. This meeting between the leaders of the Kuomintang and the CCP was the first in nearly ten years since Hung Hsiu-chu met with Xi in 2016.

== Timeline ==
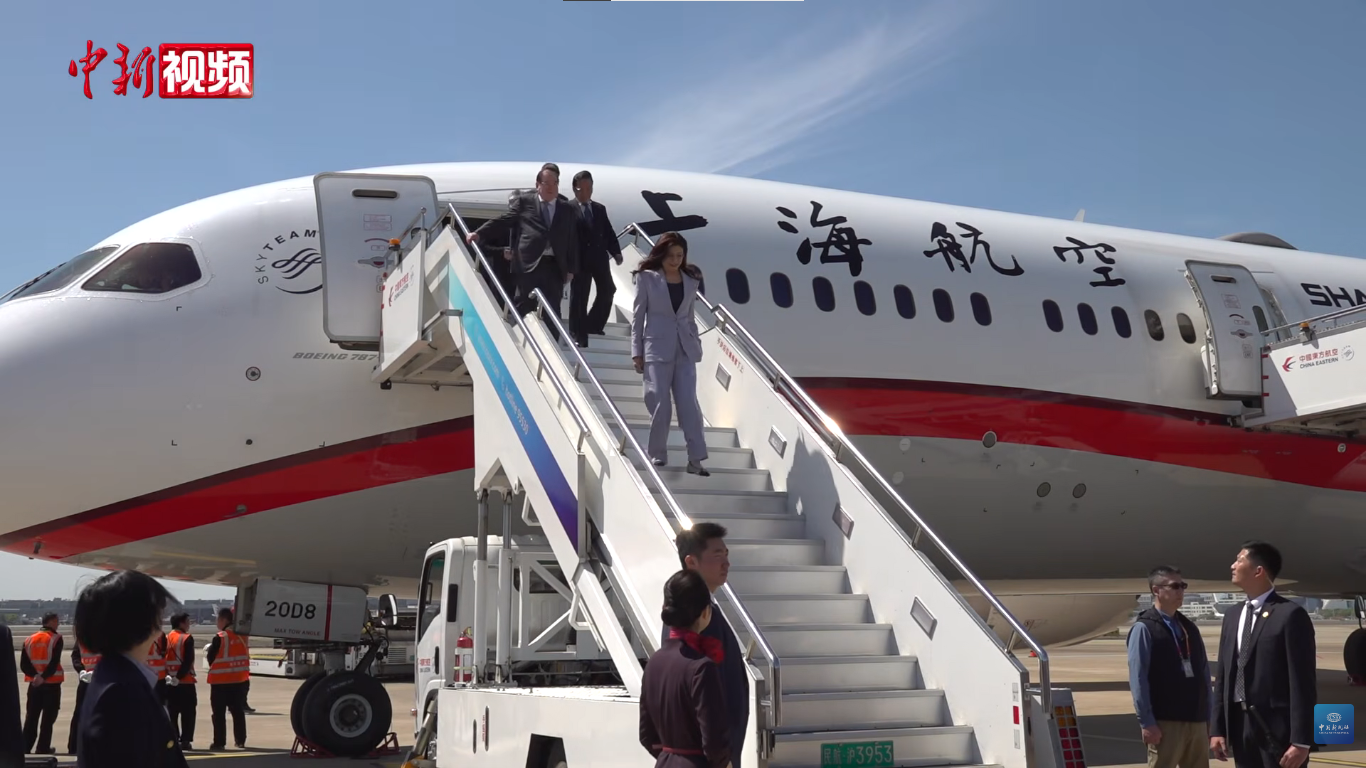
Cheng Li-wun's Shanghai Airlines flight FM852 arriving at Shanghai Hongqiao Airport at 1:35 PM on 7 April

=== Preparation ===
After being elected as the chairperson of the Kuomintang in 2025, Cheng Li-wun said she hoped to meet with Xi Jinping to build goodwill and reduce differences. On 30 March 2026, Xi Jinping formally invited Cheng to lead a delegation to visit the mainland, which Cheng accepted.

The trip cost NT$4.8 million and was fully subsidized by the Taiwan Foundation for Democracy in accordance with the "Guidelines for the Operation of Political Party Subsidy Programs". The Foundation stated that the Kuomintang claimed that the trip was to "promote Taiwan's ideals of freedom and democracy to mainland China".

== Itinerary ==
=== 7 April ===
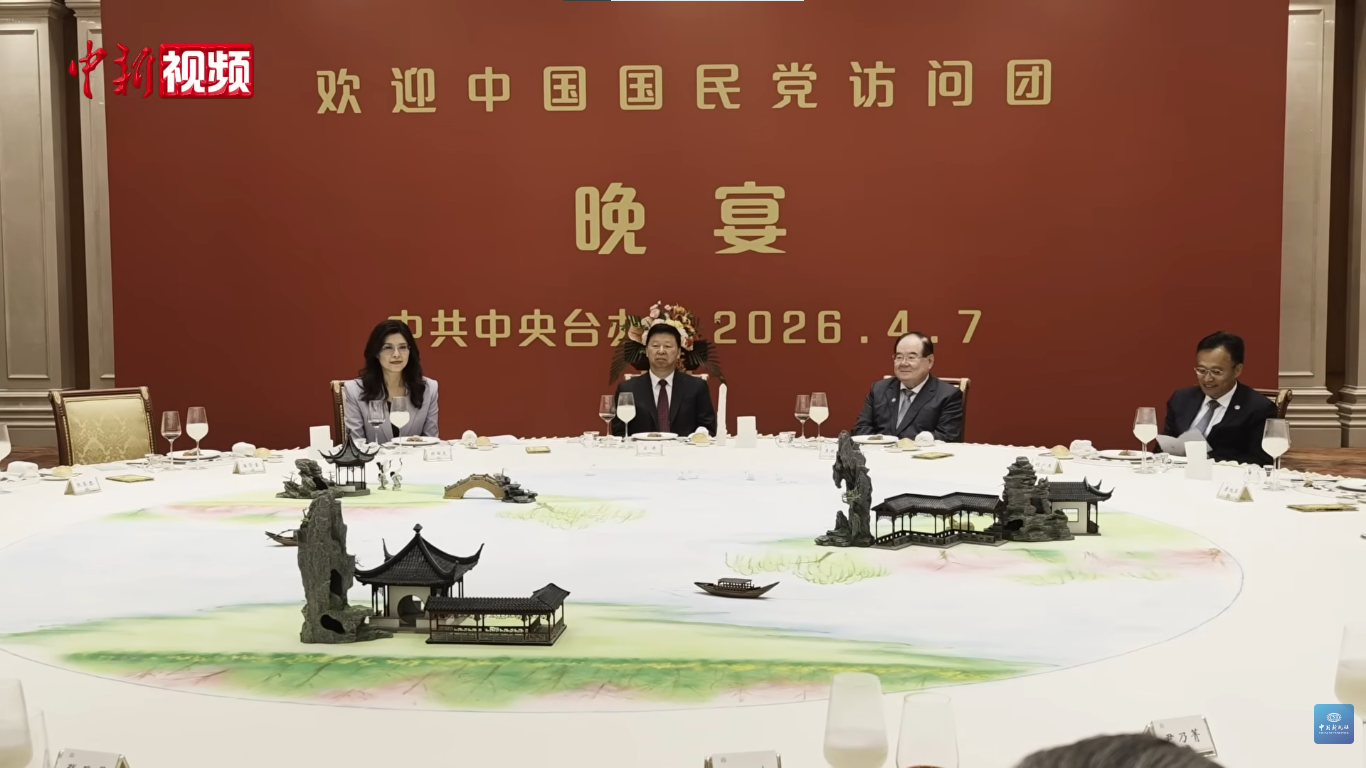
On 7 April, Cheng Li-wun attended a welcome banquet at the Nanjing East Suburb State Guesthouse.

On 7 April 2026, Cheng Li-wun took Shanghai Airlines flight FM852 from Taipei Songshan Airport and arrived at Shanghai Hongqiao International Airport at 1:35 pm. Song Tao, director of the Taiwan Affairs Office, was in charge of picking her up. After arriving in Shanghai, she took the high-speed rail to Nanjing.

=== 8 April ===
On the morning of April 8, Cheng Li-wun visited Sun Yat-sen Mausoleum in Nanjing. In the opening of her memorial address, she mentioned "115 years of the Republic of China". In her subsequent public remarks, she mentioned "Republic of China" and the 1992 Consensus.

At noon, Cheng Li-wun met with Xin Changxing, the Party Secretary of Jiangsu, at the Jinling Hotel in Nanjing. Xin Changxing said that there is a lot of cooperation between Jiangsu and Taiwan, describing it as " a vivid portrayal of the close ties between the two sides of the Taiwan Strait"; Cheng Li-wun also said that Jiangsu is "the most brilliant and exquisite representative of Chinese civilization and culture". After finishing their trip in Nanjing, Cheng Li-wun and her entourage took the high-speed rail to Shanghai.

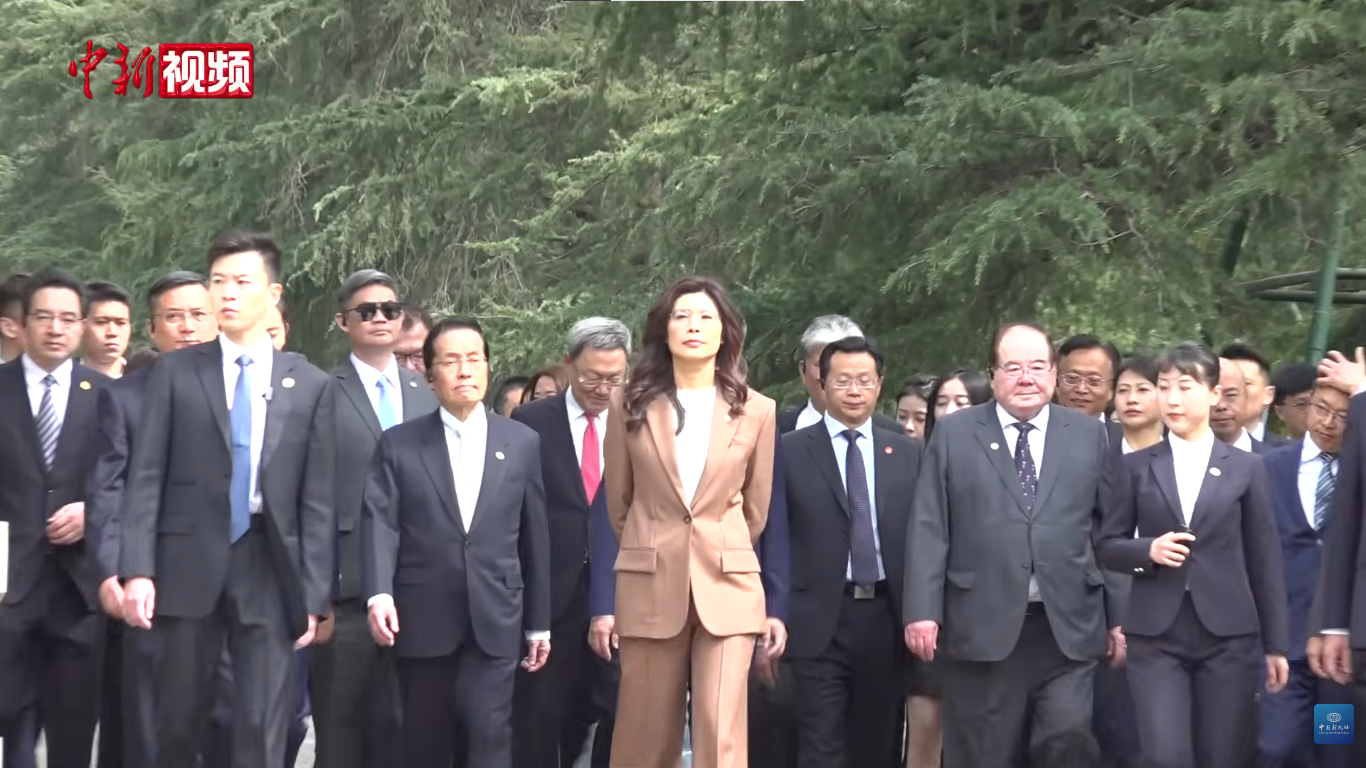
On 8 April, Cheng Li-wun visited the Sun Yat-sen Mausoleum in Nanjing to pay her respects to Sun Yat-sen.

In the afternoon, Cheng Li-wun and her group visited the Shanghai headquarters of Meituan in Yangpu District. Afterwards, Cheng Li-wun experienced drone delivery, and Meituan staff also gave Cheng Li-wun a commemorative doll in the shape of a kangaroo. Cheng Li-wun said with a smile, "I must bring the doll back to Taiwan, and I also want to bring Meituan back to Taiwan." She also pointed out that the low-altitude economy is the future trend and "is a very good experience for Taiwan." In the evening, the delegation came to Yangpu Riverside and then visited the local reading salon, met Ma Boyong and Fan Deng, and then learned about the situation of the Taiwanese youths on site through Fan Deng's introduction.

In the evening, Cheng Li-wun met with Chen Jining, a member of the Politburo of the Chinese Communist Party and the Party Secretary of Shanghai. Afterwards, accompanied by Song Tao, Cheng Li-wun took the Shanghai Star for a night cruise on the Huangpu River.

=== 9 April ===
On the morning of April 9, Cheng Li-wun and her delegation visited Yangshan Port. Afterwards, she gave a speech, saying that "the gift I hope to bring to my relatives and friends in Taiwan is peace" and that "the birds that fly in the sky should be birds, not missiles; the fish that swim in the sea should be fish, not warships". Afterwards, Cheng Li-wun and her delegation visited Comac and visited the C909, C919 and C929 prototypes in turn. Comac Chairman He Dongfeng, who accompanied them, said that "he hopes that the C919 can fly to Taiwan" and presented Cheng Li-wun with an airplane model.

At noon, Cheng Li-wun met with nearly 300 Taiwanese business representatives at the Pudong East Suburb Hotel in Shanghai. At the meeting, she said that "only peace can bring prosperity to Taiwan." In the afternoon, Cheng Li-wun and her delegation concluded their visit to Shanghai and went to Beijing.

=== 10 April ===
At 11:00 a.m. on 10 April, Cheng Li-wun met with Xi Jinping, the general secretary of the Chinese Communist Party, in the East Hall of the Great Hall of the People in Beijing. Xi was accompanied by the chairman of the National Committee of the Chinese People's Political Consultative Conference Wang Huning, the director of the CCP General Office Cai Qi, the director of the Taiwan Affairs Office Song Tao and chairman of the National Development and Reform Commission Zheng Shanjie. Xi told Cheng that "Compatriots on both sides of the Taiwan Strait belong to the Chinese nation" and said cross-strait relations should be "firmly in the hands of the Chinese people". Cheng praised Xi's leadership, saying he enabled China to achieve complete poverty eradication and building a "moderately prosperous society." She proposed that Taiwan and mainland China work together on preserving Chinese history and promoting Chinese culture, enhancing common well-being and promoting exchange and cooperation and ensuring better cross-strait relationship and enhancing people's well-being. She also spoke of her hope of one day hosting Xi in Taiwan. At noon, Xi hosted a banquet for Cheng Li-wun and her delegation.

In the afternoon, Cheng Li-wun held a press conference with Chinese and foreign journalists at the China World Hotel in Beijing, where she introduced the meeting and answered reporters' questions. Cheng Li-wun and her delegation also visited the Tsinghua University High School to learn about the achievements in artificial intelligence education.

=== 11 April ===
On the morning of 11 April, Cheng Li-wun visited the Biyun Temple in Xiangshan, Beijing, and bowed three times to the cenotaph of Sun Yat-sen. She also saw a white pine tree planted by Lien Chan, then chairman of the Kuomintang, in 2006. Afterwards, she visited the Zhongguancun National Independent Innovation Demonstration Zone Exhibition Center.

At noon, Cheng Li-wun met with Yin Li, a member of the CCP Politburo and the Party Secretary of Beijing, at the Beijing Hotel. She mentioned that there are three areas where exchanges with Beijing should be strengthened, including exchanges of archives and cultural relics between the two parties on the Second Sino-Japanese War, the retrocession of Taiwan and party history, cultural and tourism exchanges between the two sides, and cooperation and exchanges on science and technology industries and urban governance experience. She also pointed out that after the Kuomintang achieves a change of ruling party, the exchanges between the Palace Museums of the two sides will be restored.

In the afternoon, Cheng Li-wun and her entourage visited the Palace Museum. Accompanied by Wang Xudong, the director of the Palace Museum, they visited for about an hour.

=== 12 April ===
On the morning of 12 April, Cheng Li-wun and her entourage visited the Xiaomi car factory. She expressed her hope to bring a purple Xiaomi YU7 back to Taiwan. On the afternoon of 12 April, Cheng Li-wun took a plane and left Beijing to return to Taiwan. Song Tao, director of the Taiwan Affairs Office, went to the Beijing Capital International Airport to see her off. On 12 April, in order to implement the spirit of Xi Jinping's speech when he met with Cheng Li-wun, the Taiwan Affairs Office issued ten policy measures to promote cross-strait exchanges and cooperation, including:

- Explore the establishment of a regular communication mechanism between the Kuomintang and the Chinese Communist Party
- Establish a formalized platform for two-way exchanges between young people of the Kuomintang and the Chinese Communist Party
- Promote water, electricity, gas, and bridge connections between coastal areas of Fujian and Kinmen and Matsu
- Promote the full restoration of normalized cross-strait air passenger flights
- Facilitating the import of Taiwanese agricultural and fishery products that meet inspection and quarantine standards into mainland China
- Improve the management of cross-strait fishery access
- Facilitating the registration of qualified Taiwanese food production enterprises in mainland China and the import of Taiwanese food products into mainland China
- Study the possibility of establishing new small-scale commodity trading markets with Taiwan in suitable locations
- Permit Taiwanese TV dramas, documentaries, and animated films to be broadcast on mainland satellite TV channels and online video platforms
- Promote the resumption of the pilot program for individual travel to Taiwan Island for residents of Shanghai and Fujian provinces

== Reactions ==
On April 7, 2026, on the eve of Kuomintang chairperson Cheng Li-wen's departure for China and her scheduled meeting with CCP general secretary Xi Jinping, several small local Taiwanese political parties and civil society groups protested, including Taiwan Statebuilding Party, Green Party Taiwan, New Power Party, Taiwan Obasang Political Equality Party, Economic Democracy Union, World United Formosans for Independence, and Taiwan National Alliance, among others. The protesters argued that Cheng Li-wen's trip lacked the legitimacy to represent the will of the Taiwanese people and opposed any cross-strait negotiations involving public authority or national security that had not been authorized. Meanwhile, on the other side of the airport, groups supporting cross-strait dialogue held a rally, advocating for the promotion of peace through exchange. According to The Economist, some inside the KMT considered the visit an "overreach" on the part of Cheng Li-wun.
