= Presidential Palace (Nanjing) =

Museum and former presidential palace in Nanjing, China

China Modern History Museum
- 中国近代史遗址博物馆
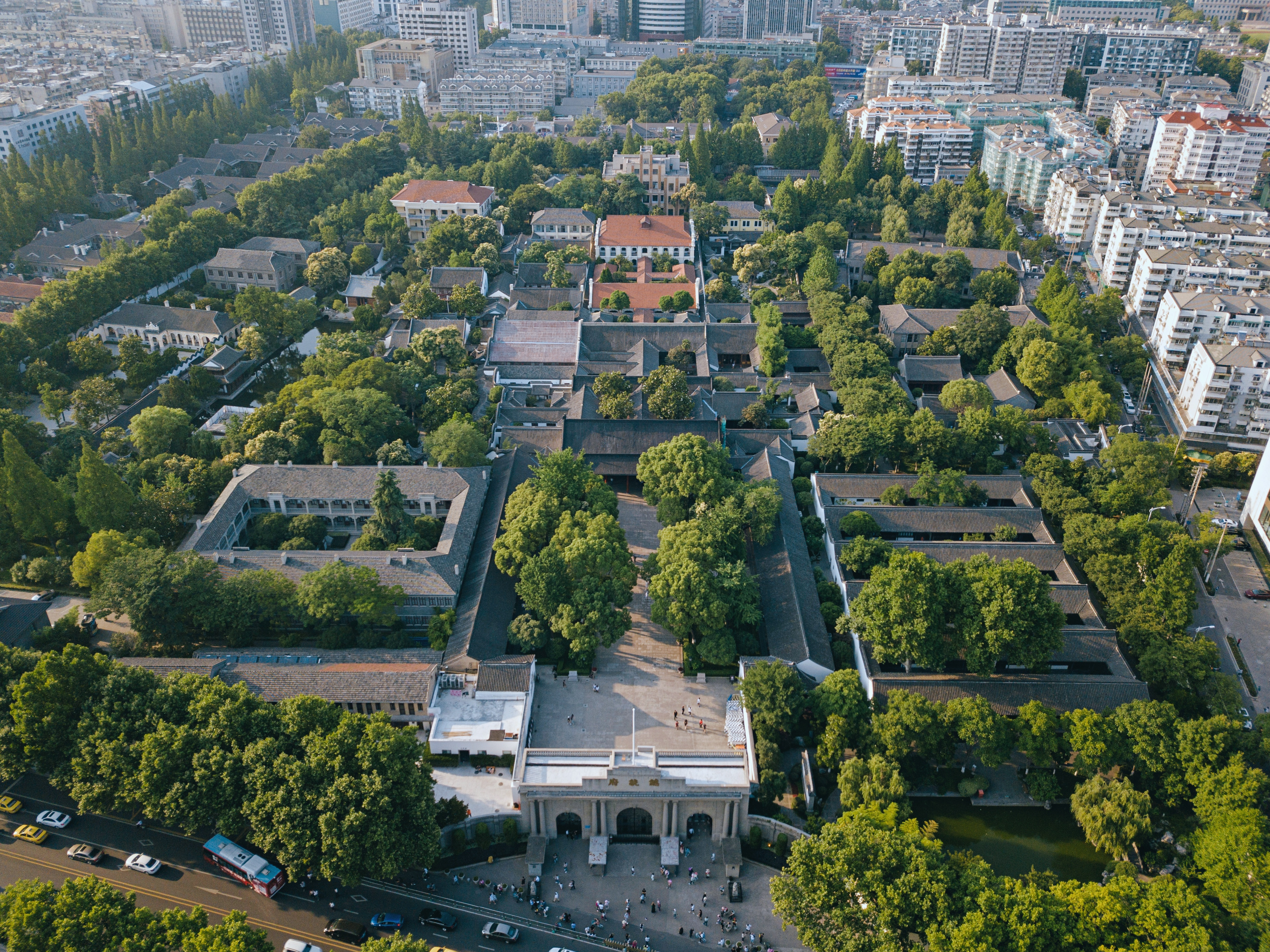
- Aerial view of the Palace, displays the sign "Presidential Palace" (總統府). Prior to 1948, the sign read "Nationalist Government" (國民政府)

- Location within China
- Established: 1980s
- Location: No.292 Changjiang Road; Xuanwu District, Nanjing, Jiangsu, China
- Coordinates: 32°2′43″N 118°47′32″E
- Type: Cultural, Historic sites
- Public transit access: Daxinggong 2 3
- Website: www.njztf.cn

Presidential Palace
- Traditional Chinese: 總統府
- Simplified Chinese: 总统府
- Literal meaning: "President's Residence"
Transcriptions
Standard Mandarin
- Hanyu Pinyin: Zǒngtǒng fǔ

The Presidential Palace (Chinese: 總統府; pinyin: Zǒngtǒng fǔ) in Nanjing, Jiangsu, China, housed the Office of the President of the Republic of China from 1927 until the capital was relocated to Taipei in 1949. It is now a museum called the China Modern History Museum. It is located at No.292 Changjiang Road (formerly Lin Sen Road), in the Xuanwu District of Nanjing.

== History ==
=== Ming and Qing era ===
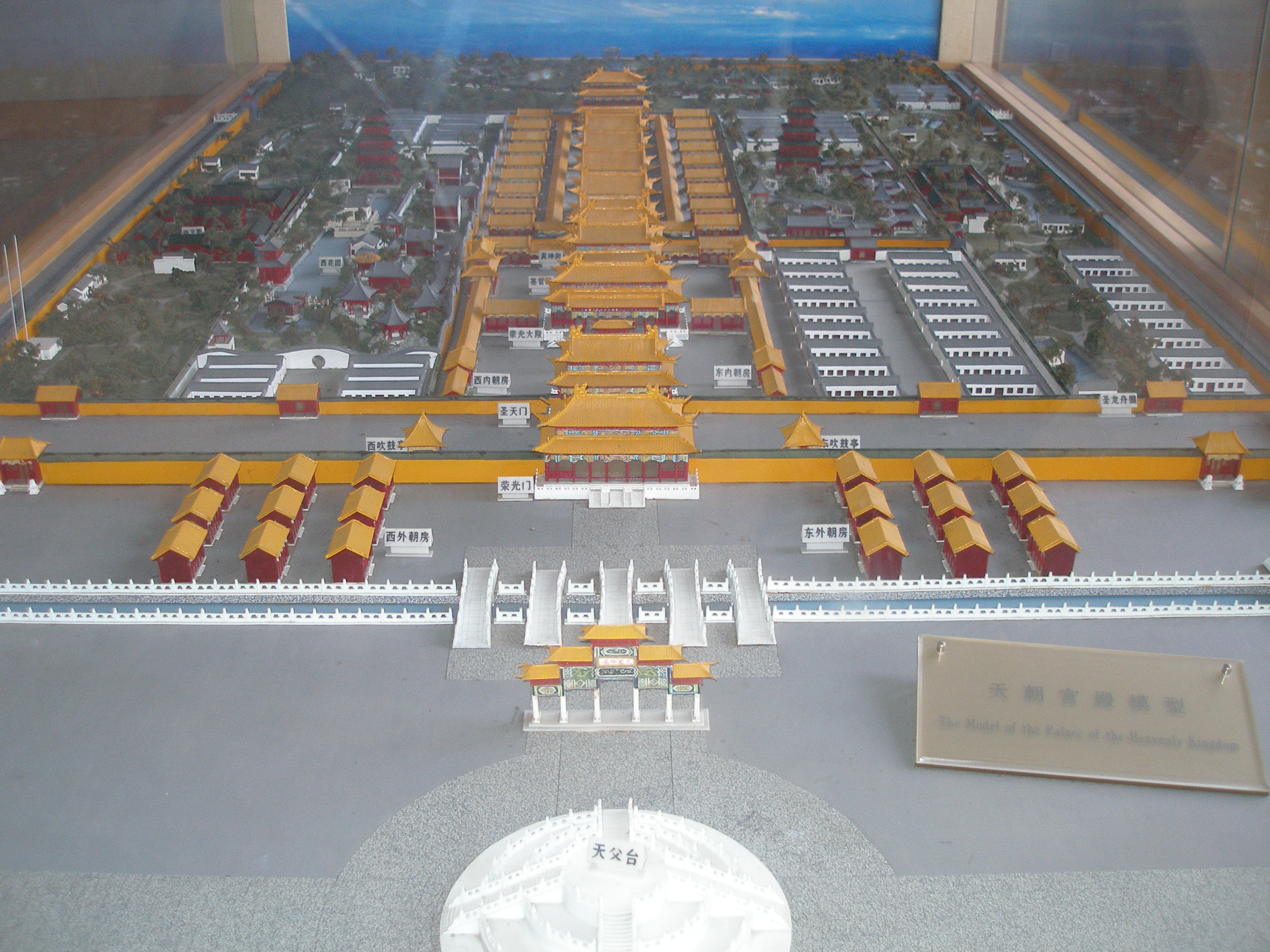
Model of the Palace of the Heavenly King (Tianwang Fu)

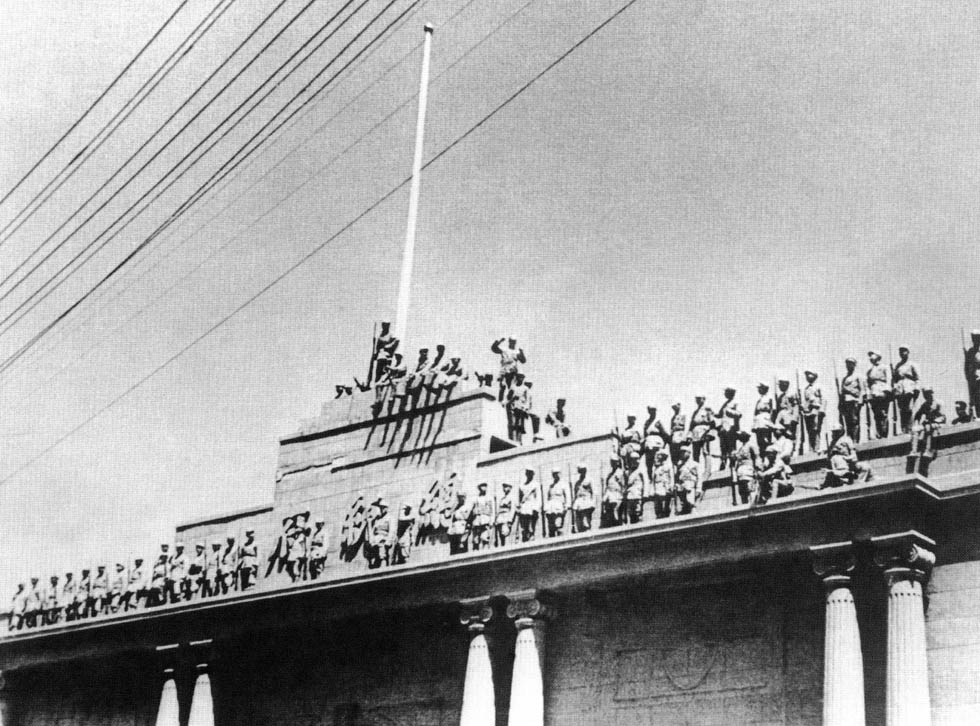
People's Liberation Army occupying the Presidential Palace in April 1949.

In the Ming dynasty, the site, west of the Ming Palace, was home to the manor of the Prince of Han Zhu Gaoxu. In the Qing dynasty, it became the Office of the Viceroy of Two Lower Yangtze Provinces, the chief government official in charge of what is today Jiangsu, Shanghai, Anhui and Jiangxi. When Qianlong visited the Lower Yangtze, he chose this office to be the detached palace together with the Imperial Silk House. Today, "Daxinggong" (lit. the Great Detached Palace) Station of Nanjing Metro Line 2 is named after it.

In 1853, Taiping Rebellion forces led by Hong Xiuquan occupied Nanjing. The palace was expanded and converted into a luxurious palace for Hong, called the Palace of the Heavenly King, or the Celestial Palace.

In 1864, Qing imperial forces re-took Nanjing. Commander Zeng Guofan ordered to destroy most of the palace by fire. He had a new palatial residence in 1870 and later imposing government buildings for the Qing Governor-General erected in the Neoclassical style, and in accordance with contemporary protocol.

=== Presidential Palace ===
After the Xinhai Revolution in 1911, Sun Yat-sen was sworn in at the former Governor-General's palace, now the "Provisional Presidential Palace", as the provisional President of the Republic of China. He kept offices here for a while.

However, China soon fell into the post-revolution Warlord era, and the Palace was not officially used by the Republic of China until 1927, when the Northern Expedition of Kuomintang (KMT) captured Nanjing. As the Nationalist Government, they transformed the Presidential Palace and adjacent buildings into the Headquarters of the Nationalist Government of the Republic of China. Premier Chiang Kai-shek had his office in the palace.

During the Second Sino-Japanese War (1937–1945), Chiang Kai-shek's government fled to Chongqing, and the Headquarters was occupied by Wang Jingwei, who collaborated with the invading Japanese. Following the Japanese surrender in 1945, Chiang Kai-shek's Nationalist Government reoccupied the Headquarters—Presidential Palace for governing the Republic of China. In 1947, the Constitution of the Republic of China was promulgated. and the "Headquarters of the Nationalist Government of the Republic of China" was renamed the "Presidential Palace."

In April 1949, near the end of the Chinese Civil War, the Communist forces captured Nanjing and the Presidential Palace. Chiang Kai-shek's government fled to Guangzhou, Guangdong and Chairman Mao Zedong declared the establishment of the People's Republic of China with capital in Beijing on 1 October 1949. The Presidential Palace building was then used for Jiangsu Provincial Government. When the ROC central government left Chengdu in December 1949, functions of the Presidential Palace were moved to the Presidential Office Building in Taipei, Taiwan.

=== Museum ===
In the late 1980s the former Presidential Palace was transformed into the China Modern History Museum, a history museum exclusively about the 20th century history of modern China, about the history of the Republic of China (1912-1949) and the history of the People's Republic of China.

In 2005, the Kuomintang Chairperson Lien Chan visited the museum in the Presidential Palace on his trip to Mainland China, marking a symbolic return of the party to the Palace for the first time in 58 years.

== Architecture ==
Located in the capital city of the Republic of China, Presidential Palace is an important historical landmark in Nanjing and one of the largest surviving complex of modern Chinese (1840-1949) buildings. It mainly consists of the central axis, the west garden and the east garden. The current structures were mainly built between 1870 and 1930s.

=== Central Axis ===
==== Main Gate ====
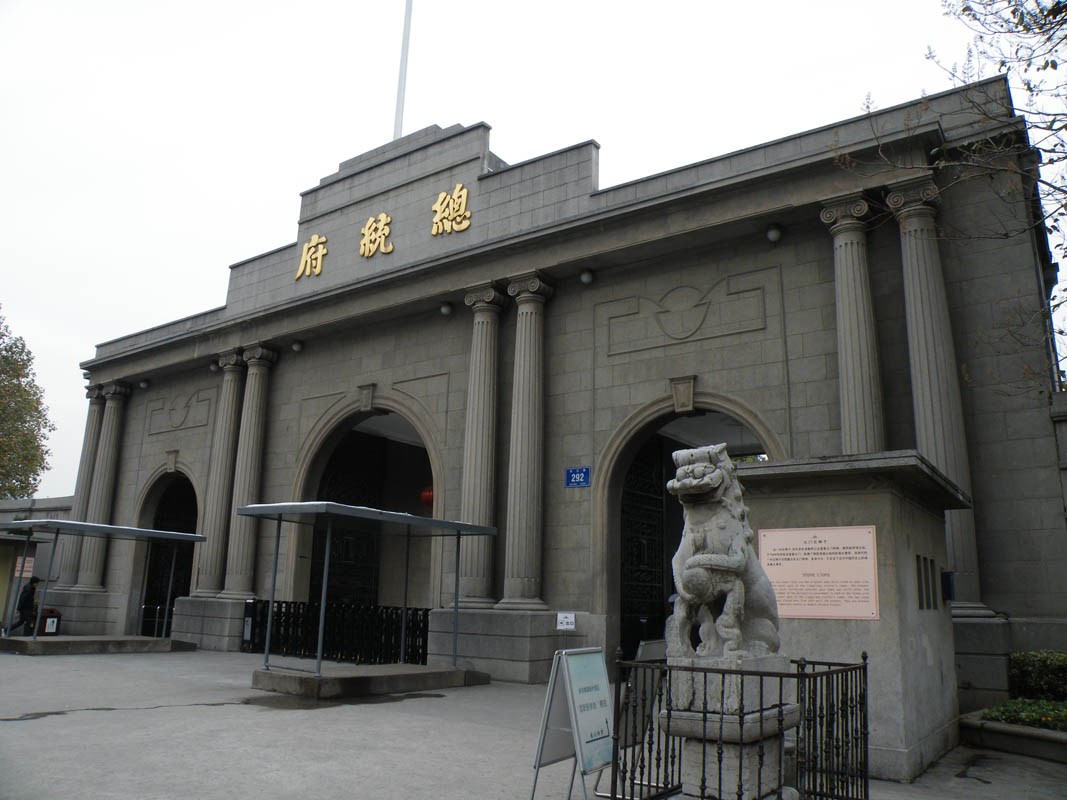
The main gate, built in 1929

It was the site of the main gate of the Viceroy's Office. During the period of Taiping Rebellion, it became the site of the Gate of True God's Glorious Light, the main gate of the Heavenly King's Palace, which was destroyed soon after the imperial troops captured the palace. In 1870, the gate was rebuilt as the main gate of the viceroy's office, and demolished when the NRA captured Nanjing in 1927.

The current gate, rebuilt in 1929, was a western-style gate with ionic columns. Two stone lions stood on either side of the gate. As the HQ of the Nationalist Government, the sign on the gate read Nationalist Government (國民政府) from 1929 to 1937 and from 1946 to 1948. During the Japanese occupation of Nanjing, it served as the main gate of Legislative Yuan and Control Yuan of the Wang Jingwei regime. After the constitutionalism and the presidential election in 1948, the sign was changed to "Presidential Palace" (總統府), which it remains until today. Nowadays, it is not only a significant symbol in downtown Nanjing, but also served as the main entrance to the Presidential Palace.

==== Main Hall ====
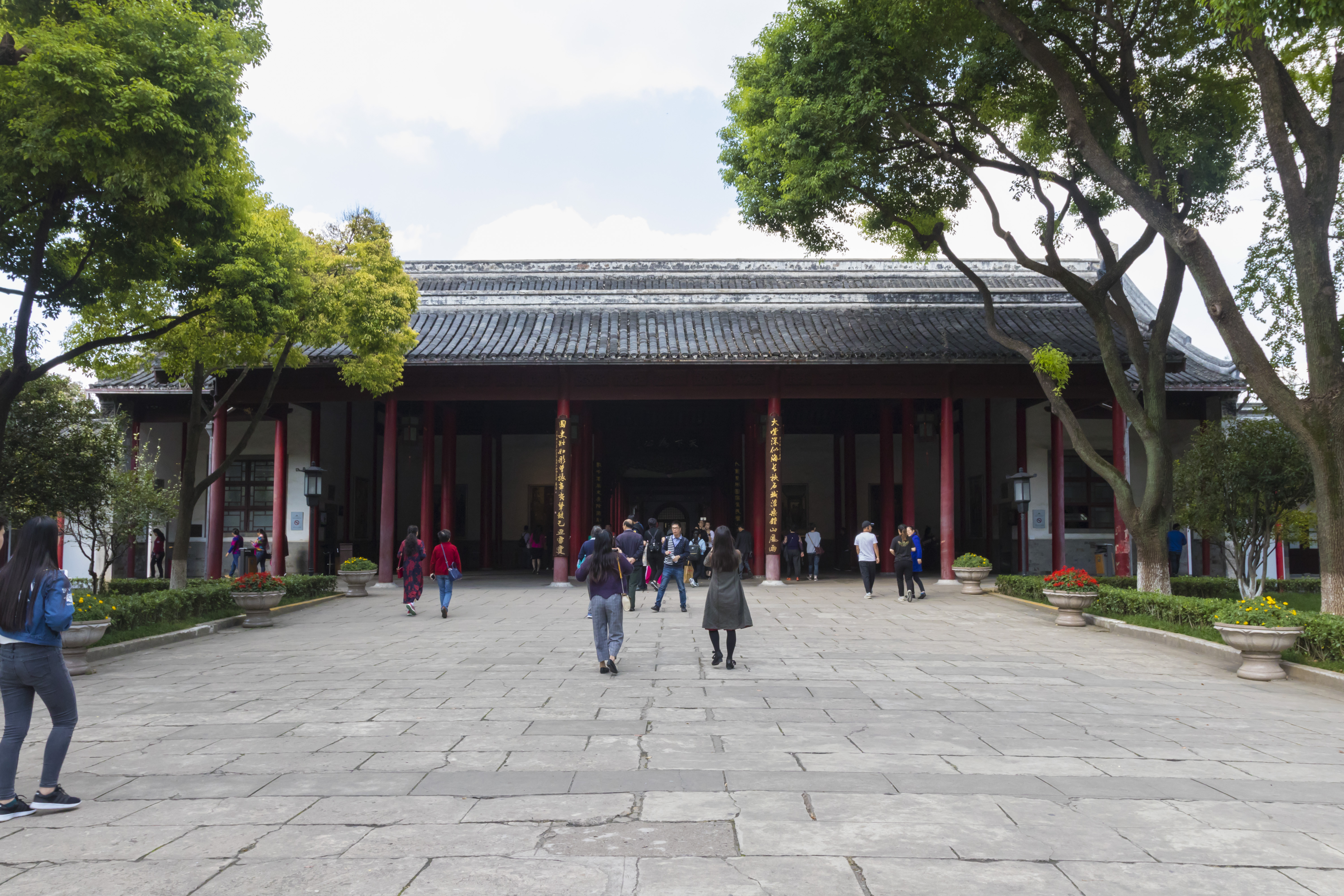
The main hall

Just located at the north of the main gate, the main hall is the first hall of the Viceroy's Palace. It was rebuilt in 1870 on the original site of the Supreme Hall of the Glorious Light, the most luxurious hall of the Heavenly King's Palace during the period of Taiping Heavenly Kingdom. It was the place where the viceroy or the Heavenly King held the ceremonies. In January 1912, the inauguration ceremony of the Provisional President was held in the "Warm Pavilion" just on the northwest side of the main hall. From 1927, it was used for government functions by the Nationalist Government and the Office of the President.

The main hall is a traditional Chinese-style hall. At the top of the hall, there is a board on which the four Chinese characters "天下為公" ("What is under heaven is for all") was written by Sun Yat-sen. Behind the main hall there is a corridor which connects it to the second hall. On the west of the corridor stands the auditorium, which was built on the ruins of the "Warm Pavilion". Heavenly King's Throne Room is located on the east side of the corridor.

==== Second Hall ====
The second hall, also known as the central hall, rebuilt in the late 19th century, was the site of the Heavenly King's inner court. During the period of the Nationalist Government, some minor ceremonies were held in the hall. There is an aisle that lead the visitors to the reception hall.

==== Reception Hall ====
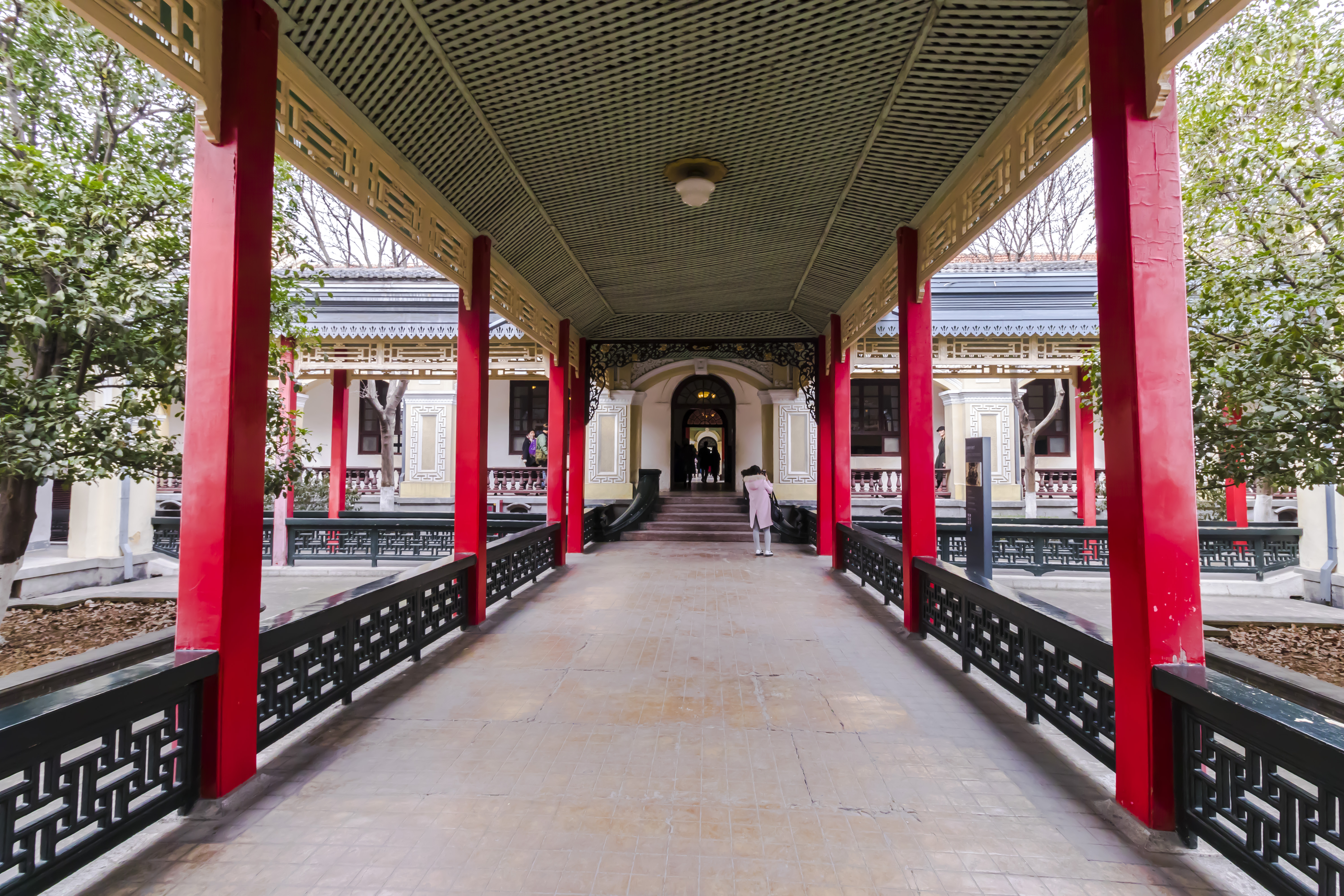
The reception hall

Also known as the "八字廰" (literally "Hall of Character 'Eight'"), the western-style reception hall of the Presidential Palace was built in 1917 by Feng Guozhang, Vice President of the Republic of China at that time. After the Northern Expedition of the National Revolutionary Army, it became the reception rooms for the civil and foreign guests of the Nationalist Government. Before the Chinese Civil War began, Some negotiations between Chinese Communist Party and KMT were signed in this hall. In addition, Chiang Kai-shek, Lin Sen and Li Zongren also rested here before the ceremonies began frequently. President Chiang Kai-shek occasionally worked here instead of the Presidential Building.

The Kirin Gate is a red gate situated on the north of the reception hall. This gate would open only if the president went through this place. The gate leads to the House of the Government Affairs, the original office building of the Chairman of the Nationalist Government.

==== House of the Government Affairs ====
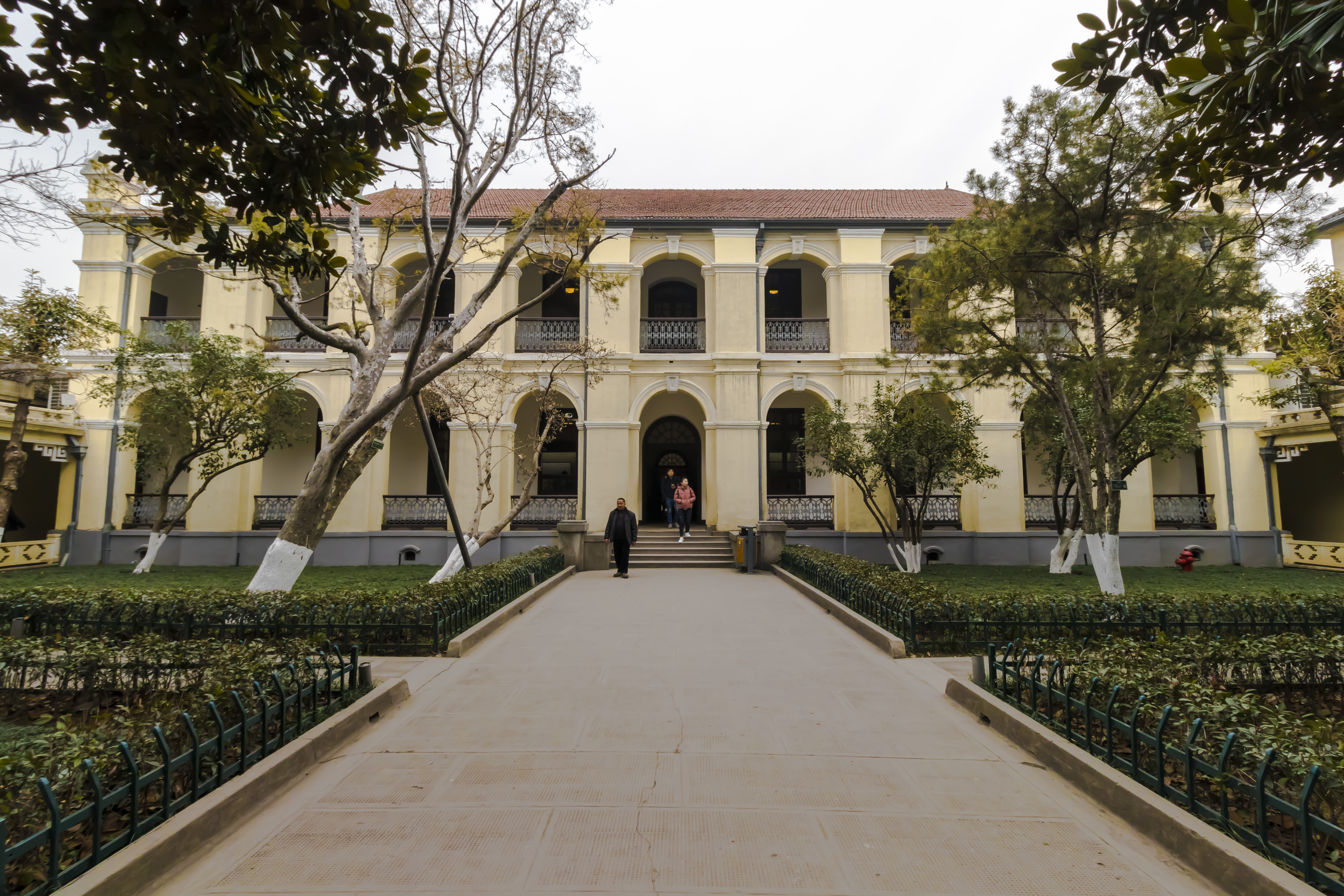
North facade of the House of the Government Affairs

The House of the Government Affairs, also known as the House of the Government Officials and the House of Documentary Affairs, was built in 1925 by Sun Chuanfang. Originally served as the Jiangsu military governor's office, it became the office building of the Chairman and other officials of the Nationalist Government from 1928 to 1935. As Chiang Kai-shek was the chairman from 1928 to 1931, there was a room in the second floor that once served as Chiang's office.

From 1946 to 1949, this house was converted into the House of the Government Affairs. The Ministry of the Government Affairs mainly dealt with the works of writing articles and checking confidential documents. Chen Bulei, an official of the government held the house as his office. Today, the house is served as the Museum of the President and the Vice President, with some collections from the Nationalist Government. Out of the house, there is a courtyard that leads to the Presidential Building, one of the most important buildings in the palace complex.

==== Presidential Building ====
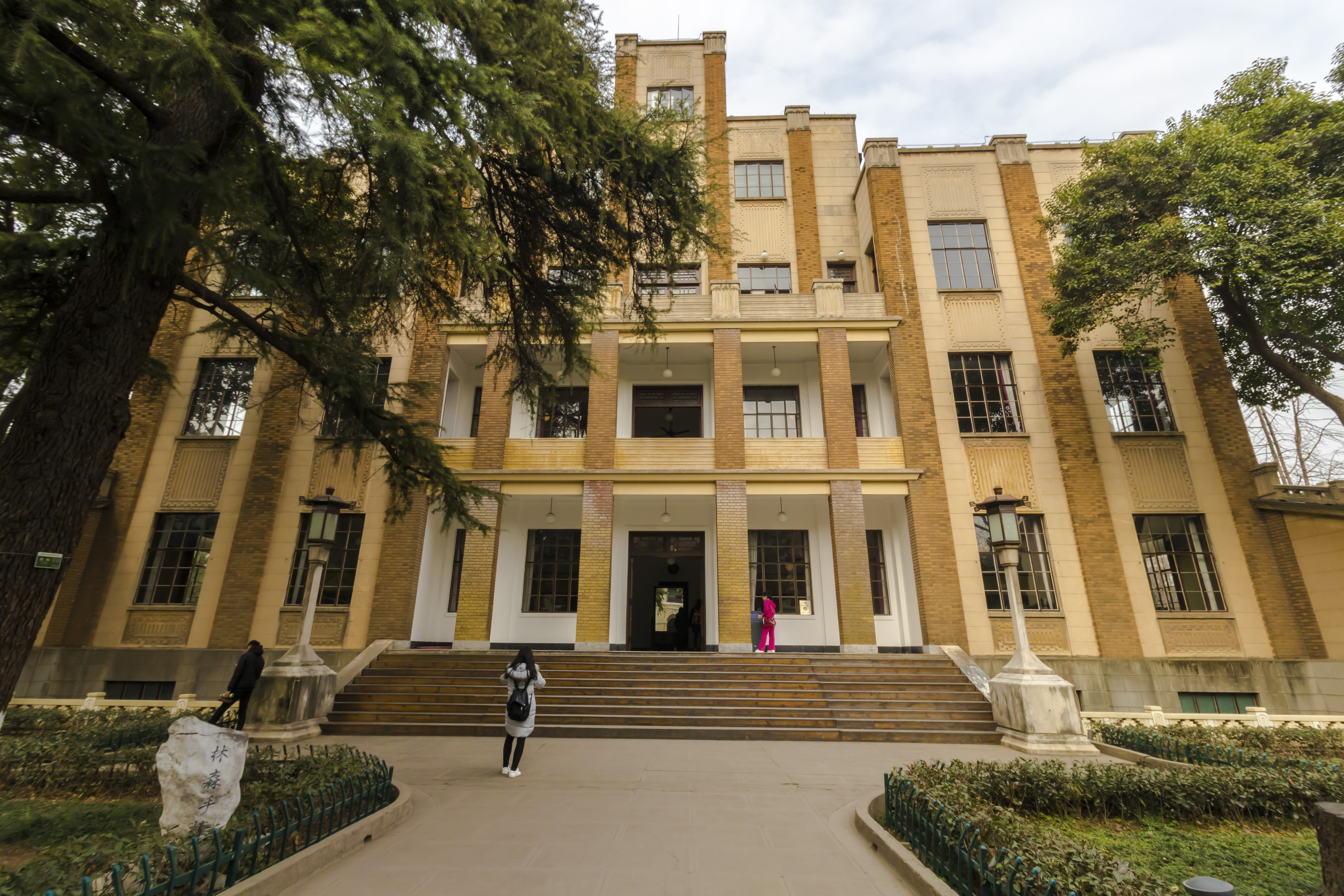
South facade of the Presidential Building

The Presidential Building, also known as "Zichao House" and the Concrete House, was one of the most important buildings in the complex. Situated on the northernmost part in the palace, the six-storey house with the structure of reinforced concrete was one of the tallest buildings in Nanjing in the 1930s. The construction started in 1934, and finished in December 1935. Lin Sen used this house as the office of Chairman of the Nationalist Government until the Japanese troops captured Nanjing. From 1940 to 1945, this Japanese-occupied house was converted into the office of the Legislative Yuan and the Control Yuan of the Reorganized National Government. In 1946, Chiang's Nationalist Government re-took Nanjing, then used this house as the office of the Nationalist Government for the second time. After the presidential inauguration ceremony in 1948, it became the seat of the president of the ROC. In April 1949, the People's Liberation Army took control of this house. The house lost the position of the president's seat from then on. From December 1949, the Presidential Office Building of Taipei has become the seat of the ROC president. In Mainland China, Zhongnanhai became the seat of the central government and the official residence of the Leader of the Chinese Communist Party since October 1949.

Two cedars were planted in 1934 by Chairman Lin Sen on both sides of the courtyard in the front of the Presidential Building. The cedar on the east side was dead in 2005 and was cut down in 2013. The building was designed by Yu Binglie, who was the head of the department of architecture, National Central University. Inside the house, the first floor was served as the office of the Secretary-General to the President, the highest-ranking official in the Office of the President who supervised the staff of the Office. The presidential office and vice presidential office were both on the second floor. The meeting room of the State Affair Council was located on the third floor.

===== Presidential Office =====
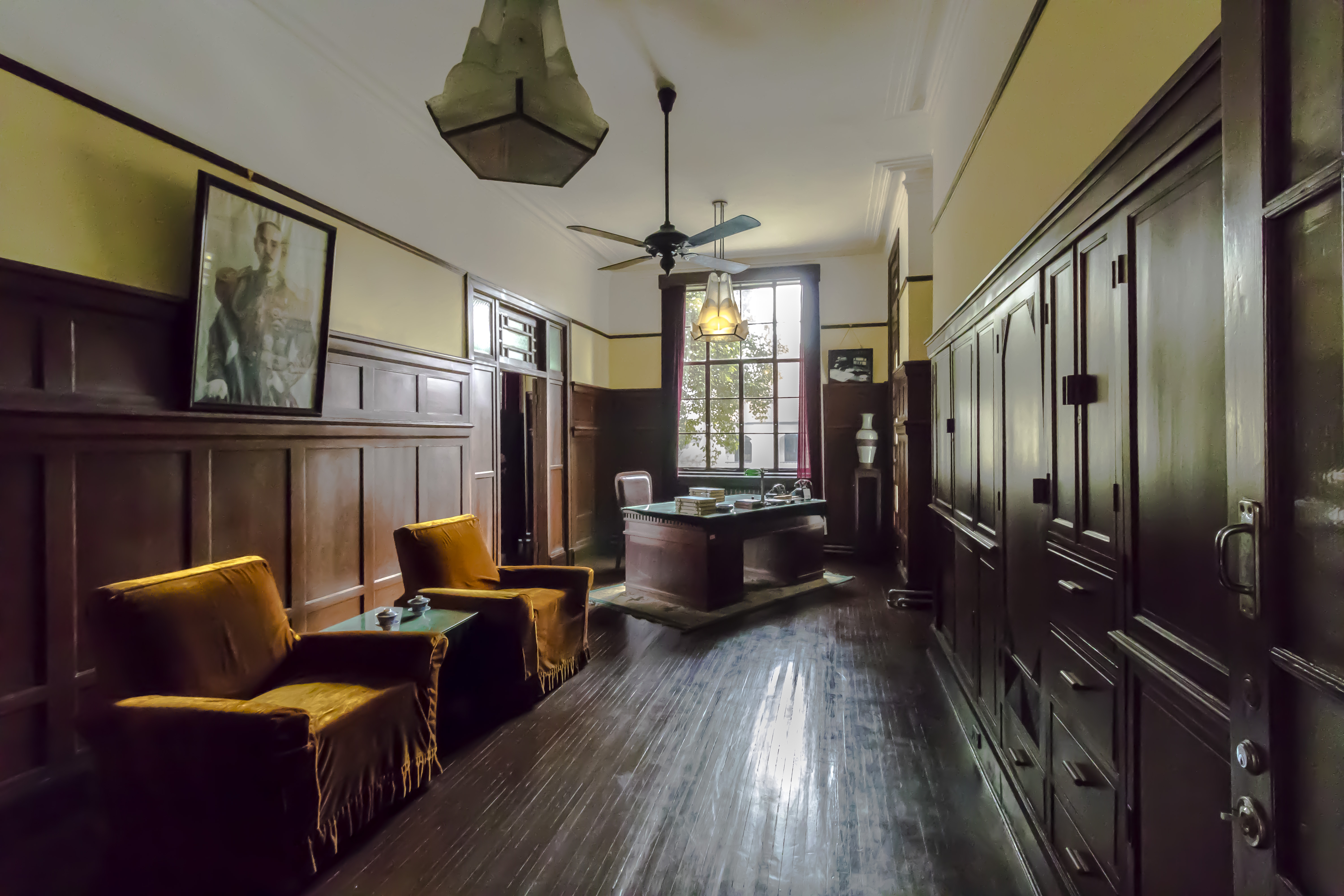
The Presidential Office

The Presidential Office was the office of the president of the ROC since 20 May 1948. It is also known as the Office of Chiang Kai-shek because Chiang was the only president who used this as the presidential office. Situated on the southeast corner of the second floor, it composed of three rooms. The middle one was served as the principal working place of the president. Inside the middle room, a huge secretaire was put sideways next to the window, with a French-made droplight above. And above the brown couch, a huge photograph of Chiang was hung on the side wall. There was an Otis elevator near the office, but Chiang Kai-shek seldom used it. Although President Chiang Kai-shek wasn't working here all the time, this office is still one of the most popular sites for the visitors in the Presidential Palace.

===== Vice Presidential Office =====
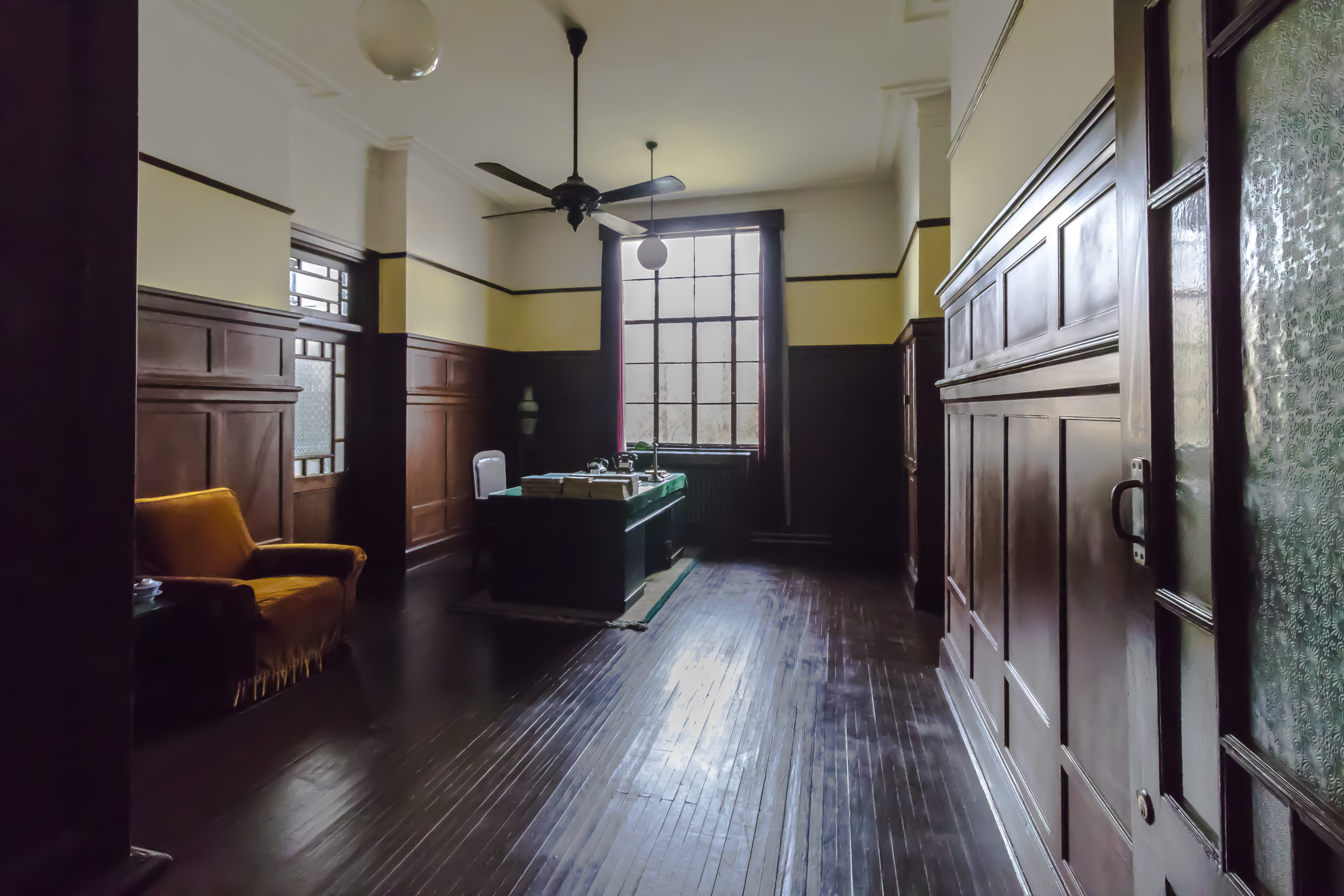
The Vice Presidential Office

The vice presidential office lied opposite the presidential office, also known as Li Zongren's office. As well as the presidential office, it was served as the office of the vice president since 20 May 1948. But the relationship between Li Zongren and Chiang Kai-shek was not very good, so the vice president usually worked in his residence in Gulou District instead of this office to avoid meeting Chiang.

===== State Affairs Council Room =====
During the period of the Nationalist Government, the State Affairs Council usually dealt with the domestic affairs such as the publication of laws and orders, and the appointment of officials. The State Affairs Council Room was situated on the third floor of the Presidential Building. In the northern wall of this room, a horizontal board inscribed with "fidelity, filialness, benevolence, kindness, good faith, calm and peace" written by Lin Sen, the chairman of the Nationalist Government in 1935. On the desk, a glass bottle was put on the northernmost side except for numerous teacups. According to the relevant record, the bottle belonged to Chiang Kai-shek because unlike others' habit, he liked drinking water rather than tea.

=== The West Garden ===
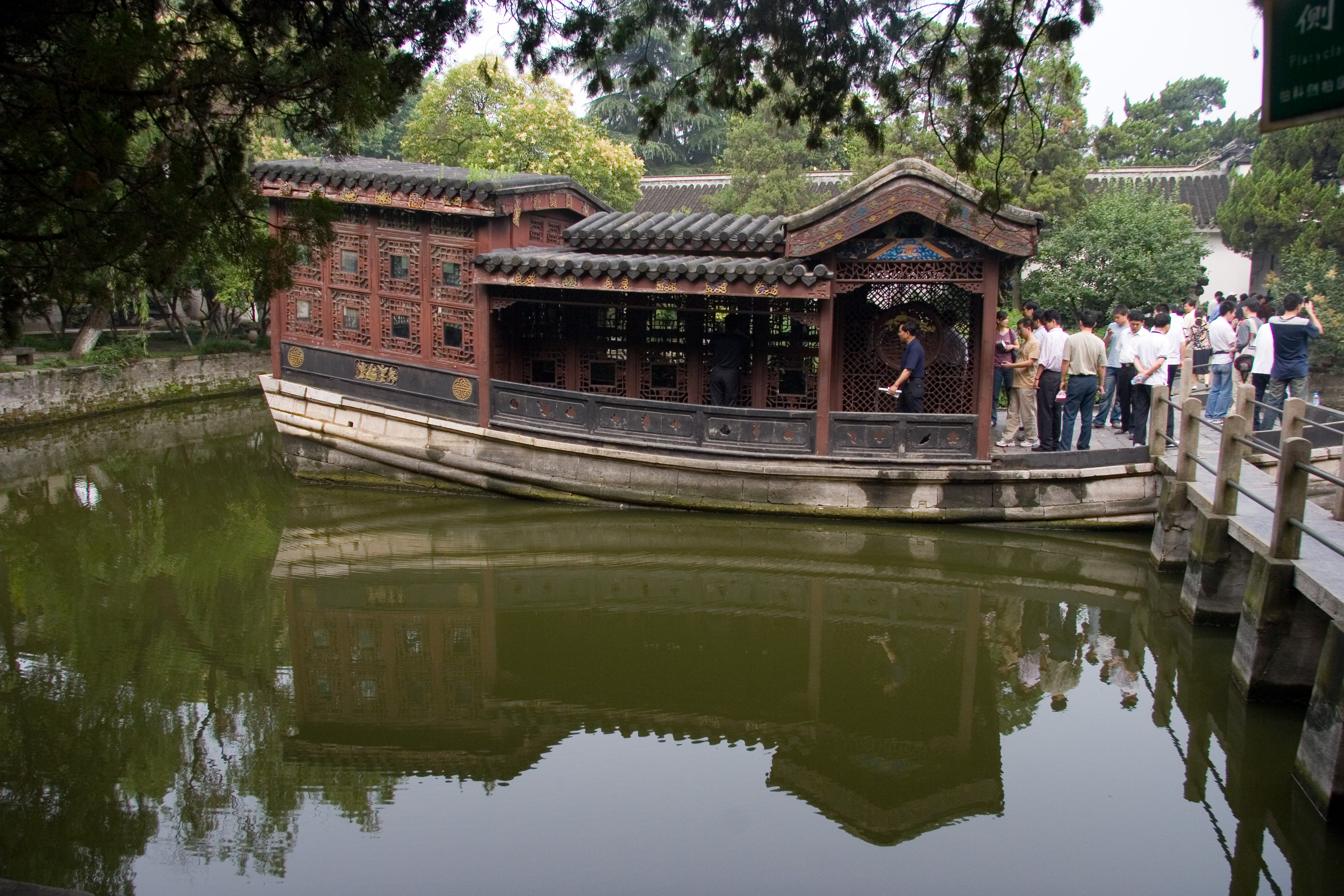
The Marble Boat in the West Garden

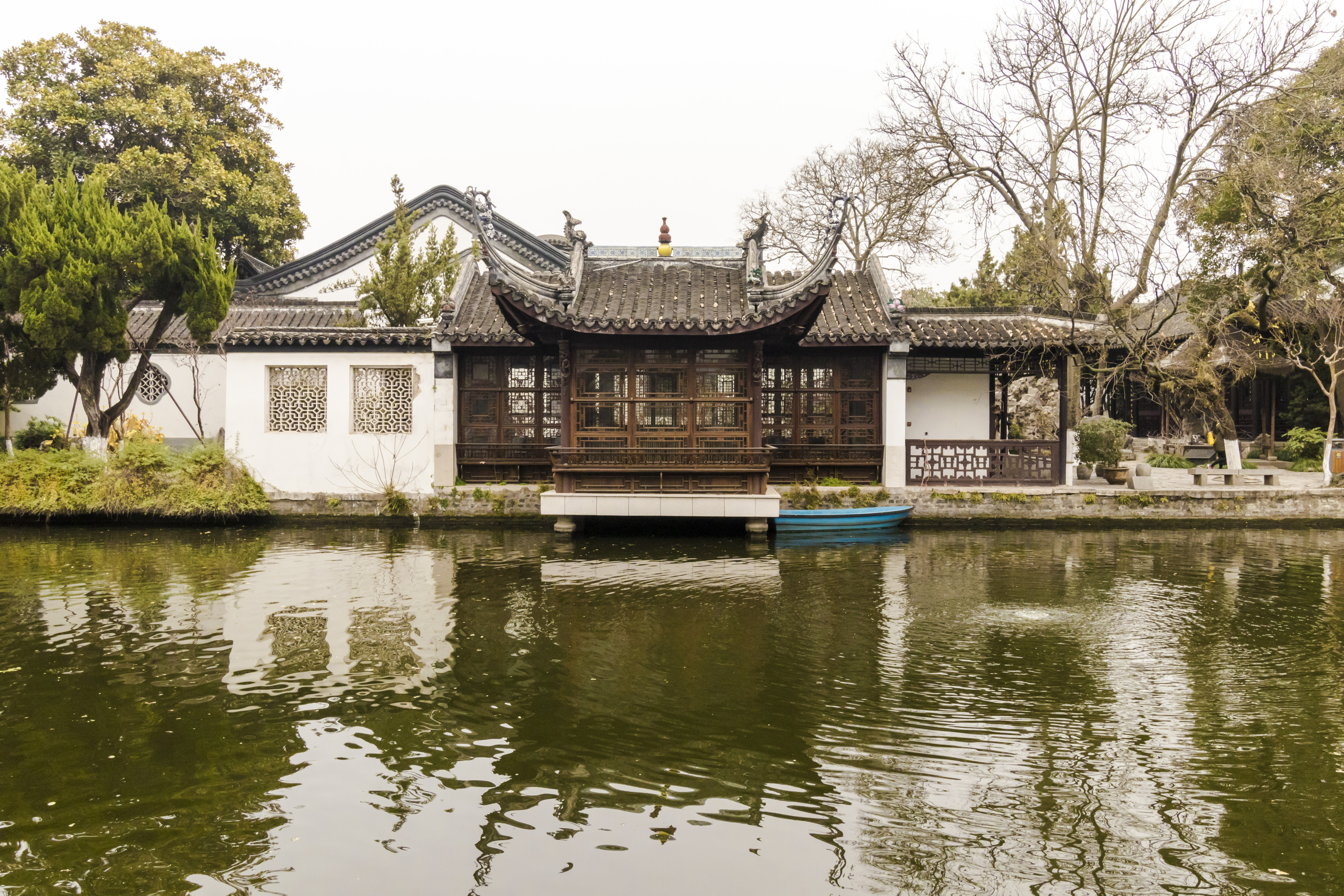
The Attic of Joy on the right of the picture

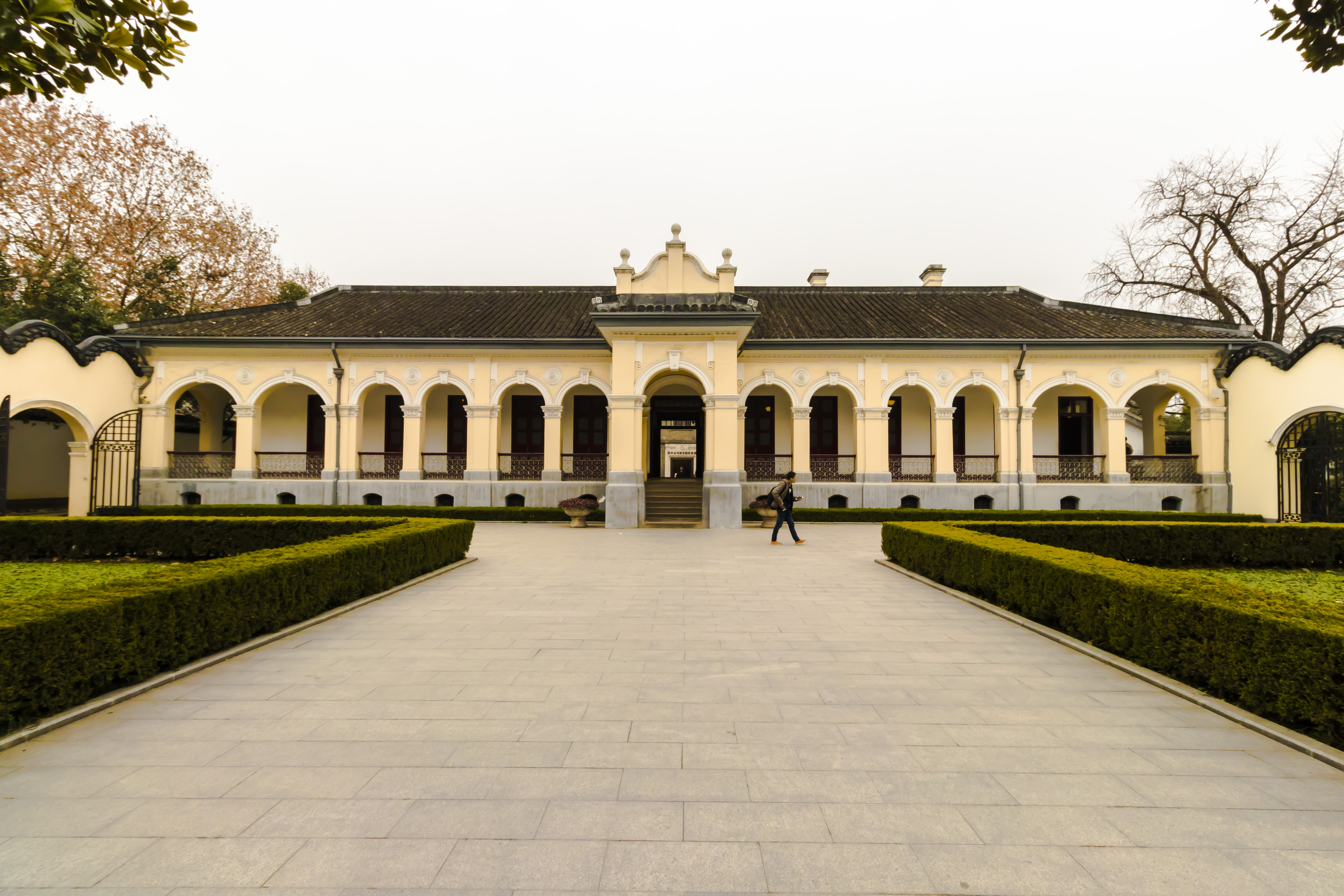
The Commission House, also known as the West Garden Hall, once occupied by Sun Yat-sen and Chiang Kai-shek

The West Garden, also called Xu Garden, is a classical southern Chinese garden located just on the west of the Presidential Palace's central axis, which was considered as the finest work of the gardens in Nanjing together with Zhanyuan Garden. Centered on the Taiping Lake (literally "Pacific Lake"), various pavilions and attics built in the 1870s, including the Marble Boat, the Paulownia Melody House, the Tower of Beautiful Sunset, the Ripples Pavilion, the Palm Pavilion, the Mandarin Duck Pavilion, the Provisional President's Living Room and the Attic of Joy are all located on the shore of the lake.

==== The Marble Boat ====
The Marble Boat is the oldest surviving structure in the Presidential Palace complex, which was built when Qianlong visited Jiangning (the former name of Nanjing). To please the emperor, the official told him that the name of the structure was called the "unmoored boat", as the metaphor of the firmness of the Qing dynasty's regime. The 14.5-meter-long timber-mimic stony boat is one of the best-known structures in the garden.

==== Attic of Joy ====
The Attic of Joy, alternatively called the Pavilion that Forgetting to Fly and the Waterside Pavilion, was rebuilt in 1870 on the eastern lakeside of the garden. The government official once worked here were surprised at the attractive view and believed that "if the birds saw the view here, they would have so much joy that they could forget how to fly". That was the origin of the name. In the 1930s, this attic once served as one of the offices of the Military Affairs Commission, one of the most powerful organizations in Nationalist China.

==== General Staff House ====
The General Staff House was built in 1935, which was the seat of Ho Ying-chin, the General Staff of the Nationalist Government. Its function now is the exhibition hall of the theme "Sun Yat-sen and the Provisional Government in Nanjing".

==== Commission House ====
The Commission House, variously called the West Garden Hall and the Office of the Provisional President, was built in 1909 by Duanfang, the 80th Viceroy of Liangjiang, who visited Europe just before the construction started. The construction finished in 1910, during the period of Zhang Renjun, the last Viceroy of Liangjiang. From 1 January 1912, the house was used as the office of the provisional president by Sun Yat-sen, thus becoming one of the birthplace of the Republic of China. The first cabinet council of the provisional government was held in the house as well. Since 1927, the house was served as the seat of the Military Affairs Commission, which grasped the real power of the Nationalist Government. Today this yellow house is also a popular tourist attraction in the Presidential Palace.

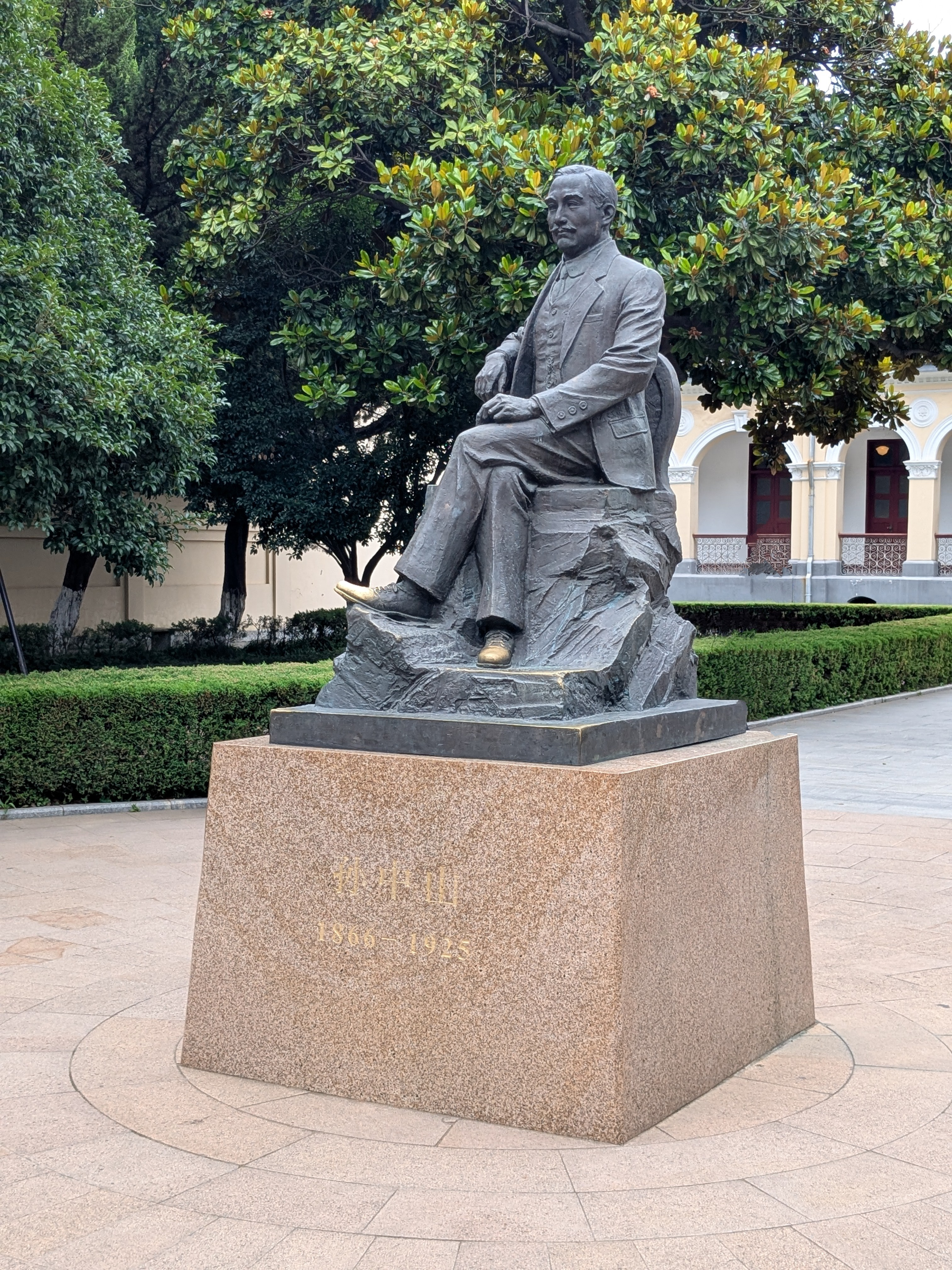
Statue of Sun Yat-sen

=== The East Garden ===
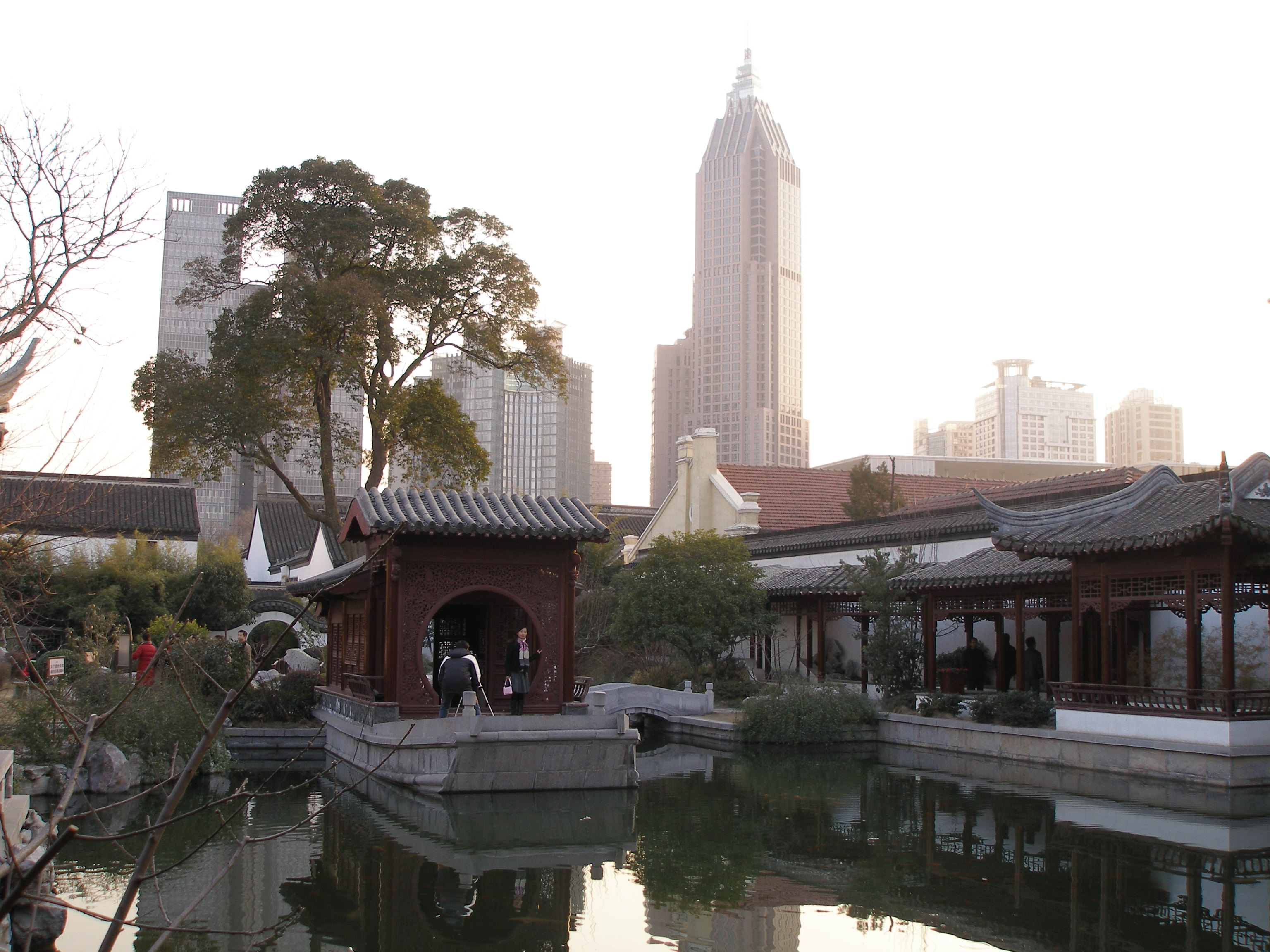
The East Garden

The East Garden, also known as the Restored Garden, was the additional garden of the viceroy's office. During the period of Taiping Rebellion, it became the east garden of the Celestial Palace. After the troops of Qing dynasty recaptured the palace, the east garden was totally destroyed. When the Nationalist Government came to Nanjing, some minor office buildings attached to the Executive Yuan were built on the site, which were all demolished in the 2000s. In 2003, the garden was partly rebuilt according to the historical information and relics. Some other buildings, like the warehouse, were rebuilt at the same time.

The Executive Houses, the seat of the Executive Yuan from 1928 to 1937 were located on the north side of the garden.

==== Executive Houses ====
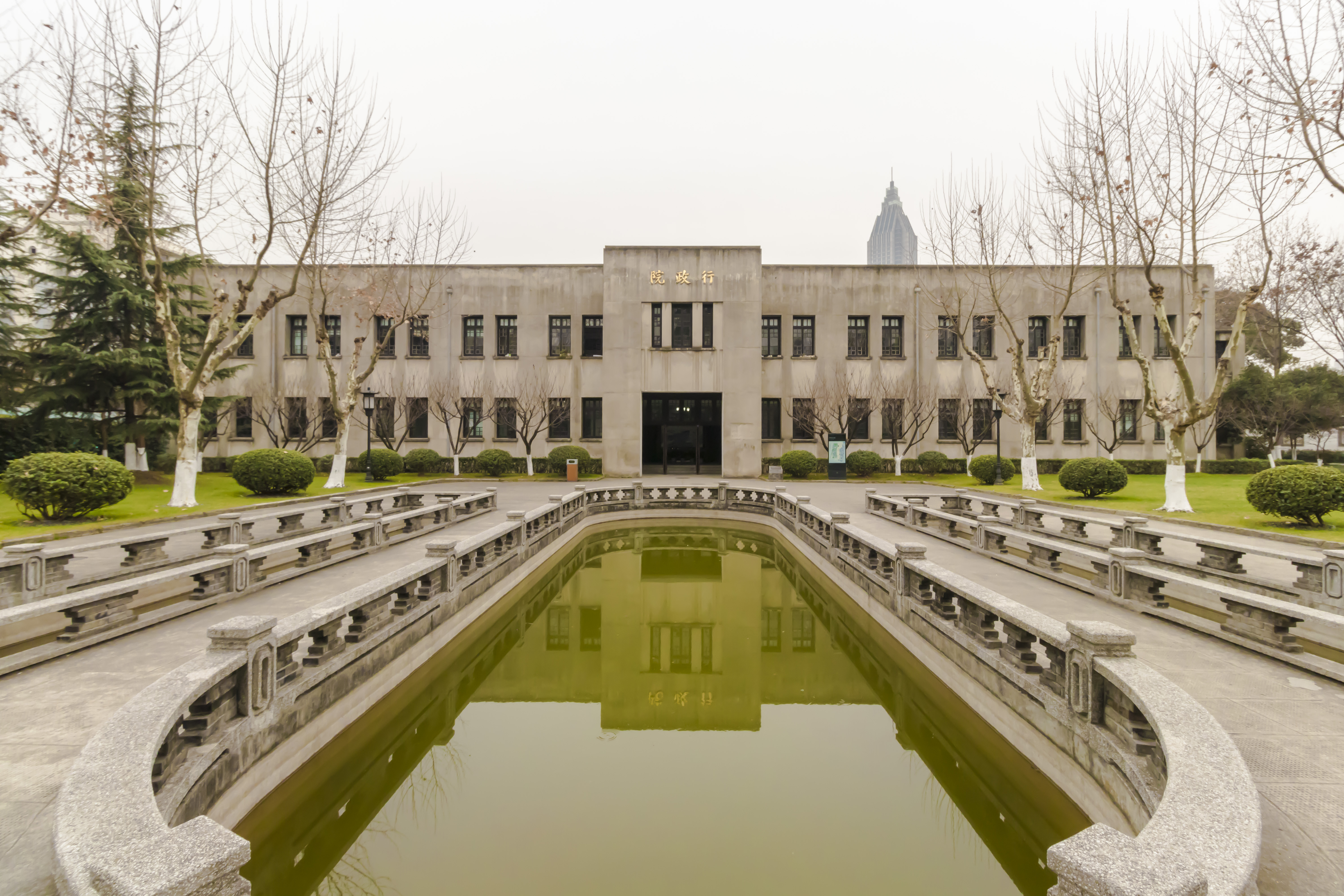
North Executive House

The Executive Houses were the seat of the Executive Yuan from 1928 to 1937. In November 1937, the Executive Yuan was moved to the city of Chongqing. The houses were served as the offices of Ministry of Railways and Ministry of Transportation and Communication in the period of the Wang Jingwei regime and later served as the seat of Ministry of Social Affairs and Ministry of Water Conservancy.

The Executive Houses were divided into two blocks. The North Executive House, also known as the North Block of the Executive Yuan Building, mainly housed the office of the Premier from 1928 to 1934 until the South Executive House was finished working. The South Executive House, also known as the South Block of the Executive Yuan Building, mainly housed the office from 1934 to 1937 until the Nationalists lost Nanjing and fled to Chongqing. Premiers including Chiang Kai-shek, Wang Jingwei, H. H. Kung and T. V. Soong once worked in the premier's office in the South Block.

== Transportation ==
The building is accessible within walking distance north of Daxinggong station of Nanjing Metro.

== Gallery ==
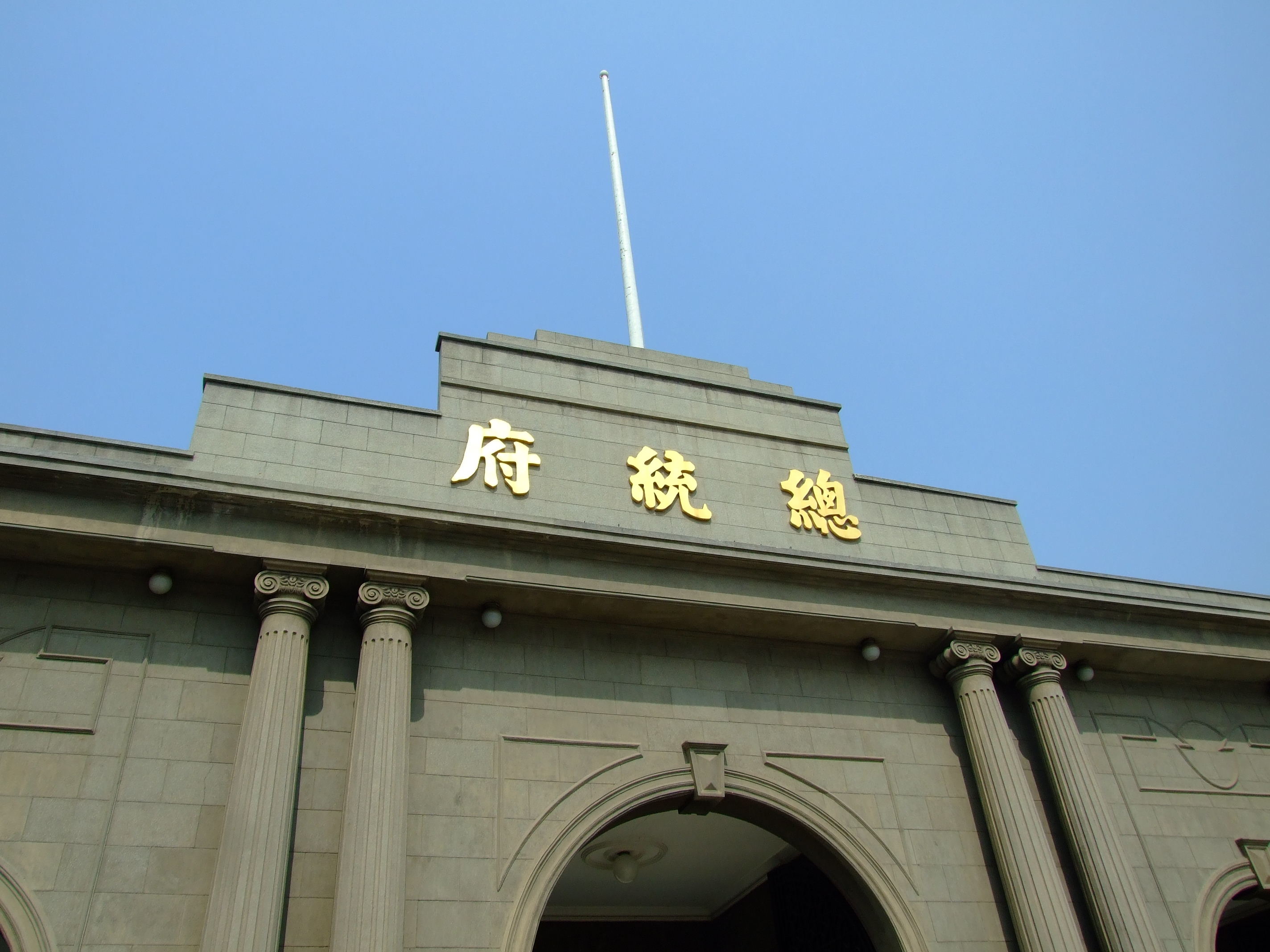
Main gate of the Presidential Palace

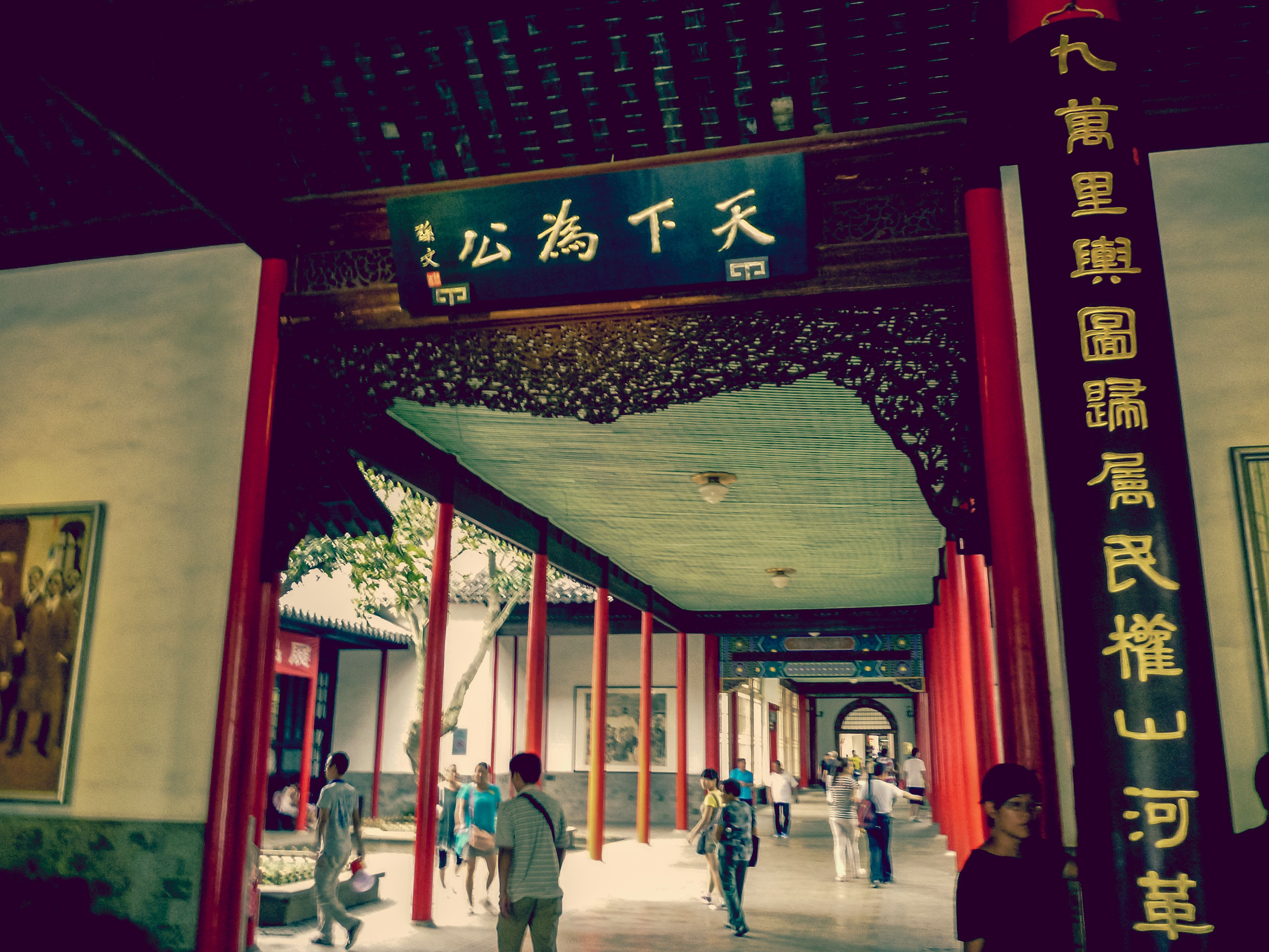
Inside the main hall

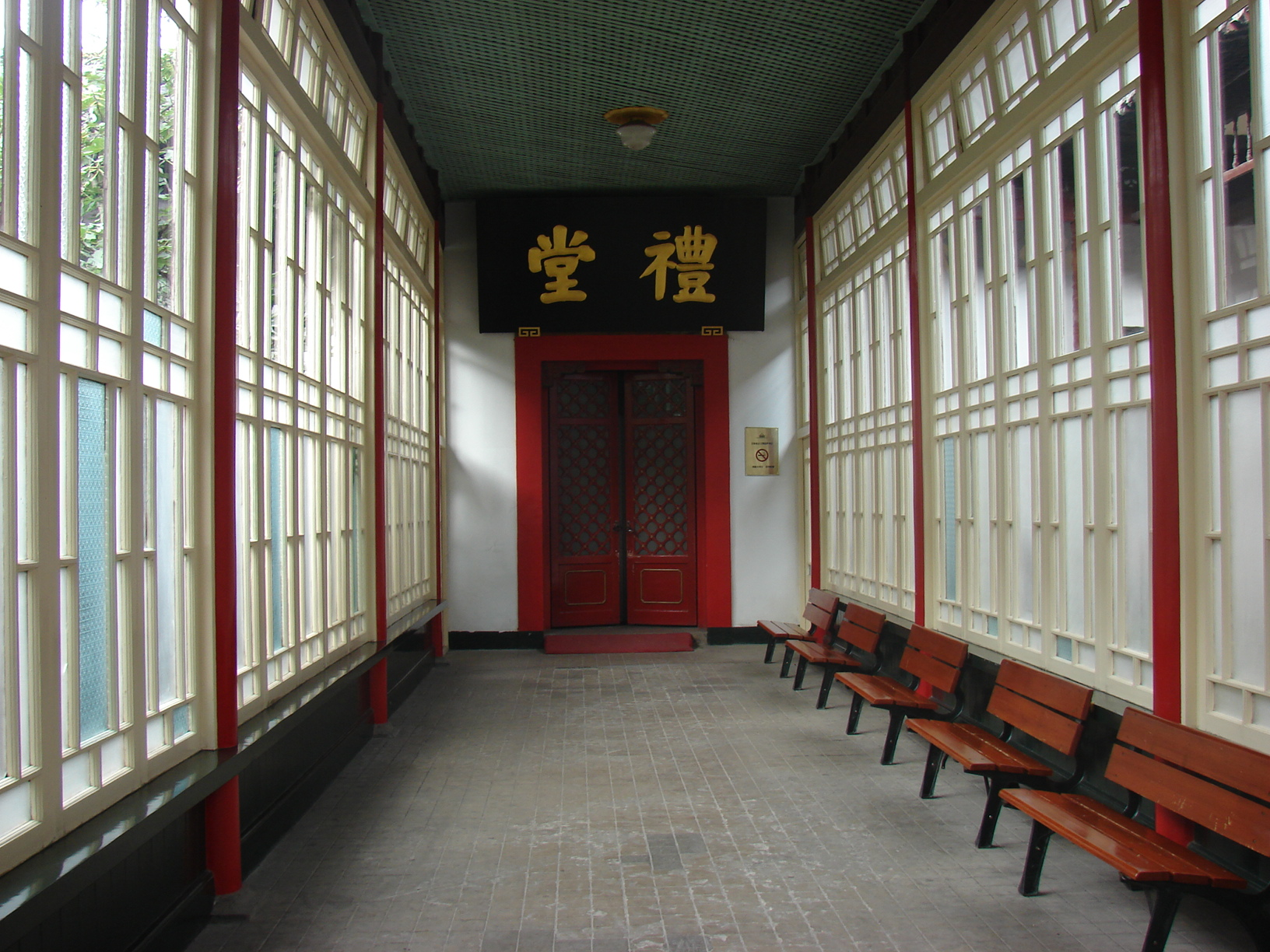
The entrance to the auditorium

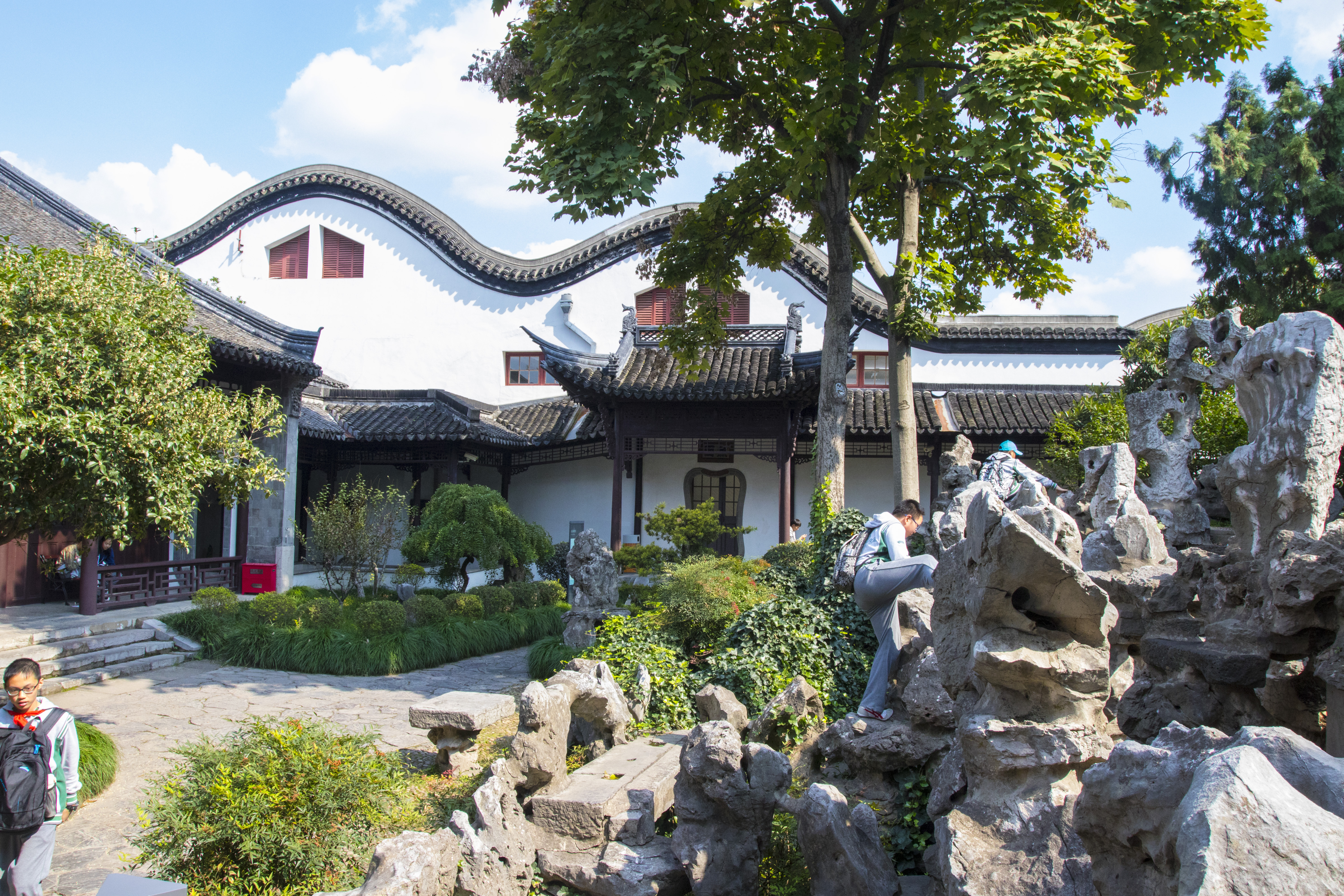
The auditorium seen from the West Garden

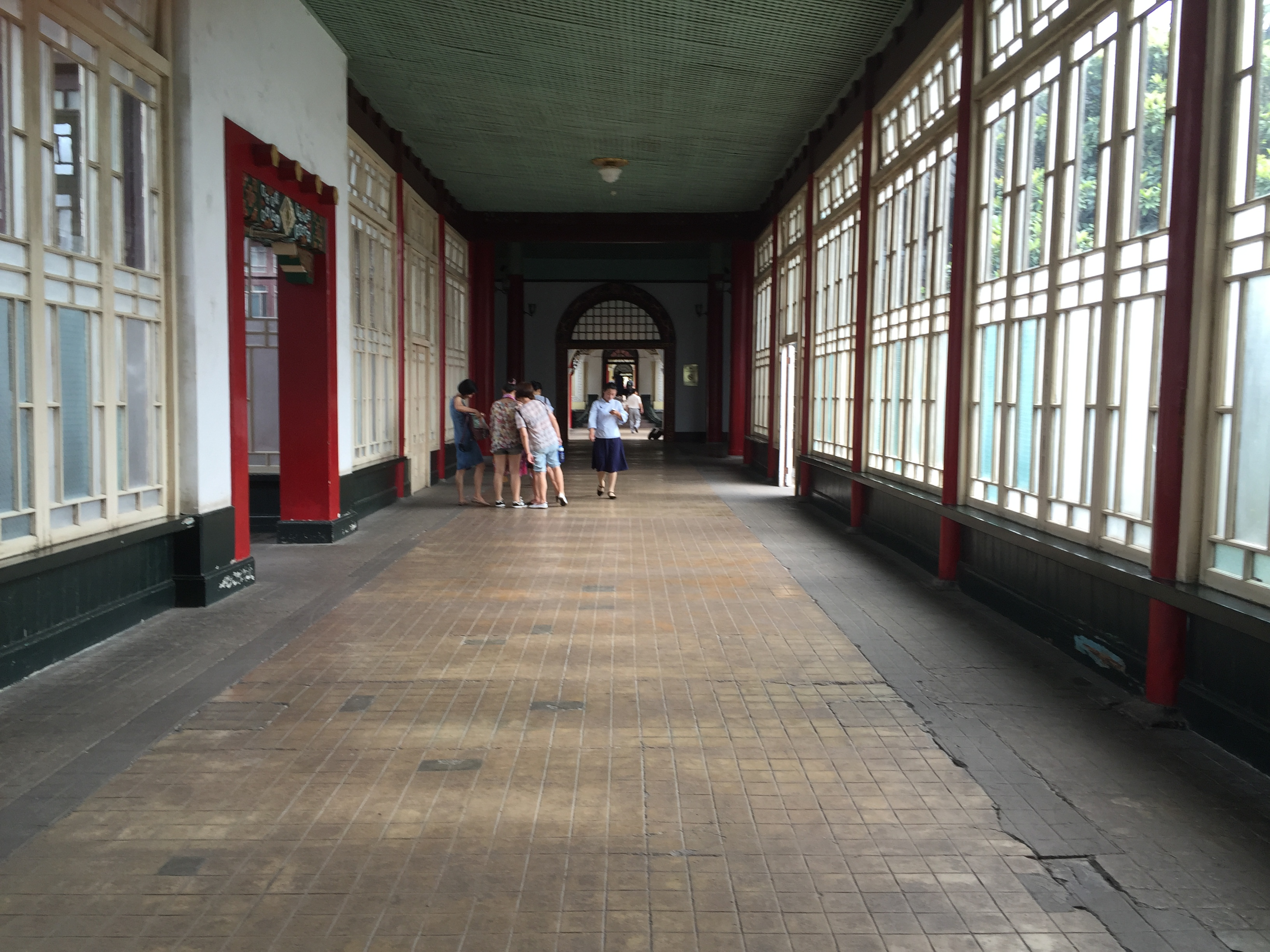
The corridor to the second hall

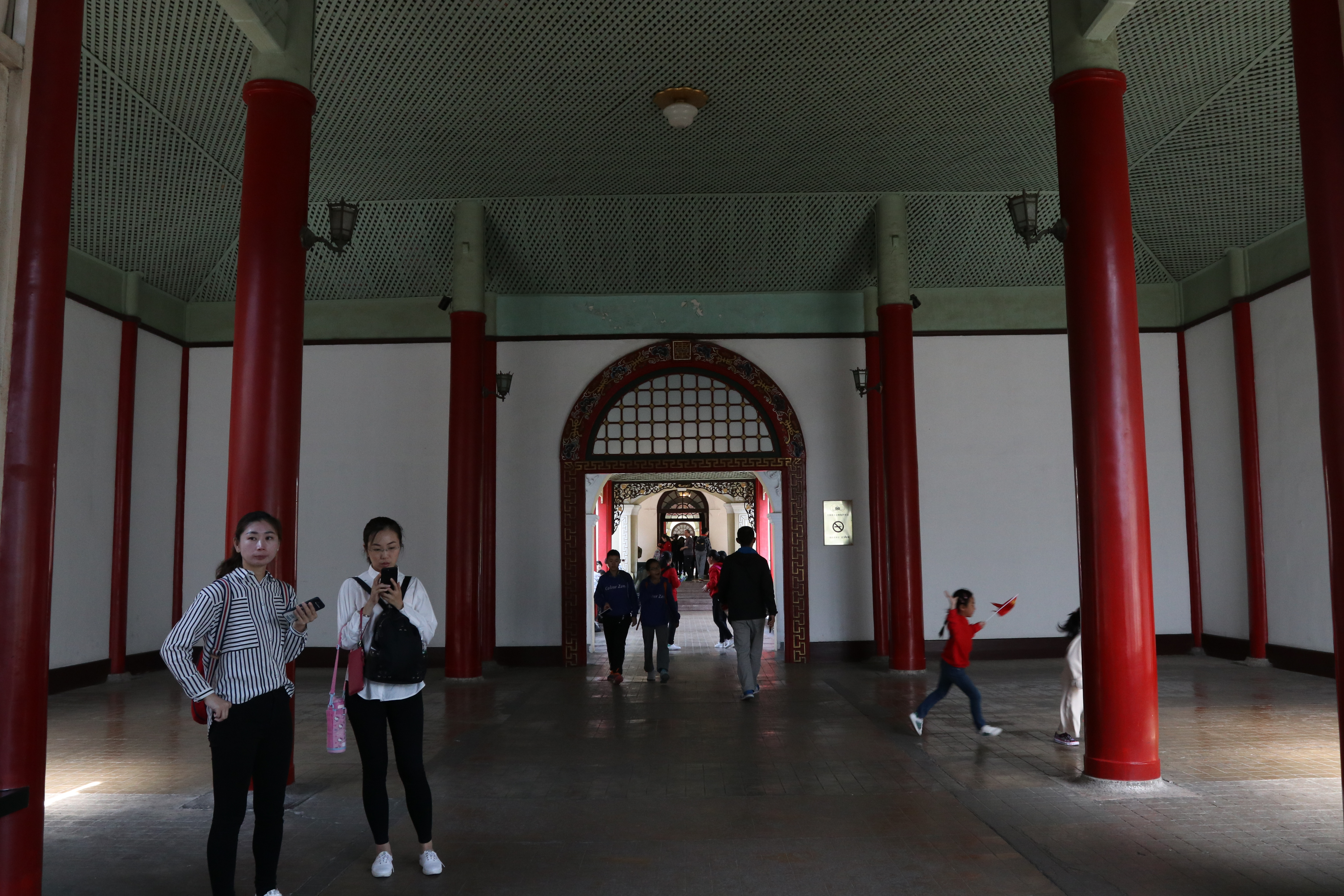
Inside the second hall

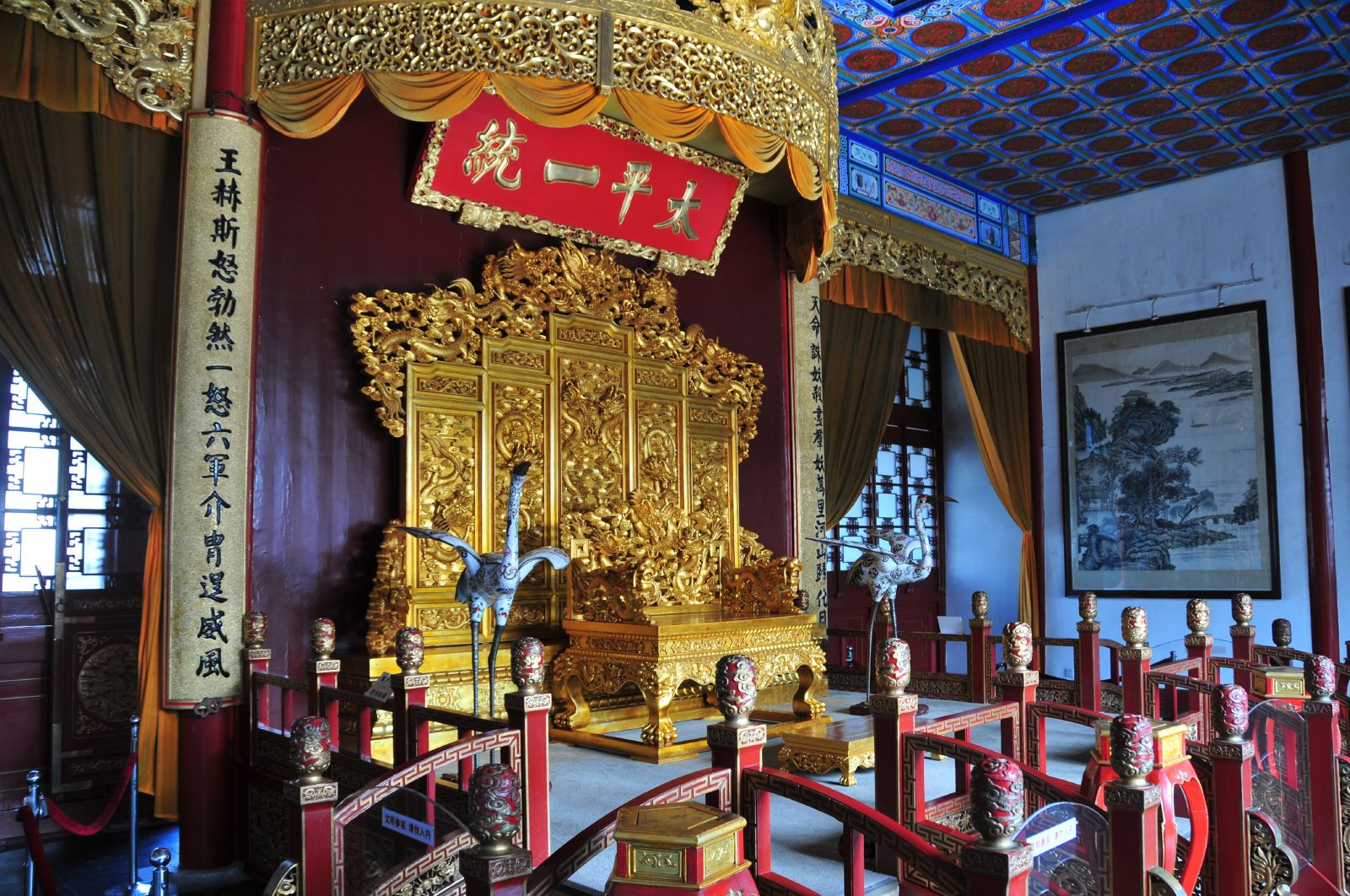
The throne of Hong Xiuquan

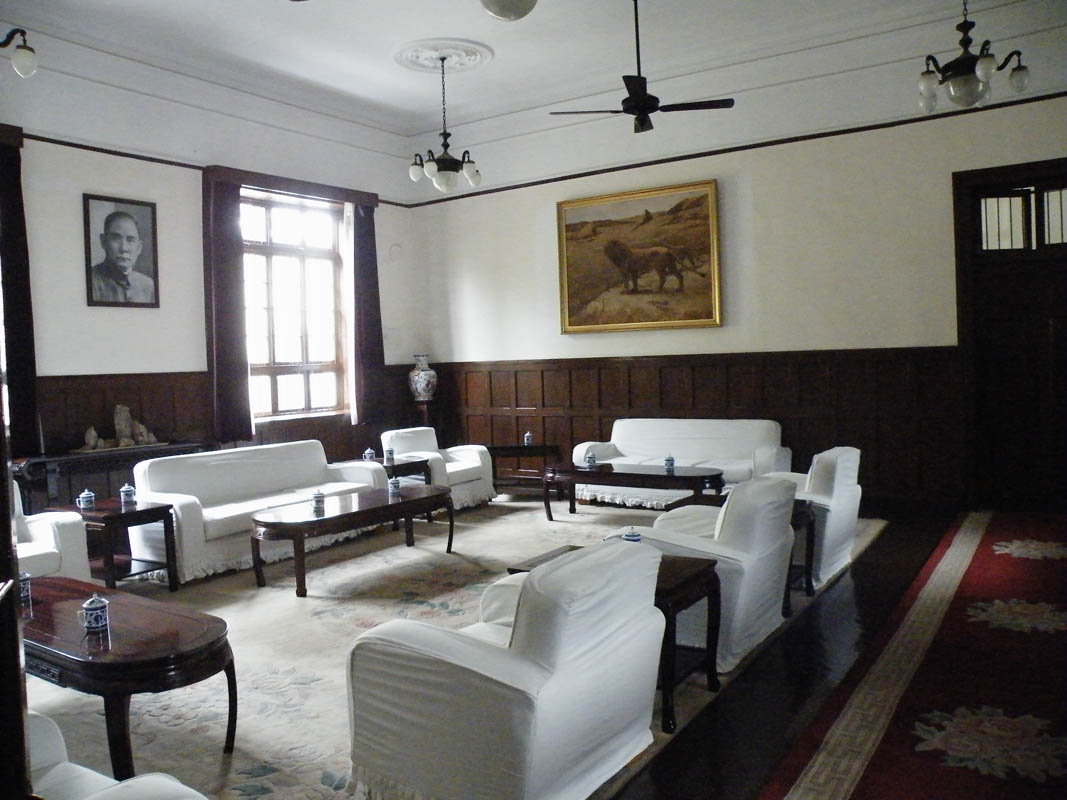
Reception Room in the reception hall

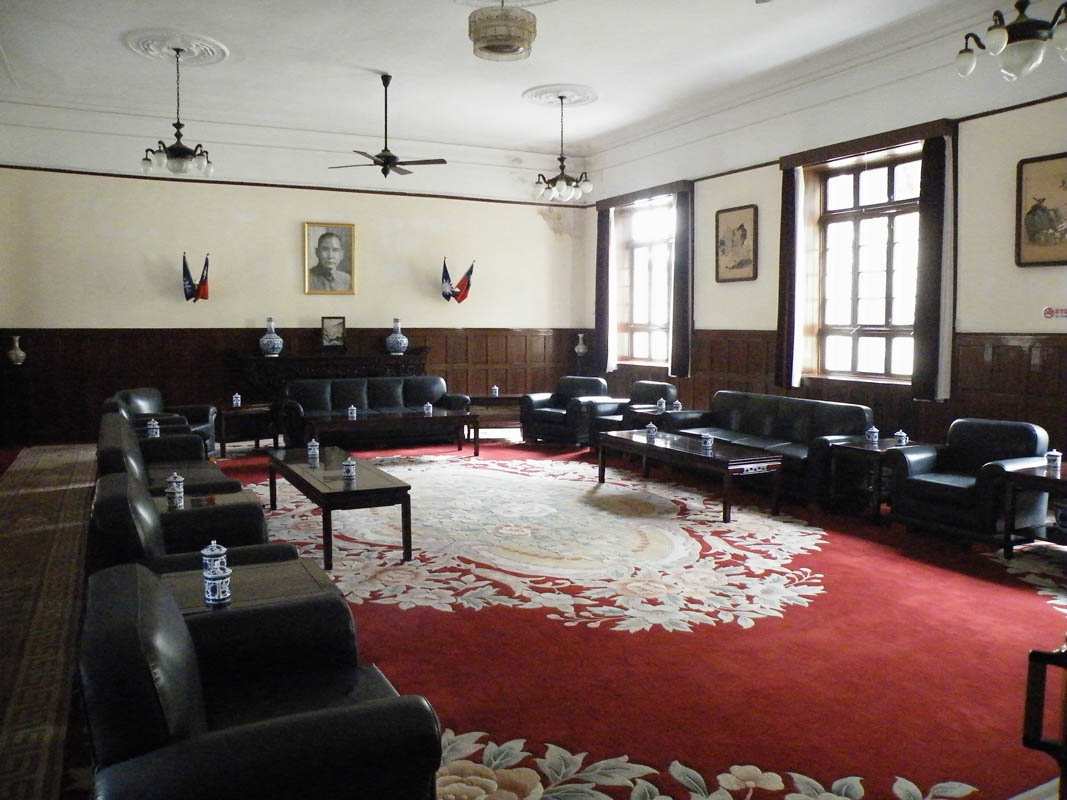
Foreign Guest Room in the reception hall

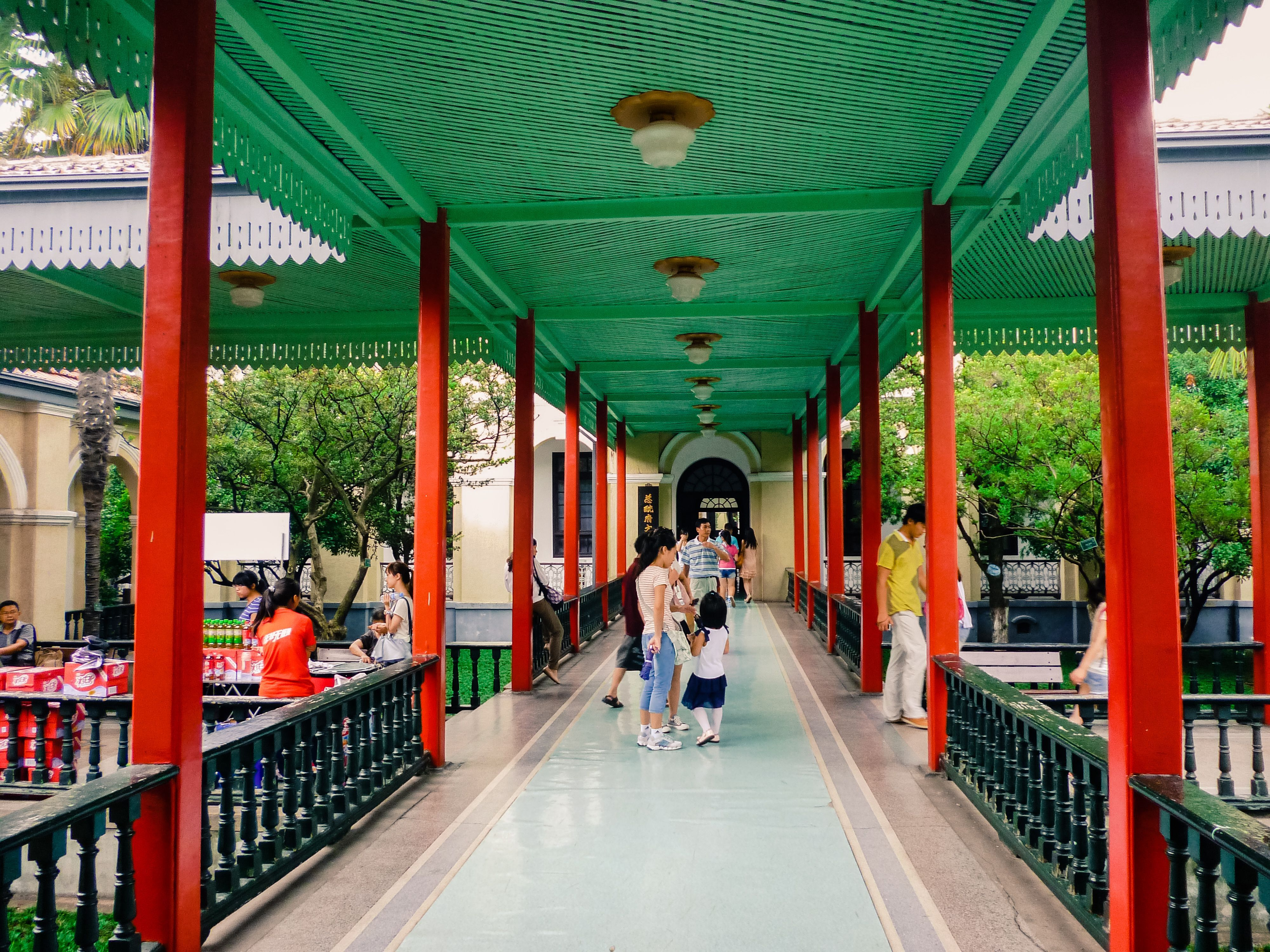
The aisle that leads to the House of Government Affairs

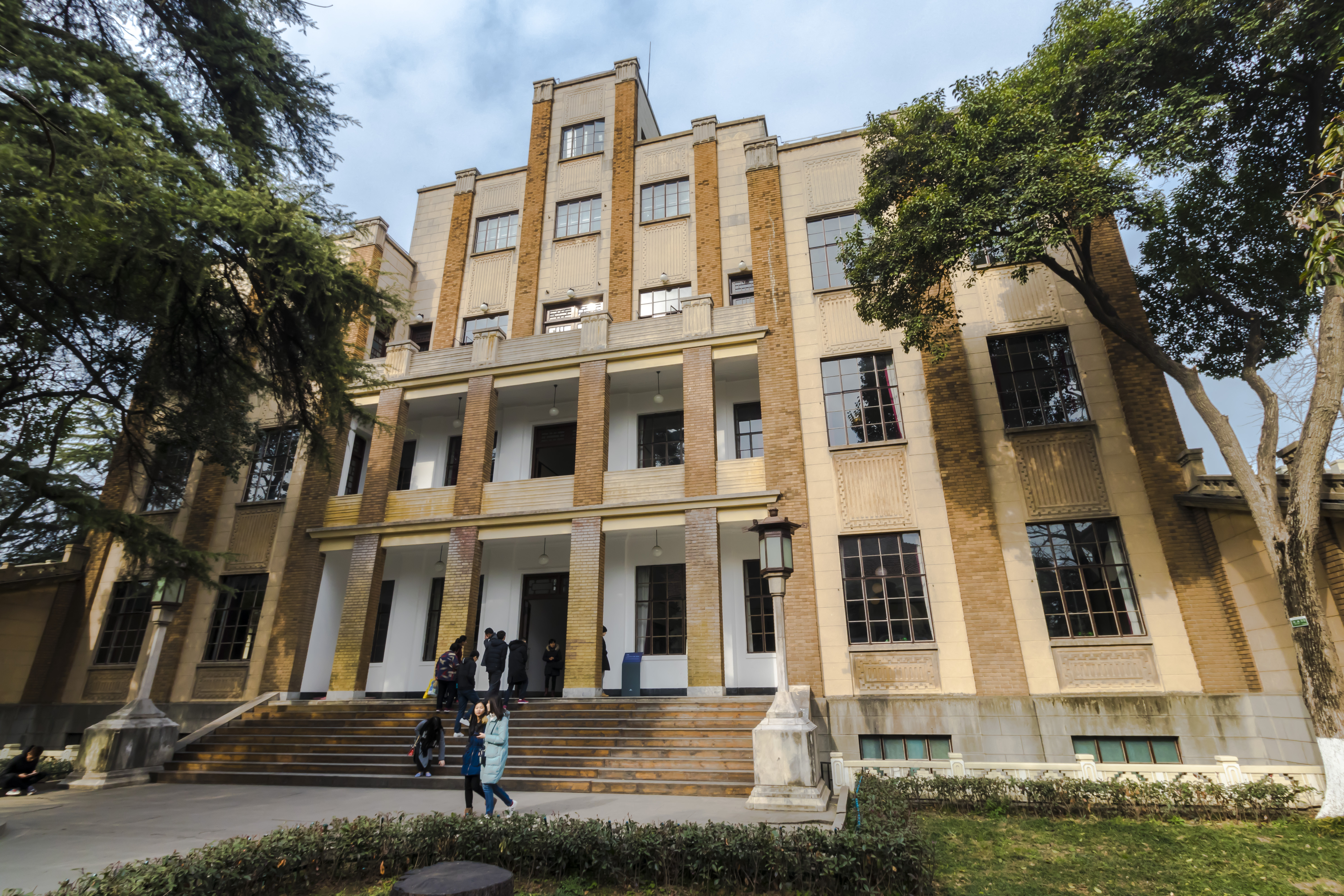
The Presidential Building

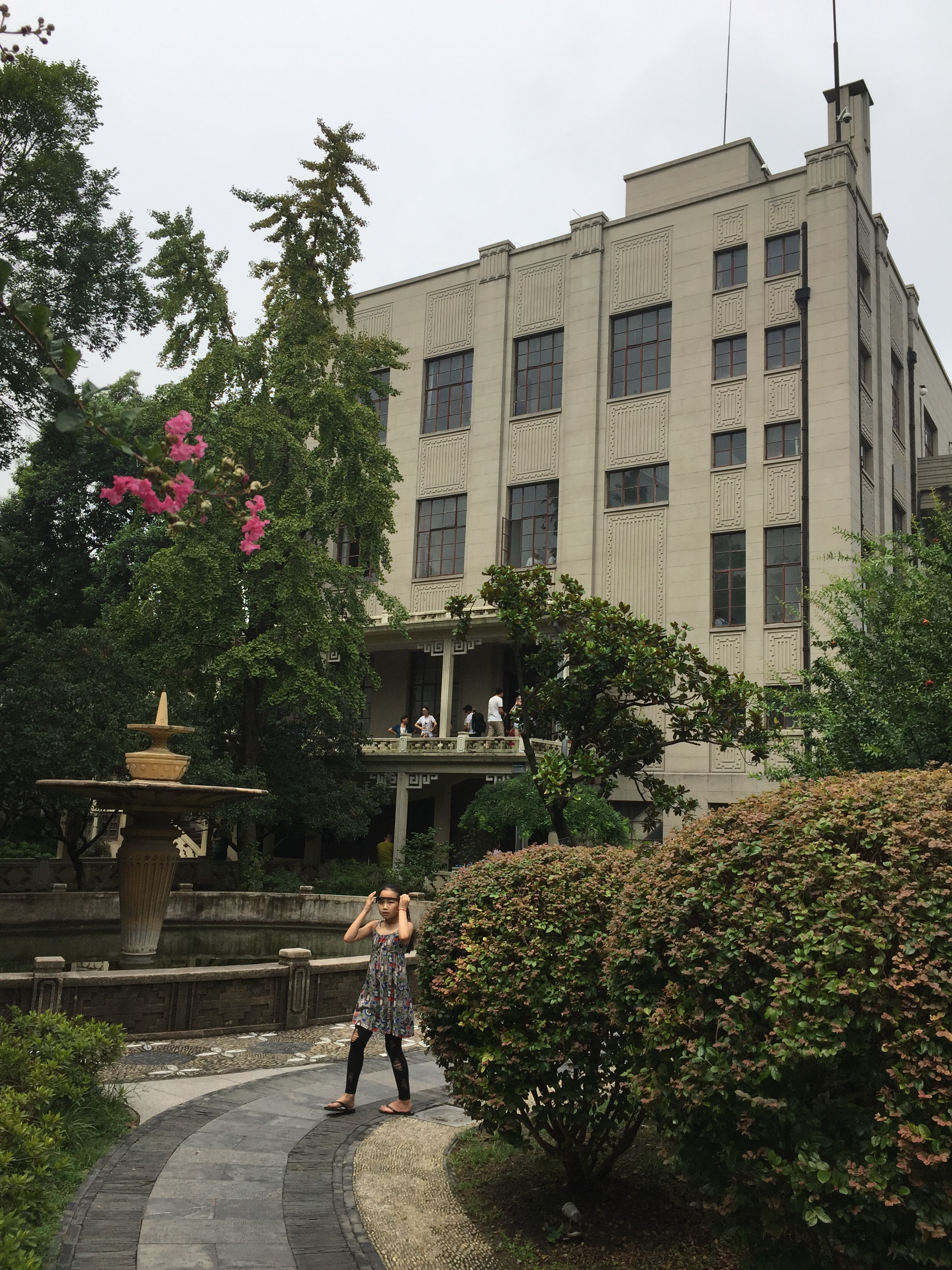
East facade of the Presidential Building with a fountain

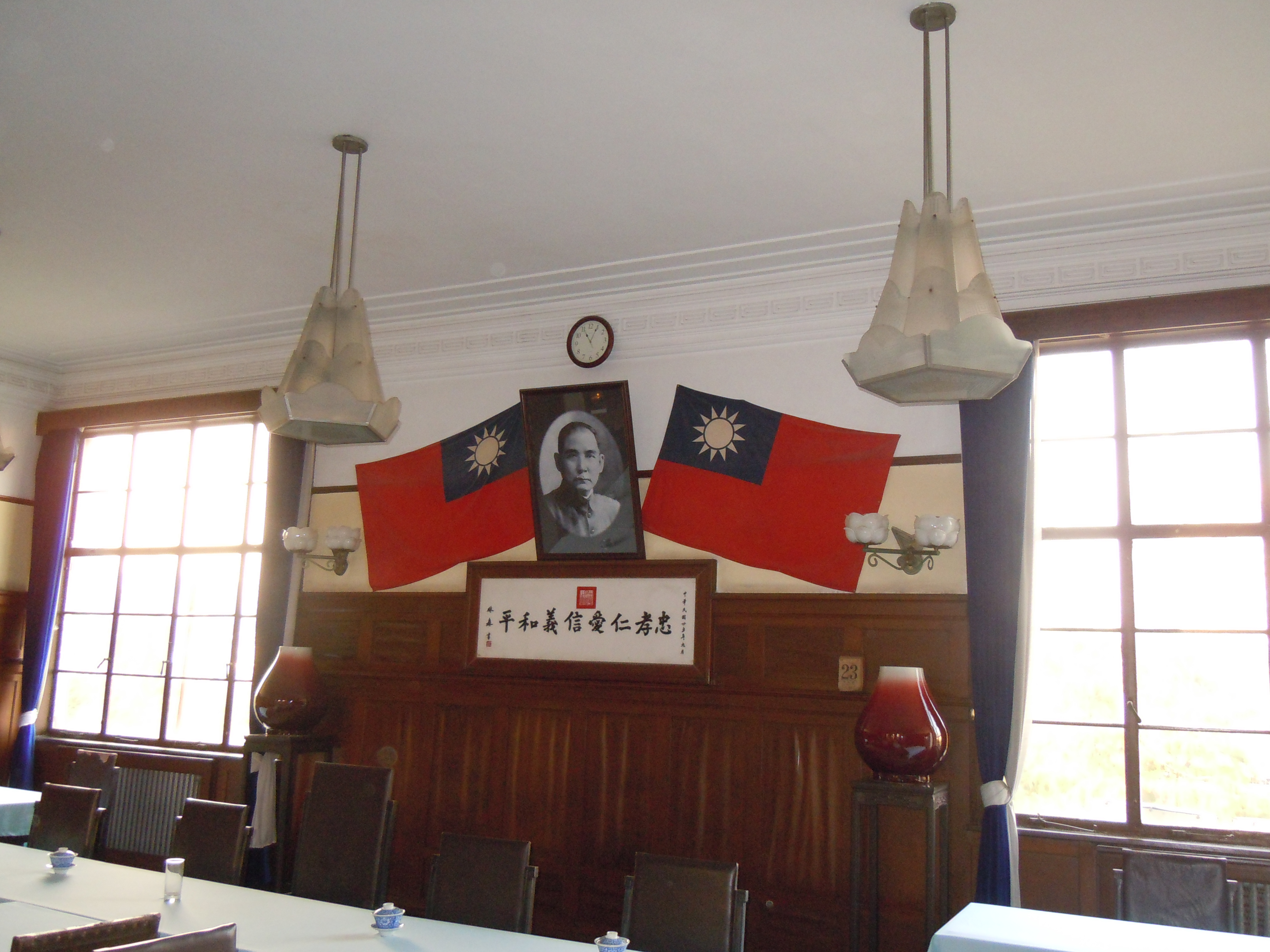
Meeting room of the State Affair Council in the Concrete House

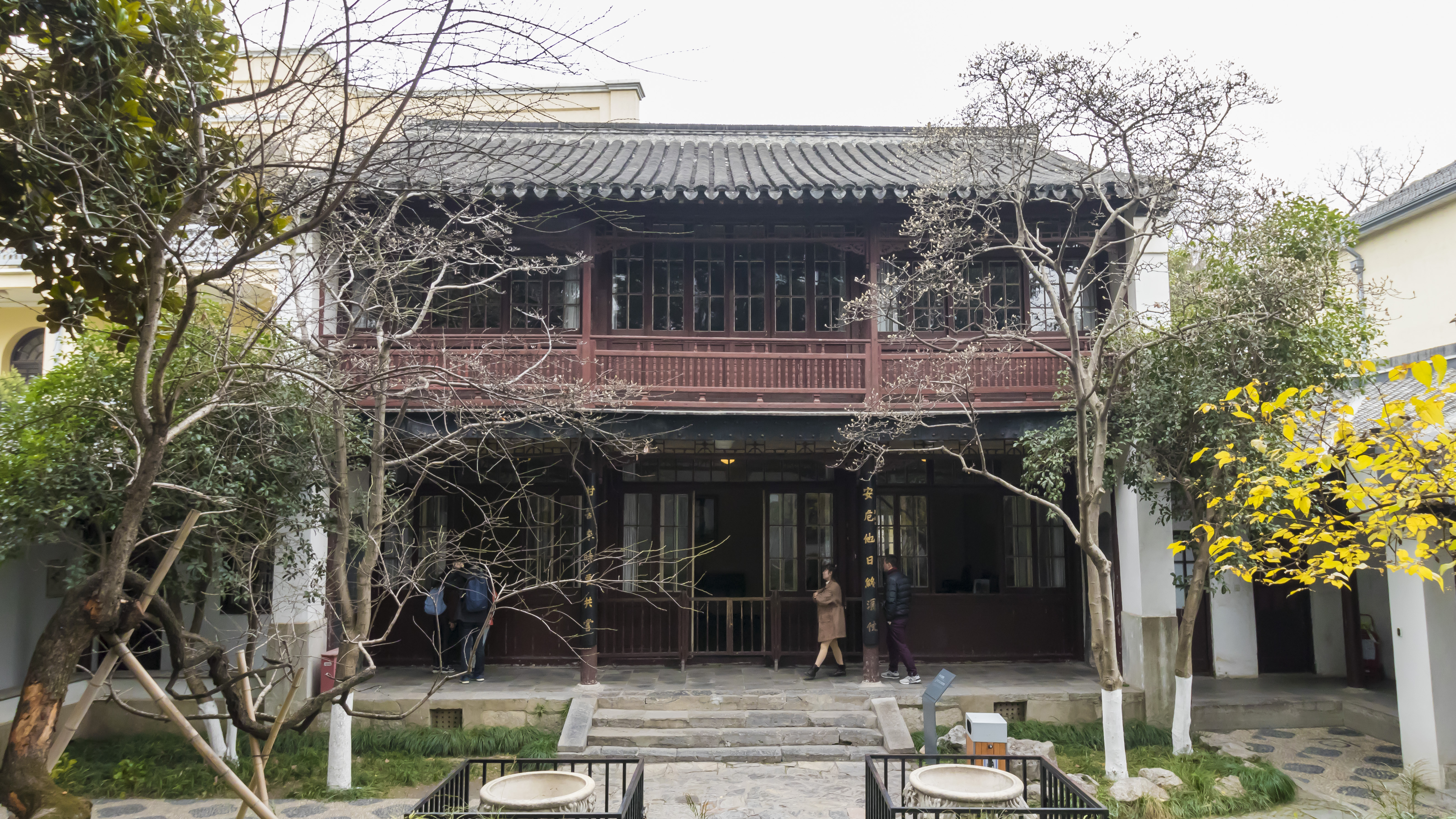
The Provisional Presidential Residence

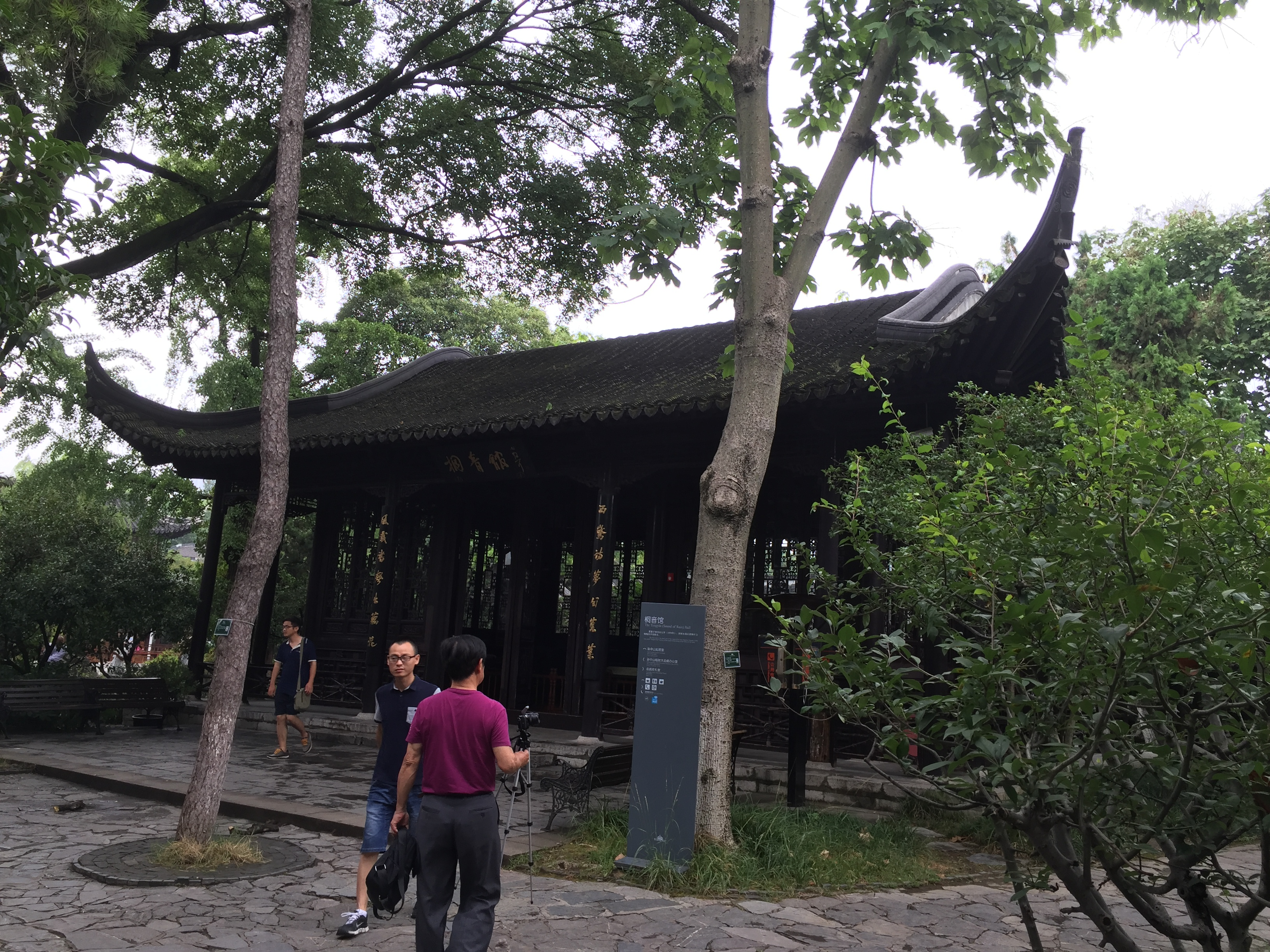
The Paulownia Melody House, one of the largest structures in the West Garden

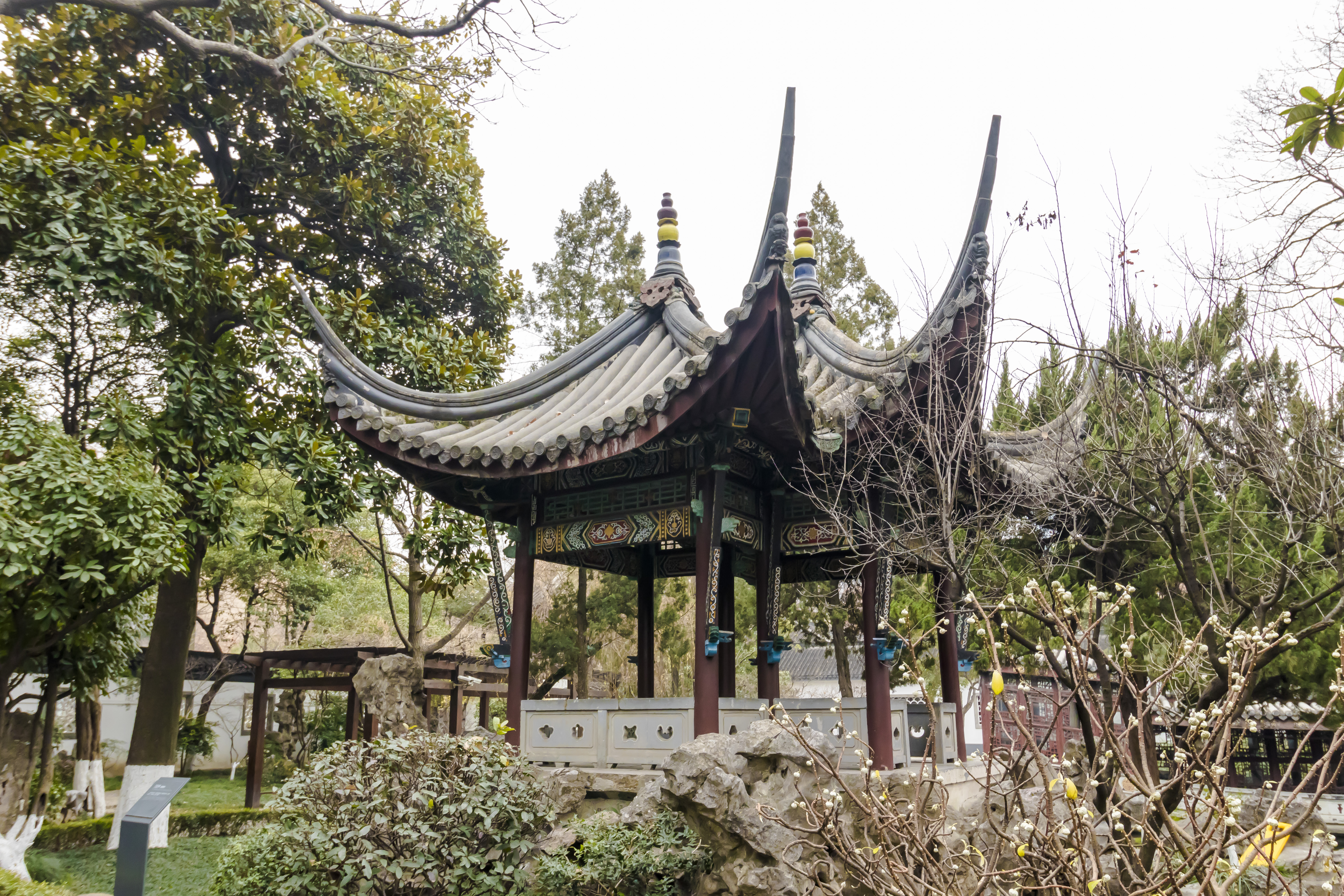
Mandarin Duck Pavilion

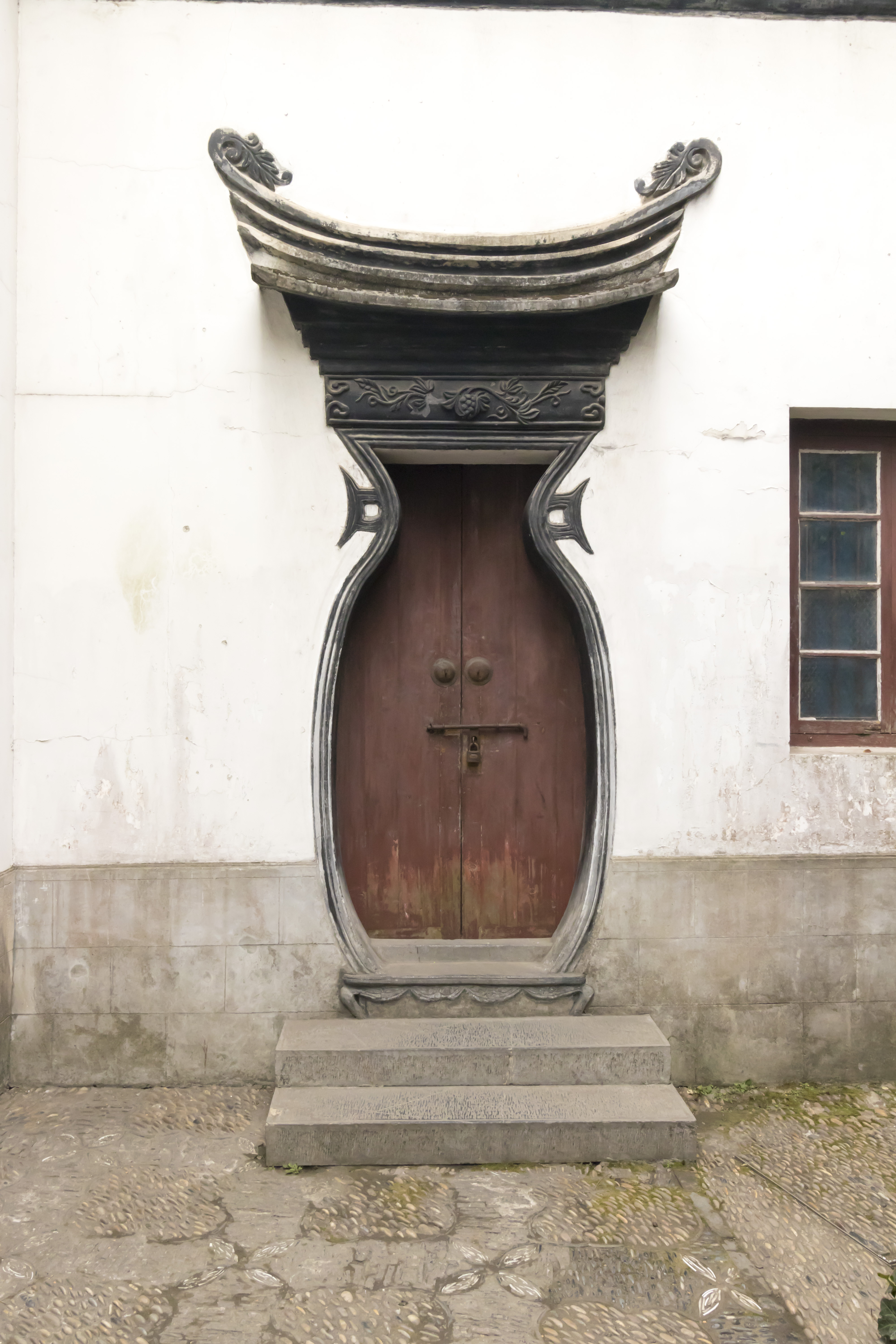
An entrance of Xu Garden

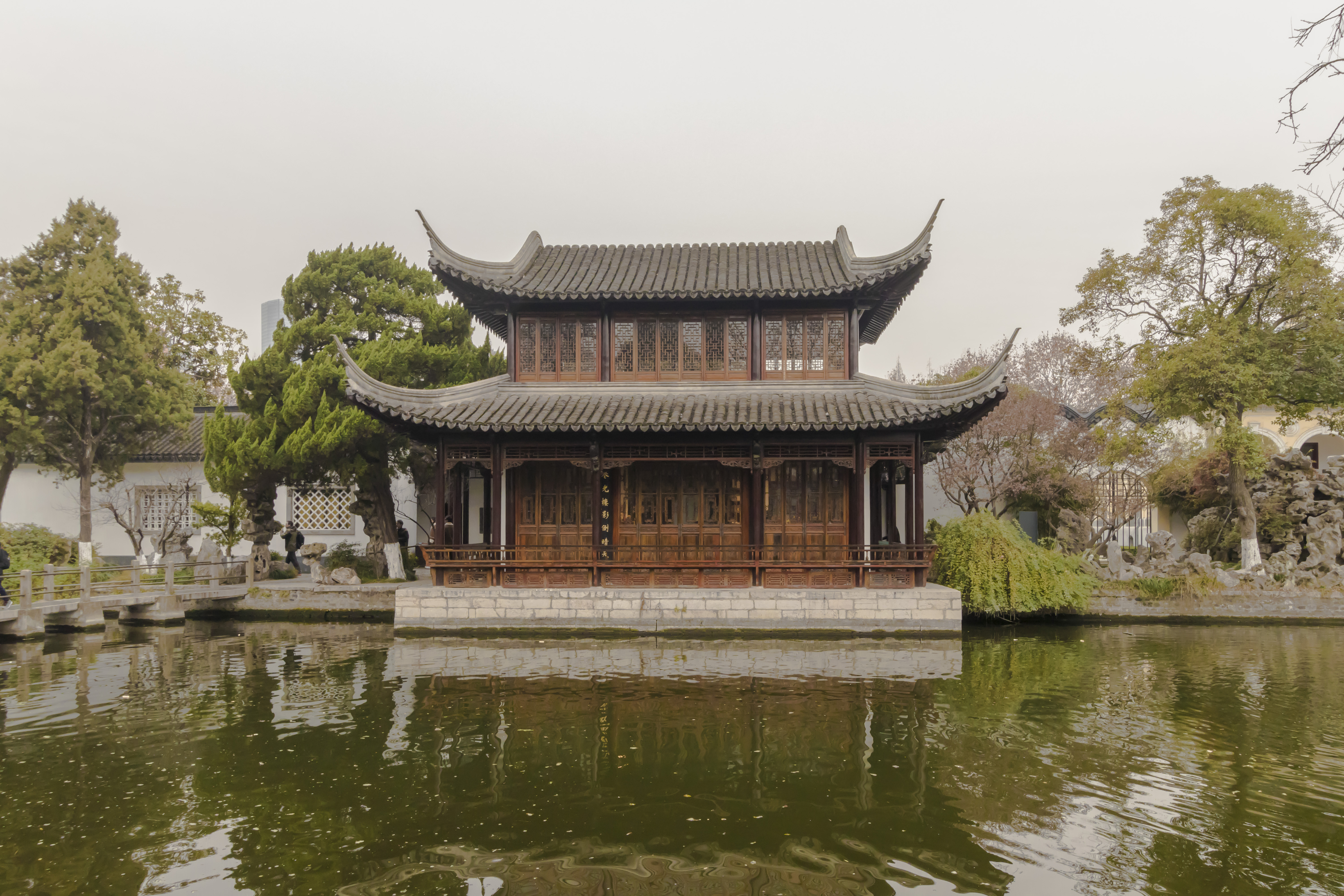
Tower of Beautiful Sunset

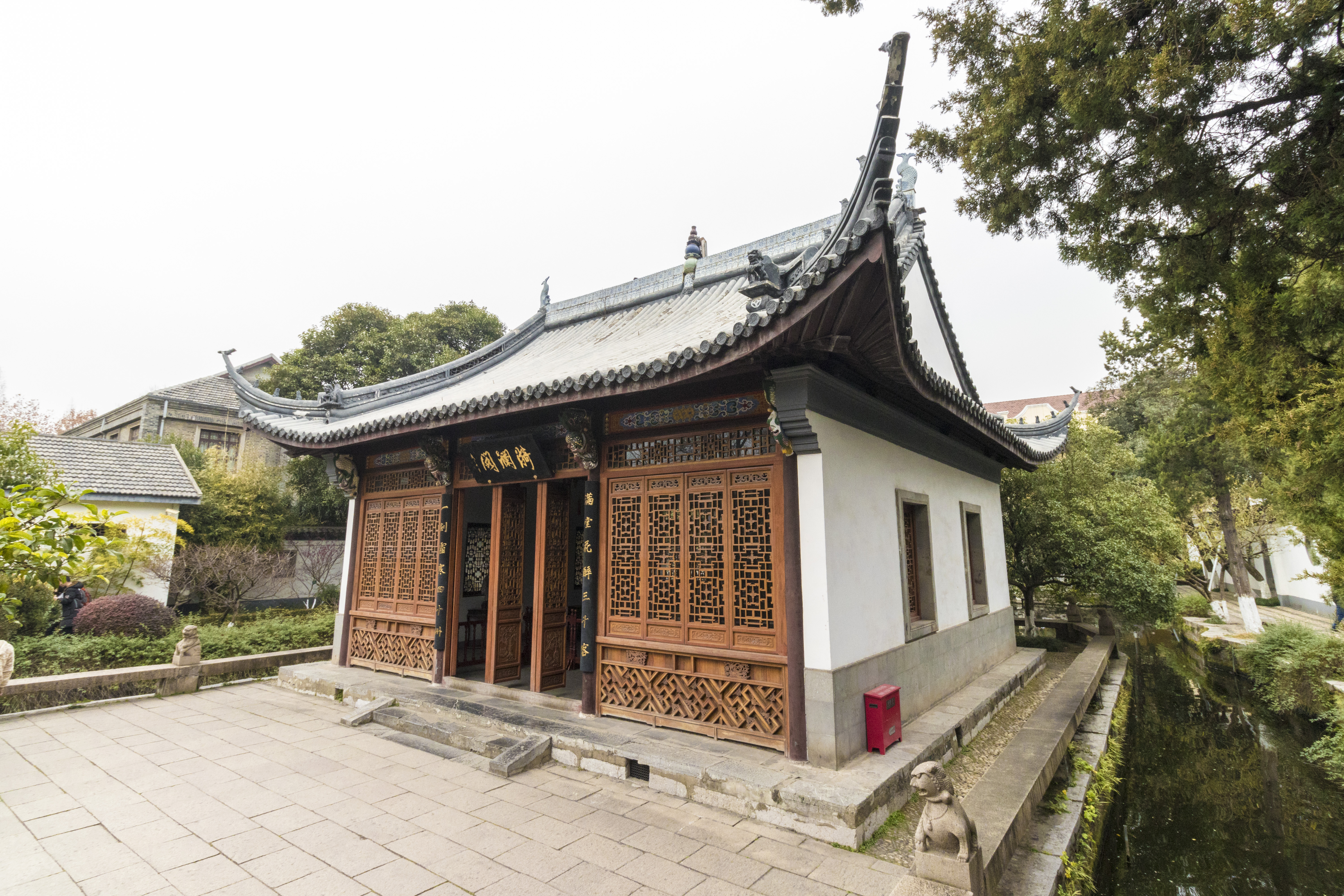
The Ripples Pavilion

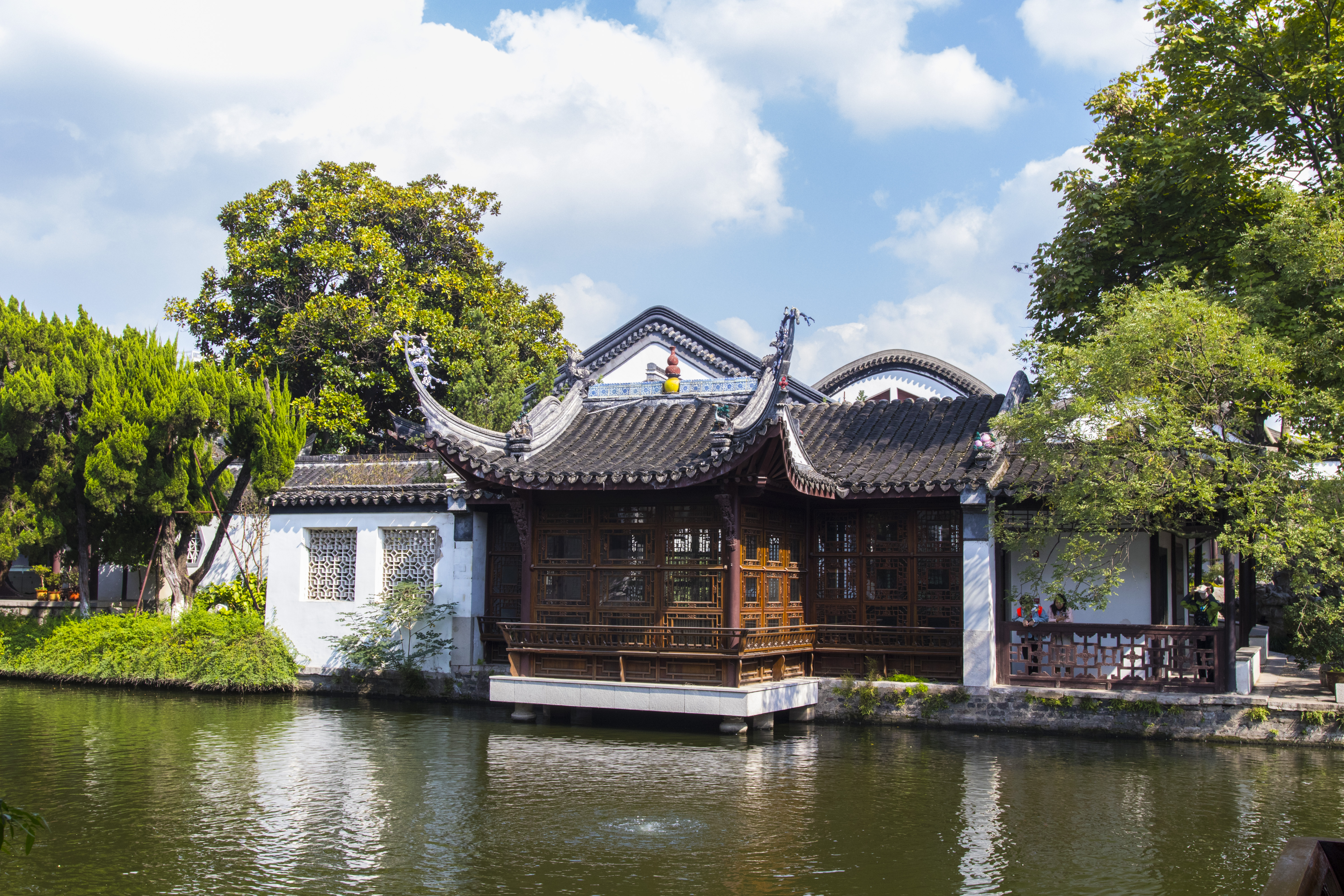
The Attic of Joy

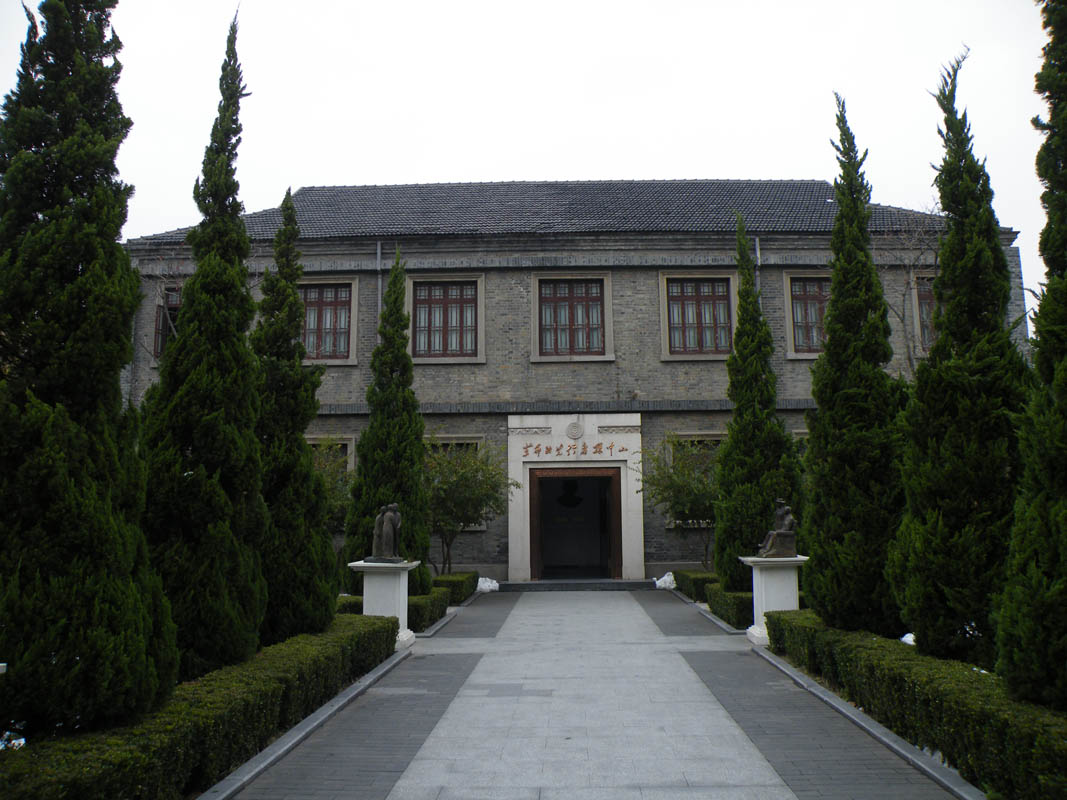
The General Staff House

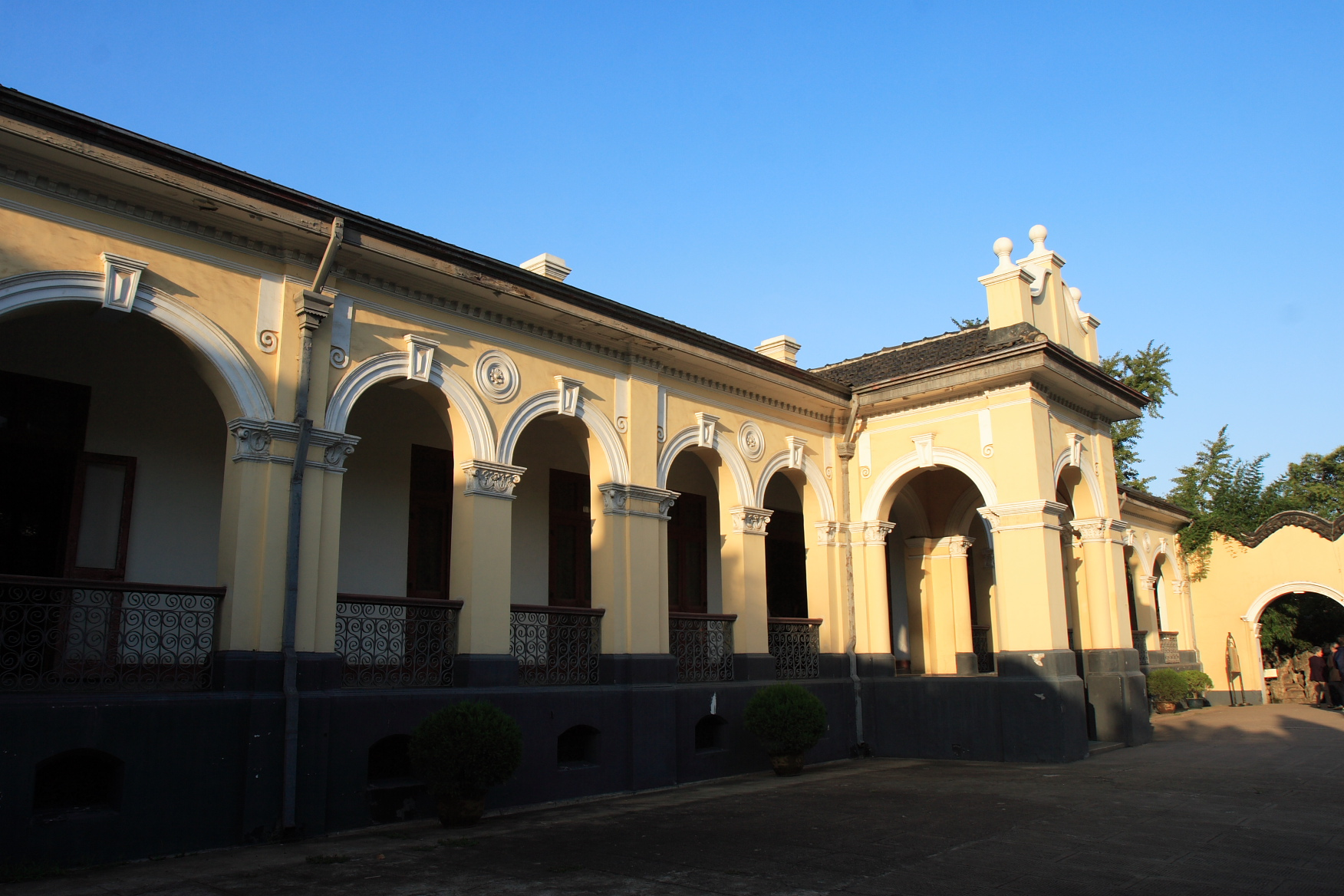
South facade of the Commission House, aka the West Garden Hall

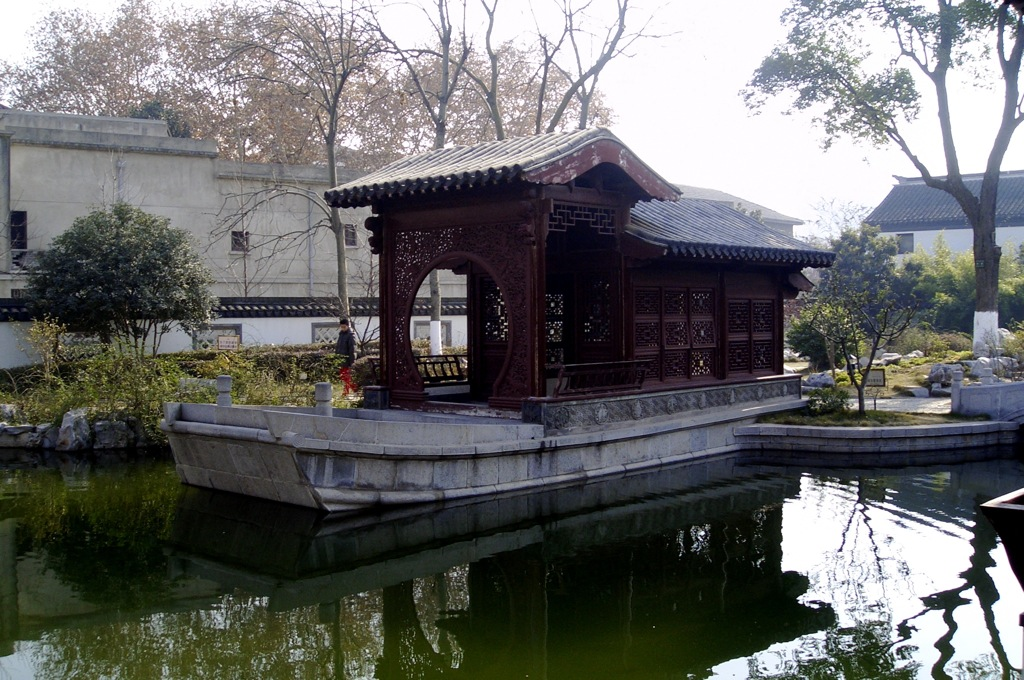
A smaller marble boat in the East Garden

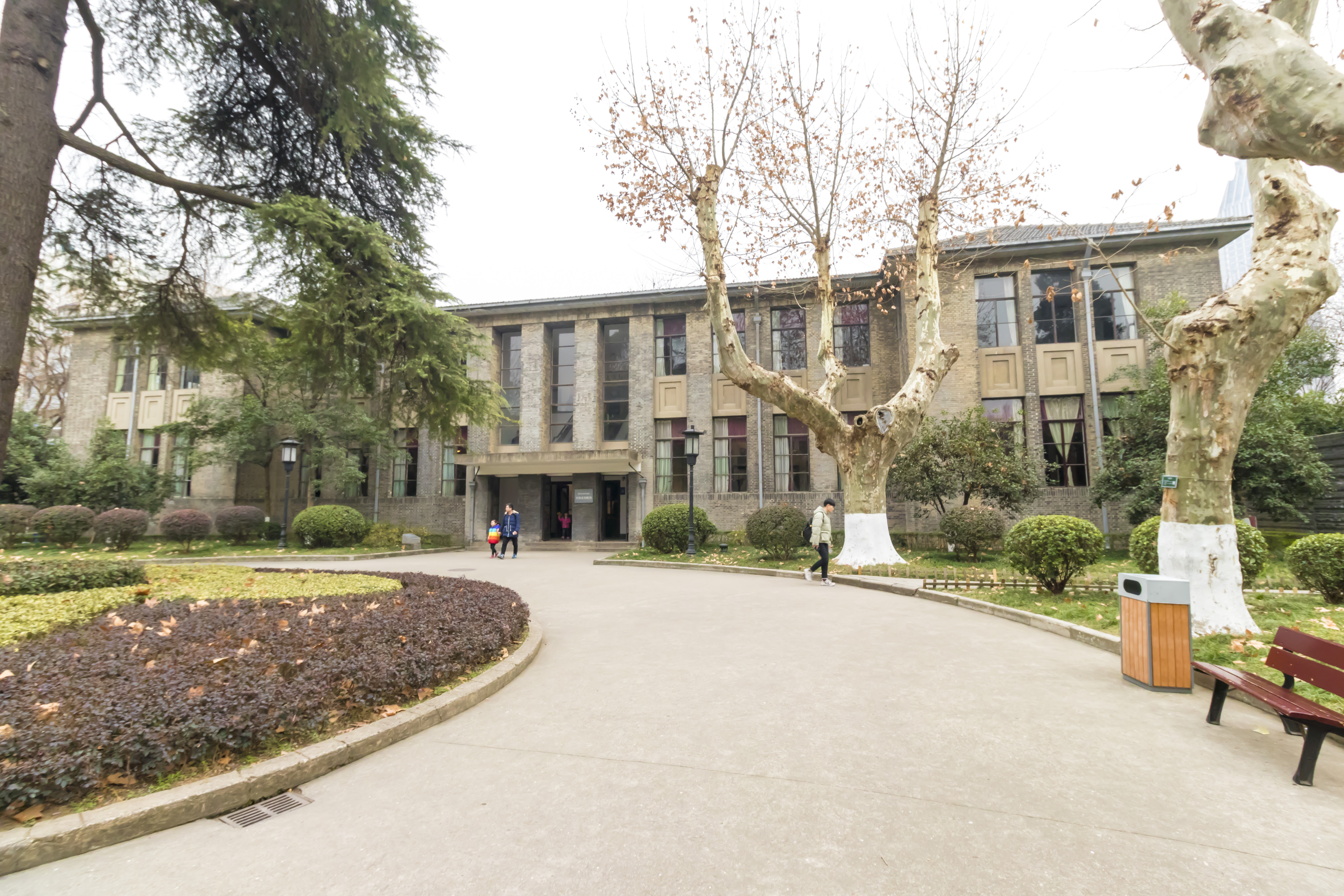
South Executive House

== See also ==
- List of museums in China
- Ming Palace
- Zhongnanhai
- Presidential Office Building, Taipei
- Meiling Palace
