= List of Nanjing Metro stations =

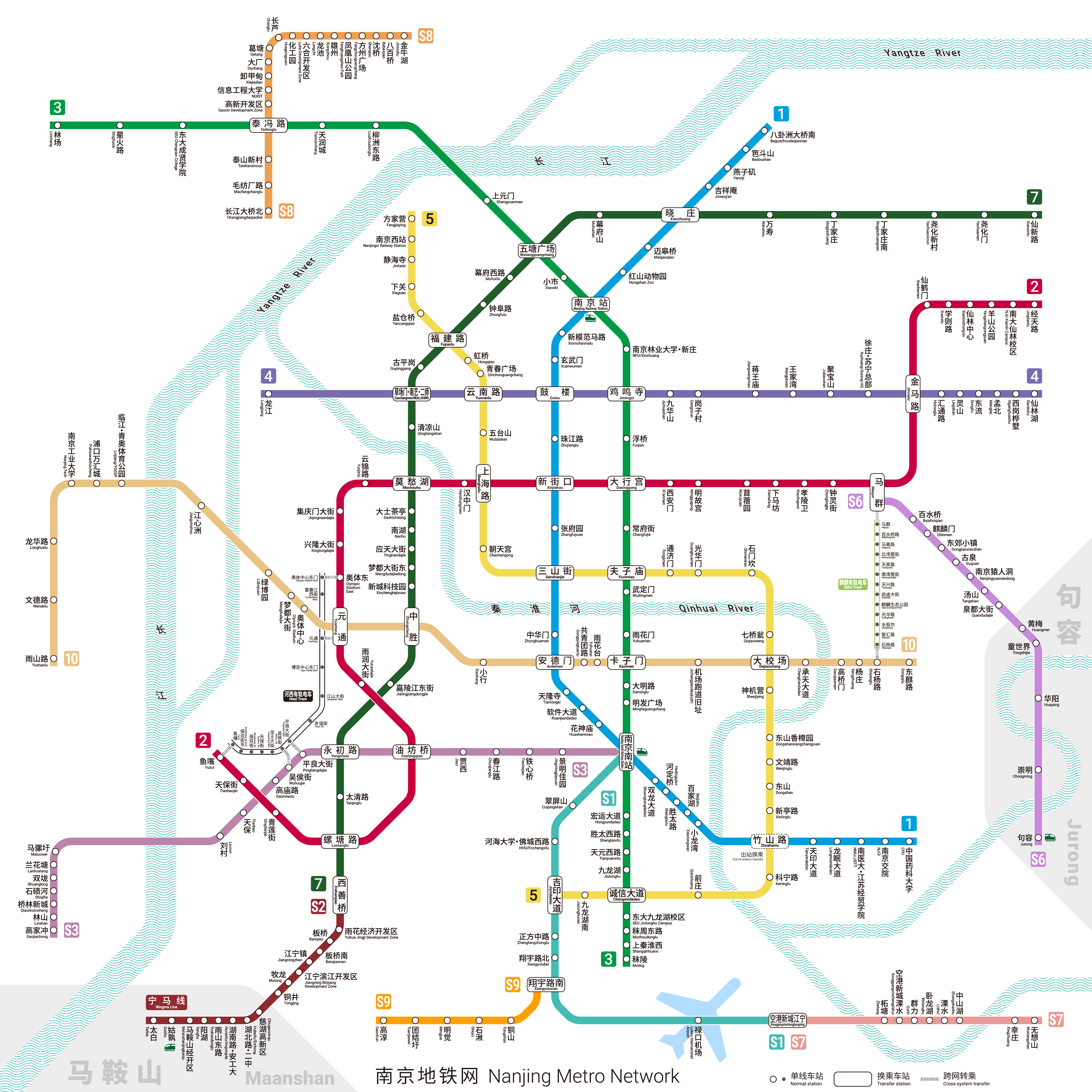
A map of Nanjing metro lines currently in operation. Note that Line S4 is not included on the map.

The Nanjing Metro is a rapid transit system serving Nanjing, the capital of Jiangsu province, with stations in all of the city's eleven districts. It is constructed, maintained, and operated by the Nanjing Metro Group Company. The results of Nanjing's 2015 Municipal Bureau of Statistics count showed that Nanjing Metro carried a total of 720 million rides that year.

The idea for a metro system in Nanjing was first proposed in 1984 in the Nanjing Municipal People's Congress as a way to ease traffic concerns. An underground alignment was preferred in order to "protect the historical city's monuments and walls". Over the next few years, the city hired researchers and engineers to plan the system and to study existing metros like Hong Kong's MTR. In 1992, construction began on an experimental station in what would later become Sanshanjie station. In 1999, following the successful completion of the station's experimental phase, Nanjing became the fifth city after Beijing, Shanghai, Guangzhou, and Shenzhen to receive approval from the National Development and Reform Commission to begin work on a subway. Roughly one year later in December, construction on the initial 21.7 km (13.5 mi) line of the system broke ground.

The system spans 658.1 km (408.9 mi) and has 272 stations, divided between urban line stations and S-train line stations.^{[a]} There are 30 transfer stations, Andemen, Caochangmen/NAU/JSSNU, Chengxindadao, Dajiaochang, Daxinggong, Fujianlu, Fuzimiao, Gulou, Jimingsi, Jinmalu, Jiyindadao, Konggangxinchengjiangning, Luotanglu, Maqun, Mochouhu, Sanshanjie, Shanghailu, Taifenglu, Wutangguangchang, Xiangyulunan, Xiaozhuang, Xinjiekou, Yongchulu, Youfangqiao, Yuantong, Yunnanlu, Zhongsheng, Zhushanlu, Nanjing Railway Station, and Nanjing South Railway Station, with the latter two also connecting to China's nationwide conventional rail and high-speed rail network. An additional two stations (Yuantong and Olympic Stadium East) connect to the Hexi tram and one (Lukou International Airport Station) serves the city's international airport. Systemwide, service begins every morning with the earliest train scheduled to depart Yushanlu station on Line 10 at 5:40 a.m. and concludes with the final train scheduled to arrive at Maigaoqiao Station on Line 1 just after 12:27 a.m. the next morning.

== Lines ==
Line	Termini (District)		Opening	Newest extension	Length	Stations
Line 1 (Nanjing Metro)	Baguazhoudaqiaonan (Qixia)	CPU (Jiangning)	3 September 2005	28 December 2022	45.4 km (28.2 mi)	32
Line 2 (Nanjing Metro)	Yuzui (Jianye)	Jingtianlu (Qixia)	28 May 2010	28 December 2021	43.6 km (27.1 mi)	30
Line 3 (Nanjing Metro)	Linchang (Pukou)	Moling (Jiangning)	1 April 2015	19 December 2025	48.2 km (30.0 mi)	31
Line 4 (Nanjing Metro)	Longjiang (Gulou)	Xianlinhu (Qixia)	18 January 2017	n/a	33.8 km (21.0 mi)	18
Line 5 (Nanjing Metro)	Jiyindadao (Jiangning)	Fangjiaying (Jiangning)	31 March 2024	6 August 2025	36.9 km (22.9 mi)	30
Line 6 (Nanjing Metro)	Qixiashan (Qixia)	Nanjing South Railway Station (Yuhuatai)	29 September 2026	n/a	32.4 km (20.1 mi)	19
Line 7 (Nanjing Metro)	Xianxinlu (Qixia)	Xishanqiao (Yuhuatai)	28 December 2022	28 December 2024	35.7 km (22.2 mi)	27
Line 10 (Nanjing Metro)	Dongqilu (Jiangning)	Yushanlu (Pukou)	1 July 2014	19 December 2025	34.9 km (21.7 mi)	24
Line S1 (Nanjing Metro)	Nanjing South Railway Station (Yuhuatai)	Konggangxinchengjiangning (Jiangning)	1 July 2014	26 May 2018	36.3 km (22.6 mi)	9
Line S2 (Nanjing Metro)	Xishanqiao (Yuhuatai)	Taibai (Dangtu, Anhui)	22 April 2026	n/a	54.23 km (33.70 mi)	16
Line S3 (Nanjing Metro)	Nanjing South Railway Station (Yuhuatai)	Gaojiachong (Pukou)	6 December 2017	n/a	36.3 km (22.6 mi)	19
( S4 )	Chahe (Chuzhou)	Chuzhou Railway Station (Chuzhou)	28 June 2023	n/a	46.2 km (28.7 mi)	10
Line S6 (Nanjing Metro)	Maqun (Qixia)	Jurong (Jurong)	28 December 2021	n/a	43.6 km (27.1 mi)	13
Line S7 (Nanjing Metro)	Konggangxinchengjiangning (Jiangning)	Wuxiangshan (Lishui)	26 May 2018	n/a	28.8 km (17.9 mi)	9
Line S8 (Nanjing Metro)	Changjiangdaqiaobei (Pukou)	Jinniuhu (Luhe)	1 August 2014	30 September 2022	47.3 km (29.4 mi)	19
Line S9 (Nanjing Metro)	Xiangyulunan (Jiangning)	Gaochun (Gaochun)	30 December 2017	n/a	52.4 km (32.6 mi)	6
Total					658.1 km (408.9 mi)	272^{[a]}

- ^{a} Interchange stations are counted only once.

Line 1 is the first operating line in the Nanjing Metro system. The initial north–south 21.7 km (13.5 mi) segment became operational on September 3, 2005, serving 16 stops between Maigaoqiao and Olympic Stadium stations. In 2010, a 12-station, 18 km (11 mi) southward extension of Line 1 opened, forking the line at Andemen station; four years later, an extended western fork broke away and became Line 10. Shortly after the southern extension of Line 1 was completed, a second, east–west oriented line opened for service. While originally planned to open in phases, all 26 stations of Line 2 opened simultaneously in May 2010. That same year, groundbreaking work began for Line 3, which opened in 2015 with 29 stations. Phase one of Line 4 opened two years later in January 2017, with 18 stations spanning a length of 33.8 km (21.0 mi). As of Line 4's opening, there is just under 177 km (110 mi) of urban metro lines in operation.

The Nanjing Metro also operates eight S-train branded suburban metro lines: Line S1 (or the Nanjing–Gaochun Intercity Railway Phase I), Line S2 (or the Nanjing-Ma'anshan intercity railway), Line S3 (or the Nanjing–He County Intercity Railway), Line S4 (or the Nanjing–Chuzhou Intercity Railway), Line S6 (or the Nanjing–Jurong intercity railway), Line S7 (or the Nanjing–Lishui Intercity Railway), Line S8 (or the Nanjing–Tianchang Intercity Railway), and Line S9 (or the Nanjing–Gaochun Intercity Railway Phase II). The 35.8 km (22.2 mi) Line S1 opened in 2014 ahead of the Nanjing 2014 Summer Youth Olympics, and connected Lukou International Airport with the rest of the metro system. Line S8 opened soon after, connecting suburban Luhe District with the metro network, with plans to eventually extend to neighboring Anhui Province. Line S3 opened in late 2017, and is the third line to cross the Yangtze River. Lines S7 and S9, respectively connecting the far southern districts of Lishui and Gaochun to Line S1, opened on May 26, 2018 and December 30, 2017, respectively. Line S6 opened in December 2021, extending the Nanjing Metro system outside of Nanjing city limits for the first time. These eight lines collectively consist of 380.03 km (236.14 mi).

== Stations ==
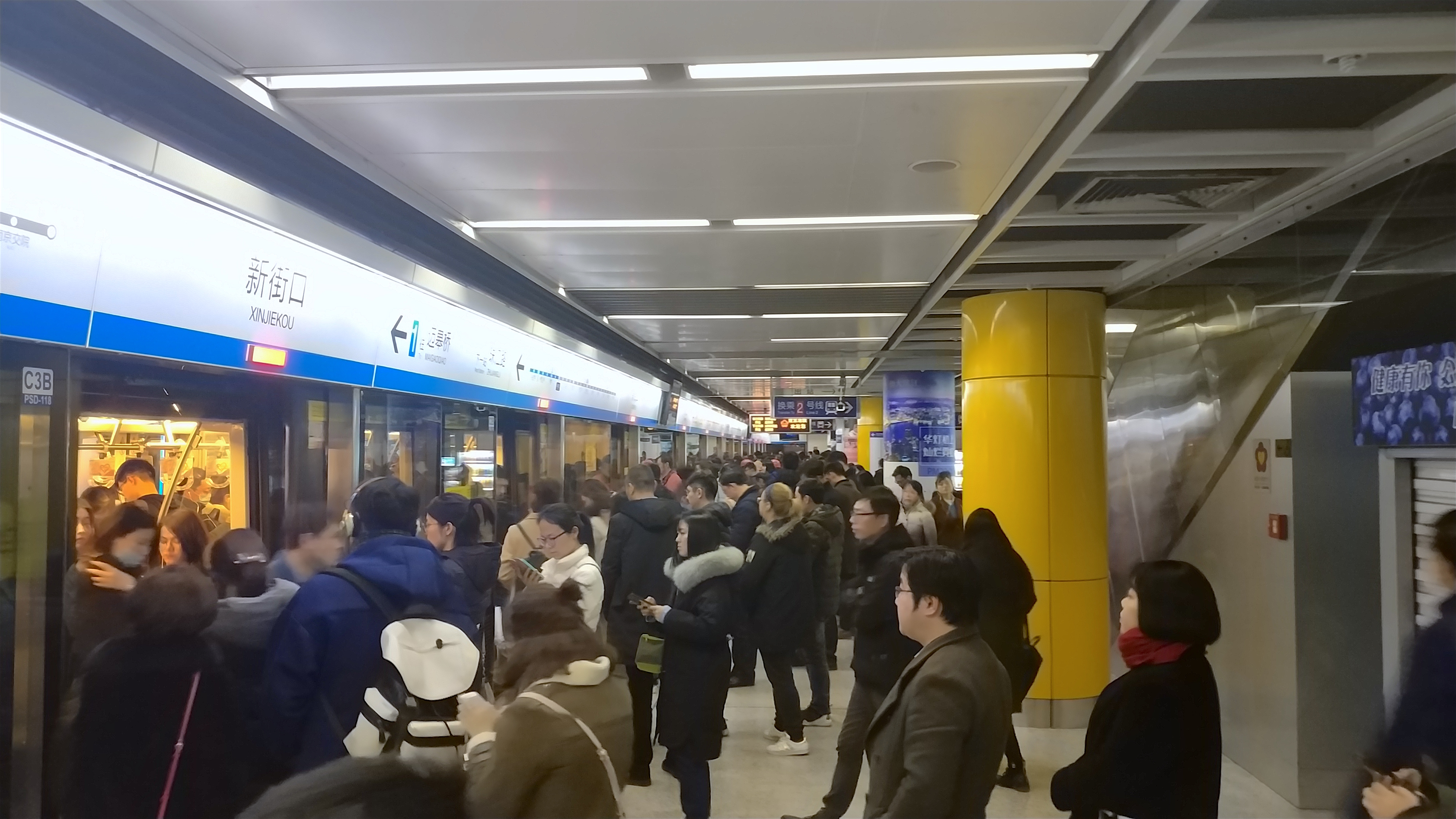
The Line 1 platform of Xinjiekou station, the busiest station in the Nanjing Metro system

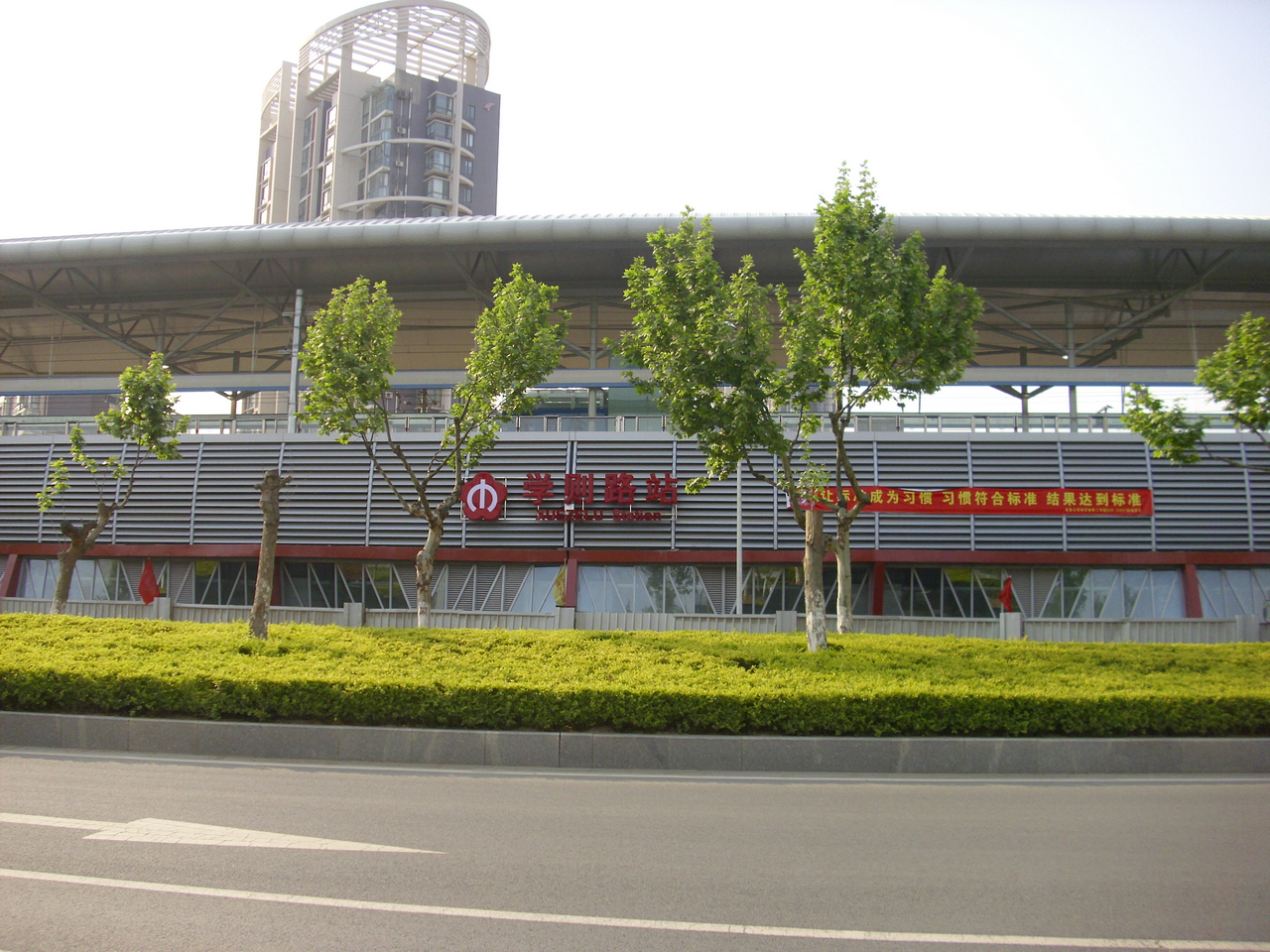
Certain stations are elevated, such as the Xuezelu Station pictured here.

The Nanjing Metro operates 175 stations across nine lines, with 118 stations on the system's five urban lines and 73 along its six S-lines.^{[a]} Among these are transfer stations to China's high-speed rail and conventional passenger rail network, as well as Nanjing's tramway and international airport. Additionally, the metro's expansion plans consist of one urban rail and three suburban rail lines opening within the next five years, expanding the system by an additional 64 stations, with transfer stations counted once per line.

The system's largest and busiest station is Xinjiekou, the transfer station between Lines 1 and 2, with 24 officially marked exits and a floor dedicated to retail and commercial activities. Xinjiekou attracted 158,200 passengers on New Year's Eve in 2015 and 130,500 daily passengers in 2016 during China's week-long National Day holiday. The metro stations in Nanjing South Railway Station and Nanjing Railway Station carried 102,000 and 99,800 daily riders respectively during the same holiday period. Other high-ridership stations include Daxinggong, Sanshanjie, Fuzimiao, Gulou, and Xiamafang.

=== Key ===
^	Transfer stations
†	Line termini
^†	Transfer stations/Line termini
tram interchange	Interchange with the Nanjing Trams
^	Transfer stations/Interchange with the Nanjing Trams
†	Line Termini/Interchange with the Nanjing Trams
^†	Line Termini/Transfer stations/Interchange with the Nanjing Trams
^	Transfer stations/Interchange with CRH
Airport interchange	Transfer stations at Lukou International Airport
^†	Transfer stations/Line termini/Interchange with CRH

=== In operation ===
Line(s)	Station name English	Station name Mandarin	Platform location	District/City^{[e]}
1 10	Andemen^	安德门	Elevated, Underground^{[b]}	Yuhuatai
S8	Babaiqiao	八百桥	Elevated	Luhe
1	Badoushan	笆斗山	Underground	Qixia
1	Baguazhoudaqiaonan†	八卦洲大桥南	Underground	Qixia
1	Baijiahu	百家湖	Underground	Jiangning
S2	Banqiao	板桥	Underground	Yuhuatai
S2	Banqiaonan	板桥南	Underground	Yuhuatai
4 7	Caochangmen/NAU/JSSNU^	草场门·南艺·二师	Underground	Gulou
S4	Chahe†	汊河	Elevated	Chuzhou
S4	Chahexincheng	汊河新城	Elevated	Chuzhou
3	Changfujie	常府街	Underground	Qinhuai
S8	Changjiangdaqiaobei†	长江大桥北	Underground	Pukou
S8	Changlu	长芦	Elevated	Luhe
5	Chaotiangong	朝天宫	Underground	Qinhuai
10	Chengtiandadao	承天大道	Underground	Qinhuai
3 5	Chengxindadao^	诚信大道	Underground	Jiangning
1	China Pharmaceutical University†	中国药科大学	Elevated	Jiangning
S6	Chongming	崇明	Underground	Jurong
3	Chunjianglu	常府街	Underground	Yuhuatai
S4	Chuzhou Government Affairs Center	滁州政务中心	Underground	Chuzhou
S4	Chuzhou Railway Station†	滁州高铁站	Elevated	Chuzhou
S2	Cihugaoxinqu	慈湖高新区	Elevated	Ma'anshan
S1	Cuipingshan	翠屏山	Underground	Jiangning
S8	Dachang	大厂	Elevated	Luhe
5 10	Dajiaochang^	大校场	Underground	Qinhuai
3	Daminglu	大明路	Underground	Qinhuai
7	Dashichating	大士茶亭	Underground	Jianye
S4	Dawangying	大王郢	Elevated	Chuzhou
2 3	Daxinggong^	大行宫	Underground	Xuanwu
7	Dingjiazhuang	丁家庄	Underground	Qixia
7	Dingjiazhuangnan	丁家庄南	Underground	Qixia
S6	Dongjiaoxiaozhen	东郊小镇	Elevated	Jiangning
4	Dongliu	东流	Underground	Jiangning
10	Dongqilu†	东麒路	Underground	Jiangning
5	Dongshan	东山	Underground	Jiangning
5	Dongshanxiangzhangyuan	东山香樟园	Underground	Jiangning
5	Fangjiaying†	方家营	Underground	Gulou
S8	Fangzhouguangchang	方州广场	Underground	Luhe
S8	Fenghuangshangongyuan	凤凰山公园	Underground	Luhe
6	Fuguishan	富贵山	Underground	Xuanwu
5 7	Fujianlu^	福建路	Underground	Gulou
3	Fuqiao	浮桥	Underground	Xuanwu
3 5	Fuzimiao^	夫子庙	Underground	Qinhuai
4 6	Gangzicun^	岗子村	Underground	Xuanwu
S9	Gaochun†	高淳	Elevated	Gaochun
S3	Gaojiachong†	高家冲	Elevated	Jianye
S3	Gaomiaolu	高庙路	Underground	Jianye
10	Gaoqiaomen	高桥门	Underground	Qinhuai
S8	Gaoxin Development Zone	高新开发区	Elevated	Pukou
S8	Getang	葛塘	Elevated	Luhe
10	Gongqingtuanlu	共青团路	Underground	Yuhuatai
5 6	Guanghuamen^	光华门	Underground	Qinhuai
1 4	Gulou^	鼓楼	Underground	Gulou
7	Gupinggang	古平岗	Underground	Gulou
S6	Guquan	古泉	Elevated	Jiangning
S2	Gushu†	姑孰	Elevated	Ma'anshan
2	Hanzhongmen	汉中门	Underground	Gulou/Qinhuai
1	Hedingqiao	河定桥	Underground	Jiangning
S1	Hohai University / Fochengxilu	河海大学·佛城西路	Underground	Jiangning
5	Hongqiao	虹桥	Underground	Gulou
6	Hongshanxincheng	红山新城	Underground	Xuanwu
1	Hongshan Zoo	红山动物园	Elevated	Xuanwu
3	Hongyundadao	宏运大道	Underground	Jiangning
S4	Huaboyuan	花博园	Elevated	Chuzhou
S8	Huagongyuan	化工园	Elevated	Luhe
S6	Huangmei	黄梅	Elevated	Jurong
1	Huashenmiao	花神庙	Underground	Yuhuatai
S6	Huayang	华阳	Elevated	Jurong
6	Huayuanlu	花园路	Underground	Xuanwu
S2	Hubeilu/Erzhong	湖北路·二中	Elevated	Ma'anshan
4	Huitonglu	汇通路	Underground	Qixia
S2	Hunanlu/Angongda	湖南路·安工大	Elevated	Ma'anshan
6	Jiagang	夹岗	Underground	Qinhuai
7	Jialingjiangdongjie	嘉陵江东街	Underground	Jiangning
S2	Jiangning Binjiang Development Zone	江宁滨江开发区	Elevated	Jiangning
S2	Jiangningzhen	江宁镇	Elevated	Jiangning
4	Jiangwangmiao	蒋王庙	Underground	Xuanwu
10	Jiangxinzhou	江心洲	Underground	Jianye
S3	Jiaxi	贾西	Underground	Jianye
6 10	Jichangpaodaojiuzhi^	机场跑道旧址	Underground	Qinhuai
3 4	Jimingsi^	鸡鸣寺	Underground	Xuanwu
S3	Jingmingjiayuan	景明佳园	Underground	Yuhuatai
2	Jingtianlu†	经天路	Elevated	Qixia
5	Jinhaisi	静海寺	Underground	Gulou
6	Jinlingshihua	金陵石化	Underground	Qixia
2 4	Jinmalu^	金马路	At-grade, Underground^{[c]}	Qixia
S8	Jinniuhu†	金牛湖	Elevated	Luhe
2	Jiqingmendajie	集庆门大街	Underground	Jiangning
4	Jiuhuashan	九华山	Underground	Xuanwu
3	Jiulonghu	九龙湖	Underground	Jiangning
5	Jiulonghunan	九龙湖南	Underground	Jiangning
1	Jixiang'an	吉祥庵	Underground	Qixia
5 S1	Jiyindadao^†	吉印大道	Underground	Jiangning
4	Jubaoshan	聚宝山	Underground	Xuanwu
S6	Jurong	句容	Underground	Jurong
3	Kazimen	卡子门	Underground	Qinhuai
5	Keninglu	科宁路	Underground	Jiangning
S1 S7	Konggangxinchengjiangning^†	空港新城江宁	Underground	Jiangning
S7	Konggangxinchenglishui	空港新城溧水	Elevated	Lishui
S4	Langyashan	琅琊山	Underground	Chuzhou
S3	Lanhuatang	兰花塘	Elevated	Pukou
3	Linchang†	林场	Elevated	Pukou
4	Lingshan	灵山	Underground	Jiangning
10	Linjiang / YOGSP	临江·青奥体育公园	Underground	Jianye
S4	Linlou	林楼	Elevated	Chuzhou
S3	Linshan	林山	Elevated	Pukou
S7	Lishui	溧水	Underground	Lishui
S3	Liucun	刘村	Elevated	Jianye
3	Liuzhoudonglu	柳州东路	Underground	Pukou
S8	Longchi	龙池	Underground	Luhe
10	Longhualu	龙华路	Underground	Pukou
4	Longjiang†	龙江	Underground	Gulou
1	Longmiandadao	龙眠大道	Elevated	Jiangning
10	Lüboyuan	绿博园	Underground	Jianye
S8	Luhe Development Zone	六合开发区	Elevated	Luhe
S1	Lukou International Airport	禄口机场	Underground	Jiangning
2 7	Luotanglu^	螺塘路	Underground	Jianye
S2	Ma'anshanjingkaiqu	马鞍山经开区	Elevated	Ma'anshan
1	Maigaoqiao	迈皋桥	Elevated	Qixia
S3	Maluowei	马骡圩	Elevated	Pukou
S8	Maofangchanglu	毛纺厂路	Underground	Pukou
2 S6	Maqun^†	马群	Elevated, Underground	Qixia
4	Mengbei	孟北	Underground	Qixia
10	Mengdudajie	梦都大街	Underground	Jianye
7	Mengdudajiedong	梦都大街东	Underground	Jianye
3	Mingfaguangchang	明发广场	Underground	Yuhuatai
2 6	Minggugong^	明故宫	Underground	Qinhuai
S9	Mingjue	明觉	Elevated	Lishui
2 7	Mochouhu^	莫愁湖	Underground	Qinhuai
3	Moling†	秣陵	Underground	Qinhuai
3	Mozhoudonglu	秣周东路	Underground	Jiangning
7	Mufushan	幕府山	Underground	Qixia
7	Mufuxilu	幕府西路	Underground	Gulou
S2	Mulong	牧龙	Elevated	Jiangning
2	Muxuyuan	苜蓿园	Underground	Qinhuai
7	Nanhu	南湖	Underground	Jianye
1	Nanjing Communications Institute of Technology	南京交院	Elevated	Jiangning
3	Nanjing Forestry University Xinzhuang	南京林业大学·新庄	Underground	Xuanwu
6	Nanjing Hospital of Chinese Medicine	市中医院	Underground	Qinhuai
1	Nanjing Medical University – Jiangsu Institute of Economic and Trade Technology	南医大·江苏经贸学院	Elevated	Jiangning
1 3	Nanjing Railway Station^	南京火车站	Underground	Xuanwu
1 3 6 S1 S3	Nanjing South Railway Station^†	南京南站	Underground^{[d]}	Yuhuatai
10	Nanjing University of Technology	南京工业大学	Underground	Pukou
2	Nanjing University Xianlin Campus	南大仙林校区	Elevated	Qixia
5	Nanjingxi Railway Station	南京西站	Underground	Gulou
S6	Nanjingyuanrendong	南京猿人洞	Elevated	Jiangning
S8	NUIST	信息工程大学	Elevated	Pukou
10	Olympic Stadium	奥体中心	Underground	Jianye
2	Olympic Stadium East	奥体东	Underground	Jianye
S3	Pingliangdajie	平良大街	Underground	Jianye
10	Pukouwanhuicheng	浦口萬汇城	Underground	Pukou
5	Qianzhuang	前庄	Underground	Jiangning
S3	Qiaolinxincheng	桥林新城	Elevated	Pukou
S6	Qilinmen	麒麟门	Underground	Jiangning
5	Qingchunguangchang	青春广场	Underground	Gulou
7	Qingliangshan	清凉山	Underground	Gulou
2	Qinglianjie	青莲街	Underground	Jianye
5	Qiqiaoweng	七桥瓮	Underground	Qinhuai
6	Qixiashan†	栖霞山	Underground	Qixia
S6	Quandudajie	泉都大街	Underground	Jiangning
S7	Qunli	群力	Elevated	Lishui
1	Ruanjiandadao	软件大道	Underground	Yuhuatai
1 5	Sanshanjie^	三山街	Underground	Qinhuai
2 5	Shanghailu^	上海路	Underground	Gulou/Qinhuai
3	Shangqinhuaixi	上秦淮西	Underground	Jiangning
3	Shangyuanmen	上元门	Underground	Gulou
5	Shenjiying	神机营	Underground	Qinhuai
1	Shengtailu	胜太路	Underground	Jiangning
3	Shengtaixilu	胜太西路	Underground	Jiangning
S8	Shenqiao	沈桥	Elevated	Luhe
S4	Shierliban	十二里半	Elevated	Chuzhou
5	Shimenkan	石门坎	Underground	Qinhuai
S3	Shiqihe	石碛河	Elevated	Lishui
S9	Shiqiu	石湫	Elevated	Lishui
10	Shiyanglu	石杨路	Underground	Jiangning
6	Shiyueguangchang	十月广场	Underground	Qixia
S3	Shuanglong	双垅	Elevated	Pukou
1	Shuanglongdadao	双龙大道	Underground	Jiangning
3	Southeast University Chengxian College	东大成贤学院	Underground	Pukou
3	Southeast University Jiulonhgu Campus	东大九龙湖校区	Underground	Jiangning
S4	Suchu Business Center	苏滁商务中心	Elevated	Chuzhou
S2	Taibai†	太白	Elevated	Ma'anshan
3 S8	Taifenglu^	泰冯路	Underground	Pukou
7	Taiqinglu	太清路	Underground	Jianye
S8	Taishanxincun	泰山新村	Underground	Pukou
S6	Tangshan	汤山	Underground	Jiangning
S3	Tianbao	天保	At-grade	Jianye
2	Tianbaojie	天保街	Underground	Jianye
1	Tianlongsi	天隆寺	Underground	Yuhuatai
3	Tianruncheng	天润城	Underground	Pukou
1	Tianyindadao	天印大道	Elevated	Jiangning
3	Tianyuanxilu	天元西路	Underground	Jiangning
S3	Tiexinqiao	铁心桥	Underground	Jianye
5	Tongjimen	通济门	Underground	Qinhuai
S2	Tongjing	铜井	Elevated	Jiangning
S9	Tongshan	铜山	At-grade	Jiangning
S6	Tongshijie	汤山	Elevated	Jiangning
S9	Tuanjiewei	童世界	Elevated	Jurong
4	Wangjiawan	王家湾	Underground	Xuanwu
6 7	Wanshou^	万寿	Underground	Qixia
10	Wendelu	文德路	Underground	Pukou
5	Wenjinglu	文靖路	Underground	Jiangning
S7	Wolonghu	卧龙湖	Elevated	Lishui
3	Wudingmen	武定门	Underground	Qinhuai
S3	Wuhoujie	吴侯街	Underground	Jianye
5	Wutaishan	五台山	Underground	Gulou
3 7	Wutangguangchang^	五塘广场	Underground	Gulou
S7	Wuxiangshan†	无想山	Underground	Lishui
2	Xi'anmen	西安门	Underground	Xuanwu/Qinhuai
5	Xiaguan	下关	Underground	Gulou
2	Xiamafang	下马坊	Underground	Qinhuai
S1	Xiangyulubei	翔宇路北	Elevated	Jiangning
S1 S9	Xiangyulunan^†	翔宇路南	Elevated	Jiangning
2	Xianhemen	仙鹤门	Elevated	Qixia
4	Xianlinhu†	仙林湖	Elevated	Qixia
2	Xianlinzhongxin	仙林中心	Elevated	Qixia
7	Xianxinlu†	仙新路	Underground	Qixia
10	Xiaohang	小行	Elevated	Yuhuatai
2	Xiaolingwei	孝陵卫	Underground	Qinhuai
1	Xiaolongwan	小龙湾	Elevated	Jiangning
3	Xiaoshi	小市	Underground	Gulou
1 7	Xiaozhuang^	晓庄	Underground	Qixia
S8	Xiejiadian	卸甲甸	Elevated	Luhe
4	Xiganghuashu	西岗桦墅	Underground	Jiangning
7	Xinchengkejiyuan	新城科技园	Underground	Jianye
3	Xinghuolu	星火路	Underground	Pukou
2	Xinglongdajie	兴隆大街	Underground	Jiangning
6	Xingxuelu	兴学路	Underground	Qixia
6	Xingzhijie	兴智街	Underground	Qixia
S7	Xingzhuang	幸庄	Underground	Lishui
1 2	Xinjiekou^	新街口	Underground	Qinhuai
1	Xinmofanmalu	新模范马路	Underground	Xuanwu
5	Xintinglu	新亭路	Underground	Jiangning
S8	Xiongzhou	雄州	Underground	Luhe
7 S2	Xishanqiao^†	西善桥	Underground	Yuhuatai
1	Xuanwumen	玄武门	Underground	Xuanwu
2	Xuezelu	学则路	Elevated	Qixia
4	Xuzhuang/Suning HQ	徐庄·苏宁总部	Underground	Xuanwu
5	Yancangqiao	盐仓桥	Underground	Gulou
S2	Yanghu	阳湖	Elevated	Ma'anshan
2	Yangshangongyuan	羊山公园	Elevated	Qixia
10	Yangzhuang	杨庄	Underground	Qinhuai
6	Yanjiangxincheng	燕江新城	Underground	Qixia
1	Yanziji	燕子矶	Underground	Qixia
7	Yaohuamen	尧化门	Underground	Qixia
7	Yaohuaxincun	尧化新村	Underground	Qixia
7	Yingtiandajie	应天大街	Underground	Jianye
6	Yingtiandongjie	应天东街	Underground	Qinhuai
6	Yingyuannanlu	营苑南路	Underground	Xuanwu
7 S3	Yongchulu^	永初路	Underground	Jianye
2 S3	Youfangqiao^	油坊桥	At-grade, Underground	Jianye
2 10	Yuantong^	元通	Underground	Jianye
S2	Yuhua Jingji Development Zone	雨花经济开发区	Underground	Yuhuatai
3	Yuhuamen	雨花门	Underground	Qinhuai
10	Yuhuatai	雨花台	Underground	Yuhuatai
2	Yunjinlu	云锦路	Underground	Gulou
4 5	Yunnanlu^	云南路	Underground	Gulou
2	Yurundajie	雨润大街	Underground	Jianye
S2	Yushandonglu	雨山东路	Elevated	Ma'anshan
10	Yushanlu†	雨山路	Underground	Pukou
2	Yuzui†	鱼嘴	Underground	Jianye
1	Zhangfuyuan	张府园	Underground	Qinhuai
S1	Zhengfangzhonglu	正方中路	Elevated	Jiangning
S7	Zhetang	柘塘	Elevated	Lishui
7	Zhongfulu	钟阜路	Underground	Gulou
6	Zhongheqiao	中和桥	Underground	Qinhuai
1	Zhonghuamen	中华门	Underground	Yuhuatai
2	Zhonglingjie	钟灵街	Underground	Qinhuai
S7	Zhongshanhu	中山湖	Underground	Lishui
7 10	Zhongsheng^	中胜	Underground	Jianye
1	Zhujianglu	珠江路	Underground	Qinhuai
1 5	Zhushanlu^	竹山路	Elevated, Underground	Jiangning

=== Under construction ===
Route	Name	Terminals		Est. opening year	Length	Stations
4	Line 4 (Phase 2)	Zhenzhuquandong	Longjiang (Done in Phase 1)	2026	9.7 km (6.0 mi)	6

Line	Transfer	Station name English	Station name Mandarin	District	Estimated opening
4	–	Zhenzhuquan East†	珍珠泉东	Pukou	2026
4	–	Ruilongjiaoye Park	瑞龙郊野公园	Pukou	2026
4	–	Shifosi	石佛寺	Pukou	2026
4	–	Dingshan Street	定山大街	Pukou	2026
4	–	Jiangbei Economic Area	江北商务区	Pukou	2026
4	–	Jiangbei Civil Center	江北市民中心	Pukou	2026
