= Nanjing railway station =

Railway and metro interchange station in Nanjing

Nanjing 南京
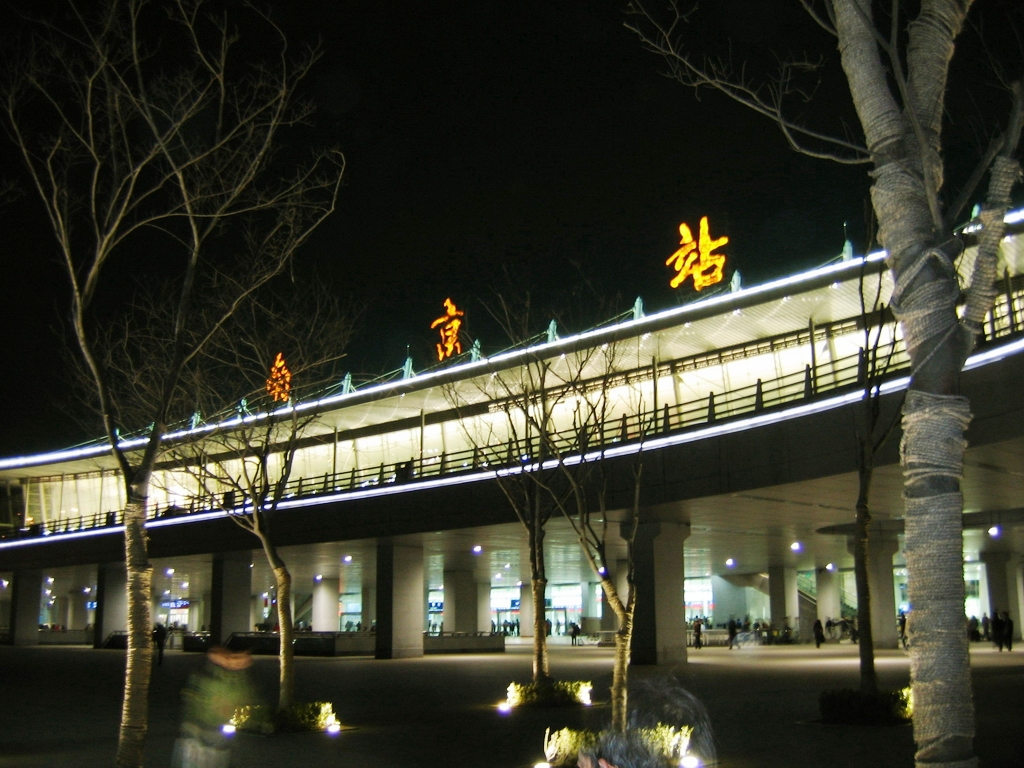
- Nanjing railway station

General information
- Location: Longpan Lu, Xuanwu District, Nanjing, Jiangsu; China
- Coordinates: 32°05′14″N 118°47′51″E
- Operated by: Shanghai Railway Bureau, China Railway Corporation
- Line(s): Line 1; Line 3; Beijing–Shanghai Railway; Nanjing–Xi'an Railway; Nanjing–Qidong Railway; Nanjing–Tongling Railway; Shanghai–Nanjing Intercity Railway
- Platforms: 8
- Connections: Bus terminal

Other information
- Station code: TMIS code: 16805; Telegraph code: NJH; Pinyin code: NJI; 125,310 (Nanjing Metro)
- Classification: 1st class station

History
- Opened: 1968; 3 September 2005 ( Line 1); 1 April 2015 ( Line 3)

Services
Preceding station	China Railway	Following station
Chuzhou North towards Beijing	Beijing–Shanghai railway	Zhenjiang towards Shanghai
Preceding station	China Railway High-speed	Following station
Xianlin towards Shanghai or Shanghai Hongqiao	Shanghai–Nanjing intercity railway Part of the Shanghai–Wuhan–Chengdu passenger-dedicated railway	Terminus
Preceding station	Nanjing Metro	Following station
Hongshan Zoo towards Baguazhoudaqiaonan	Line 1	Xinmofanmalu towards CPU
Xiaoshi towards Linchang	Line 3	NFU / Xinzhuang towards Mozhoudonglu

Nanjing railway station (Chinese: 南京站; pinyin: Nánjīng Zhàn) is a major railway station of Nanjing, the capital of Jiangsu province. It is located in the northern part of Nanjing's urban core (just a short walk from the city wall), near Xuanwu Lake.

== Services ==
Until 2010, this was the main railway station of Nanjing, with the great majority of all trains serving Nanjing using this station. Only a small number of trains, going to the destinations to the southwest of Nanjing, pass through the (old) Nanjing South railway station, which is located south of Nanjing's walled city; service to Nanjing West railway station has been suspended.

After the opening of new Nanjing South railway station in the southern part of greater Nanjing in mid-2010, many of the high-speed trains serving Nanjing have been re-routed to that new station. However, Nanjing station has frequent high-speed service to Shanghai and Shanghai Hongqiao, some services also stopping at Zhenjiang, Changzhou and Suzhou. Some overnight D trains continue on north towards Beijing South railway station, Tianjin West railway station, or Xi'an North railway station.

Nanjing railway station is served by a station of the same name on Line 1 and Line 3 of Nanjing Metro. It is also the terminal for many of the city bus lines.

== History ==
The station opened in September 1968, shortly before the opening of the Nanjing Yangtze River Bridge. The connection with Line 1 of the Nanjing Metro began operations on 3 September 2005 as part of the line's Phase I from Maigaoqiao to Andemen. (Note: The section from Andemen to Olympic Stadium that initially opened as Line 1 was re-designated as Line 10 when the latter opened in 2014.) The interchange with Nanjing Metro Line 3 opened on 1 April 2015 with the opening of that line.

On 30 September 2016 the metro station served a peak volume of 99,800 passengers.

== See also ==
- Zhonghuamen railway station (Nanjing)
- Nanjing South railway station
- Nanjing West railway station
- Nanjing North railway station
