= Nanjing Forestry University – Xinzhuang station =

Nanjing Metro station

NFU/Xinzhuang 南京林业大学·新庄
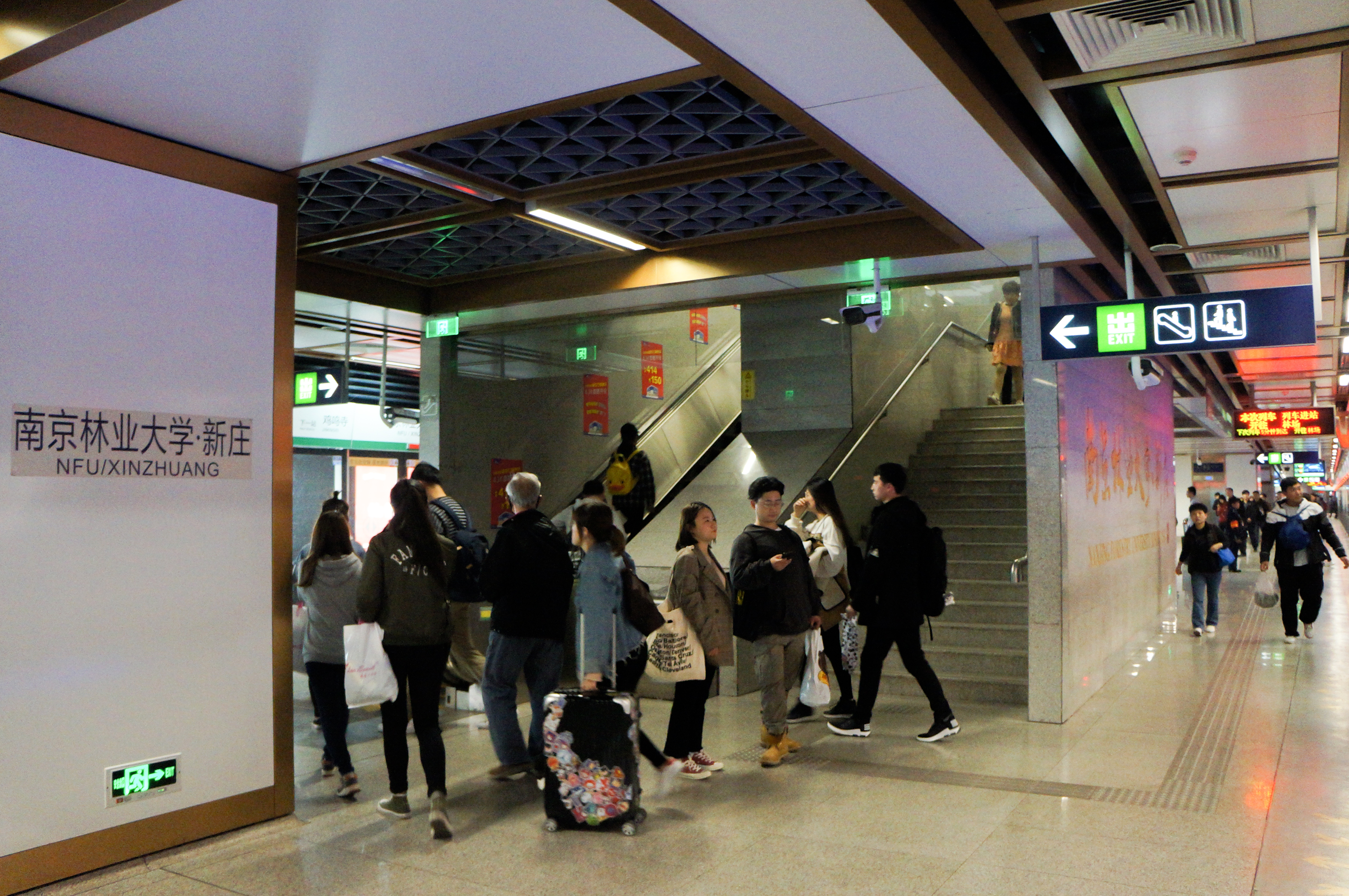

Chinese name
- Simplified Chinese: 南京林业大学·新庄站
- Traditional Chinese: 南京林業大學·新莊站
Transcriptions
Standard Mandarin
- Hanyu Pinyin: Nánjīng Línyè Dàxué·Xīnzhuāng Zhàn

General information
- Location: Longpan Road (龙蟠路); Xuanwu District, Nanjing, Jiangsu; China
- Coordinates: 32°04′35″N 118°48′38″E
- Operated by: Nanjing Metro Co. Ltd.
- Line(s): Line 3

Construction
- Structure type: Underground

Other information
- Station code: 311

History
- Opened: 1 April 2015

Services
Preceding station	Nanjing Metro	Following station
Nanjing Railway Station towards Linchang	Line 3	Jimingsi towards Mozhoudonglu
Location

Nanjing Forestry University Xinzhuang station is a station of Line 3 of the Nanjing Metro. It started operations on 1 April 2015.
