= Xiaoshi station =

Nanjing Metro station

Xiaoshi 小市
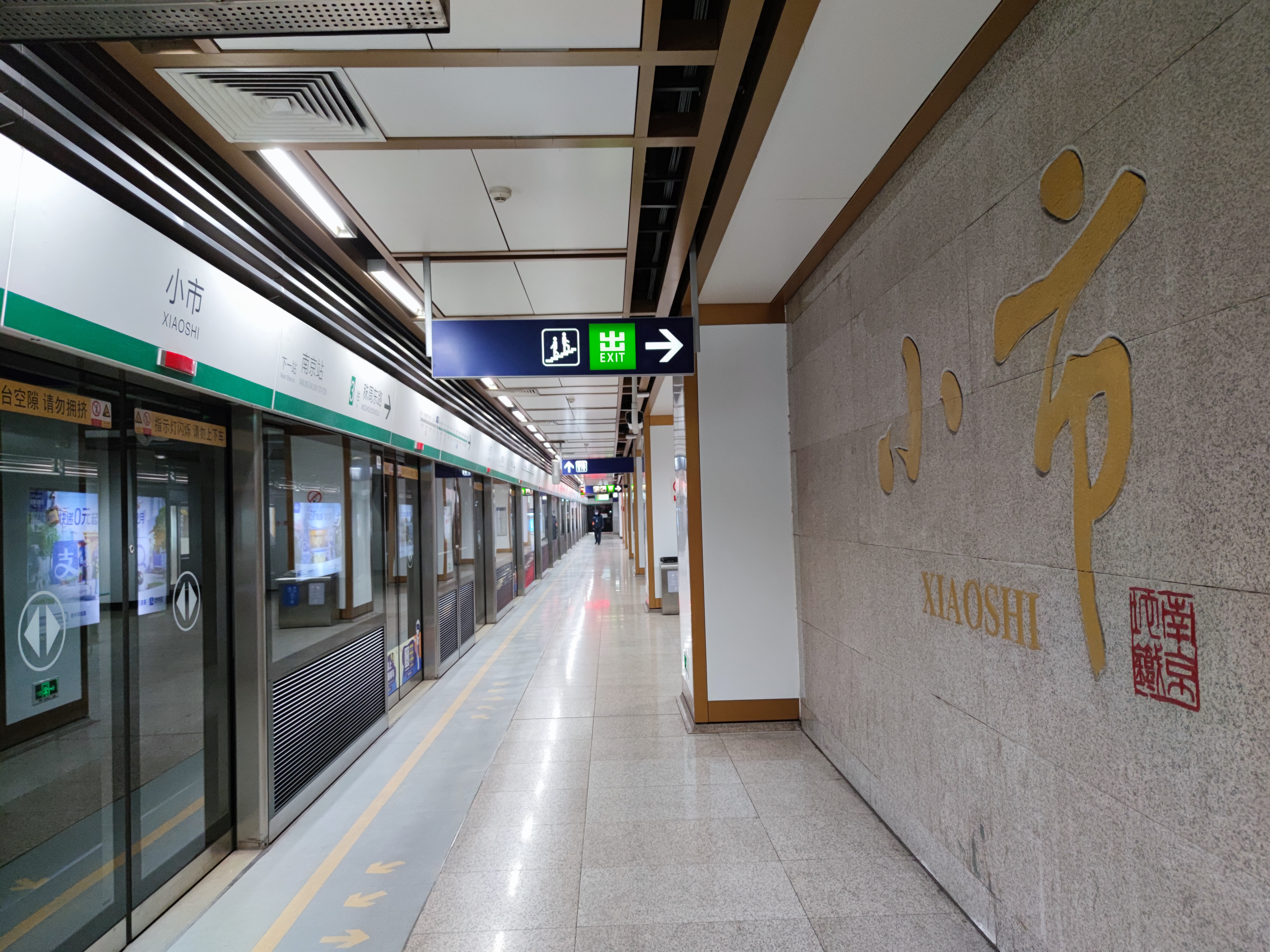

General information
- Location: North Zhongyang Road and Heyan Road; Gulou District, Nanjing, Jiangsu; China
- Coordinates: 32°05′42″N 118°47′09″E
- Operated by: Nanjing Metro Co. Ltd.
- Line(s): Line 3

Construction
- Structure type: Underground

Other information
- Station code: 309

History
- Opened: 1 April 2015

Services
Preceding station	Nanjing Metro	Following station
Wutangguangchang towards Linchang	Line 3	Nanjing Railway Station towards Mozhoudonglu
Location

Xiaoshi station (Chinese: 小市站; pinyin: Xiǎoshì Zhàn) is a station of Line 3 of the Nanjing Metro. It started operations on 1 April 2015.
