= Southeast University Chengxian College station =

Nanjing Metro station

Southeast University Chengxian College 东大成贤学院
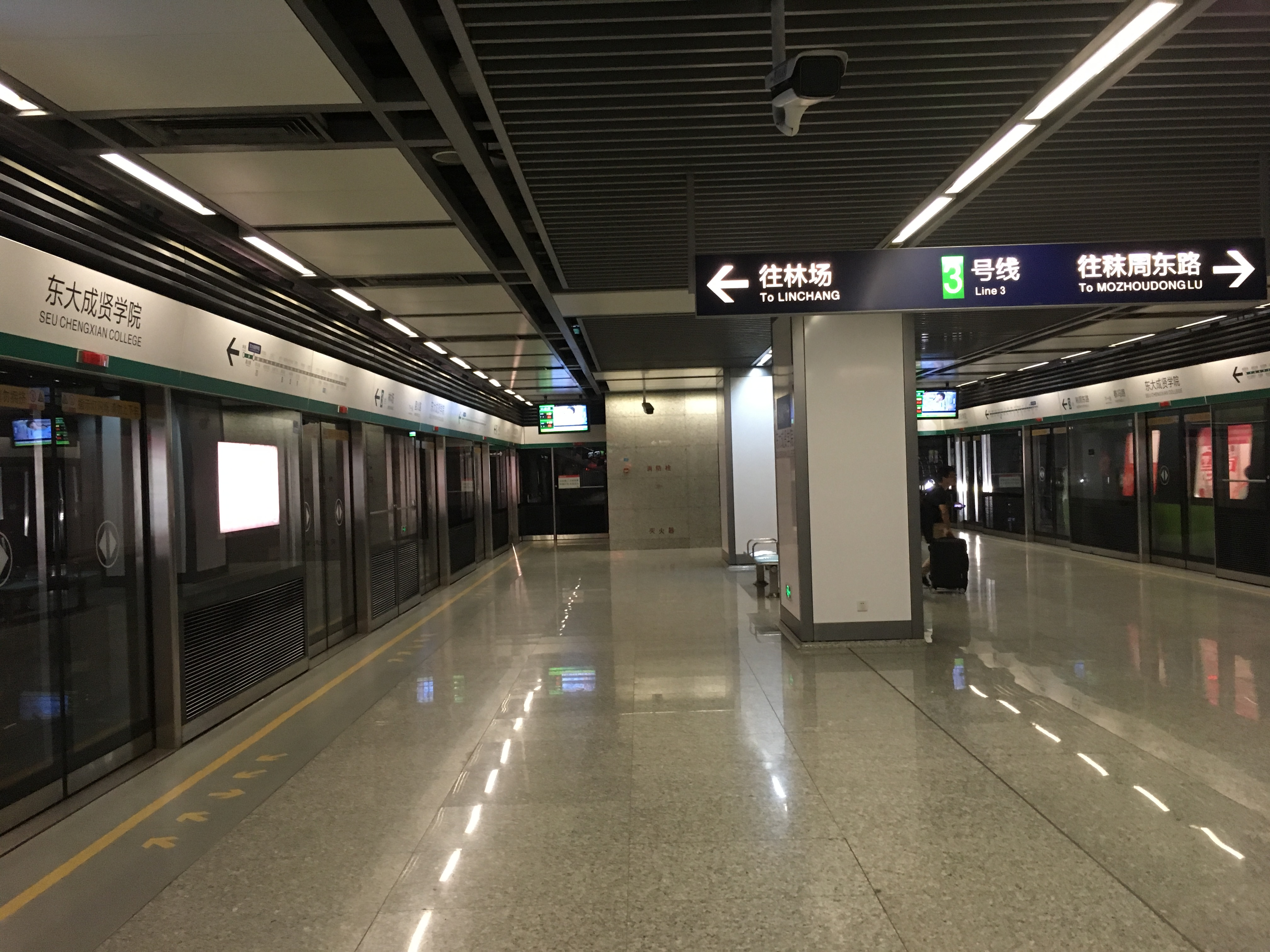

Chinese name
- Simplified Chinese: 东大成贤学院站
- Traditional Chinese: 東大成賢學院站
Transcriptions
Standard Mandarin
- Hanyu Pinyin: Dōngdà Chéngxián Xuéyuàn Zhàn

General information
- Location: Pukou District, Nanjing, Jiangsu; China
- Coordinates: 32°09′23″N 118°42′28″E)
- Operated by: Nanjing Metro Co. Ltd.
- Line(s): Line 3

Construction
- Structure type: Underground

Other information
- Station code: 303

History
- Opened: 1 April 2015

Services
Preceding station	Nanjing Metro	Following station
Xinghuolu towards Linchang	Line 3	Taifenglu towards Mozhoudonglu

Southeast University Chengxian College station is a station of Line 3 of the Nanjing Metro. It started operations on 1 April 2015. The Southeast University Chengxian College campus is located to the southwest of the station.
