= Jimingsi station =

Nanjing Metro interchange station

Jimingsi 鸡鸣寺

General information
- Location: East Beijing Road and North Taiping Road; Xuanwu District, Nanjing, Jiangsu; China
- Coordinates: 32°03′26″N 118°47′53″E
- Operator: Nanjing Metro Co. Ltd.
- Lines: Line 3; Line 4

Construction
- Structure type: Underground

Other information
- Station code: 312 (Line 3); 414 (Line 4)

History
- Opened: 1 April 2015 (Line 3); 18 January 2017 (Line 4)

Services
Preceding station	Nanjing Metro	Following station
NFU / Xinzhuang towards Linchang	Line 3	Fuqiao towards Moling
Gulou towards Longjiang	Line 4	Jiuhuashan towards Xianlinhu
Location

Jimingsi station (simplified Chinese: 鸡鸣寺站; traditional Chinese: 雞鳴寺站; pinyin: Jīmíngsì Zhàn) is interchange station between Line 3 and Line 4 of the Nanjing Metro. It is named after Jiming Temple and also serves the Nanjing city government headquarters. It started operations on Line 3 on 1 April 2015, while the interchange with Line 4 opened along with the opening of that line on 18 January 2017.
