= New Century Plaza (Nanjing) =

Skyscraper complex in Nanjing, Jiangsu, China

Coordinates: 32°02′32.9″N 118°47′24.3″E

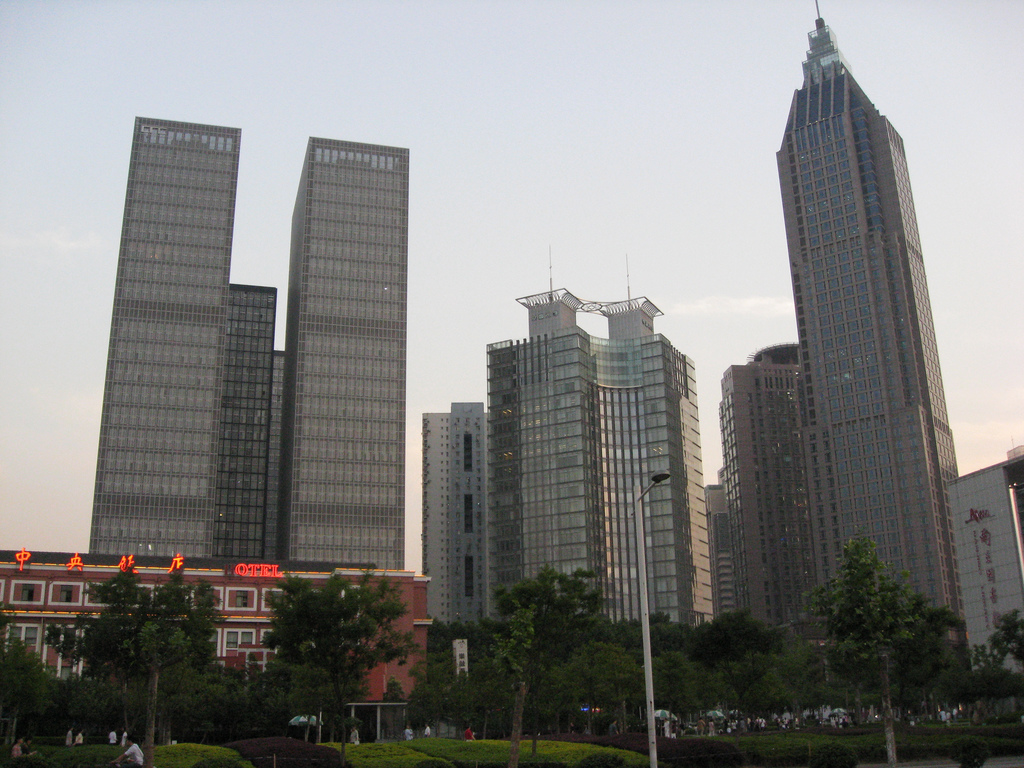
Nanjing downtown view

New Century Plaza (Chinese: 新世纪广场) is a tower complex located in Nanjing, China. Tower A, the main building, is a 255.2 meter (837 foot) tall skyscraper.

== Transportation ==
The building is accessible from Daxinggong Station of Nanjing Metro.

== See also ==
- List of skyscrapers
