= Chengxindadao station =

Metro station in Nanjing, China

Chengxindadao 诚信大道
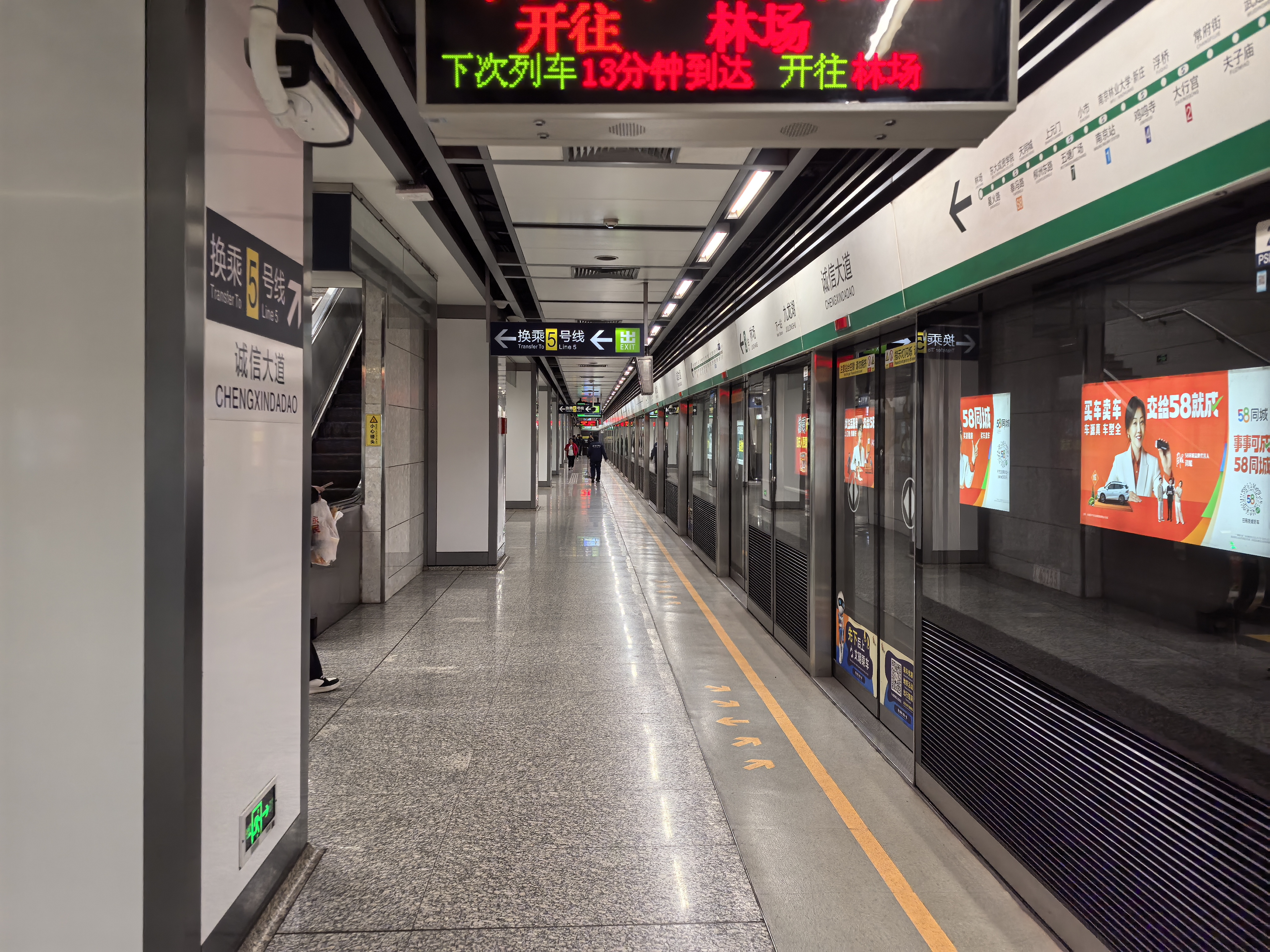
- Platform of Line 3

General information
- Location: Jiangning District, Nanjing, Jiangsu; China
- Coordinates: 31.91018°N 118.8248°E
- Operated by: Nanjing Metro Co. Ltd.
- Lines: Line 3 Line 5

Construction
- Structure type: Underground

Other information
- Station code: 327

History
- Opened: 1 April 2015 (Line 3); 31 March 2024 (Line 5)

Services
Preceding station	Nanjing Metro	Following station
Jiulonghu towards Linchang	Line 3	SEU Jiulonghu Campus towards Moling
Qianzhuang towards Fangjiaying	Line 5	Jiulonghunan towards Jiyindadao
Location

Chengxindadao station (Chinese: 诚信大道站; pinyin: Chéngxìn Dàdào zhàn) is a station on Line 3 and Line 5 of the Nanjing Metro. It started operations on 1 April 2015.
