= Wutangguangchang station =

Nanjing Metro station

Wutangguangchang 五塘广场
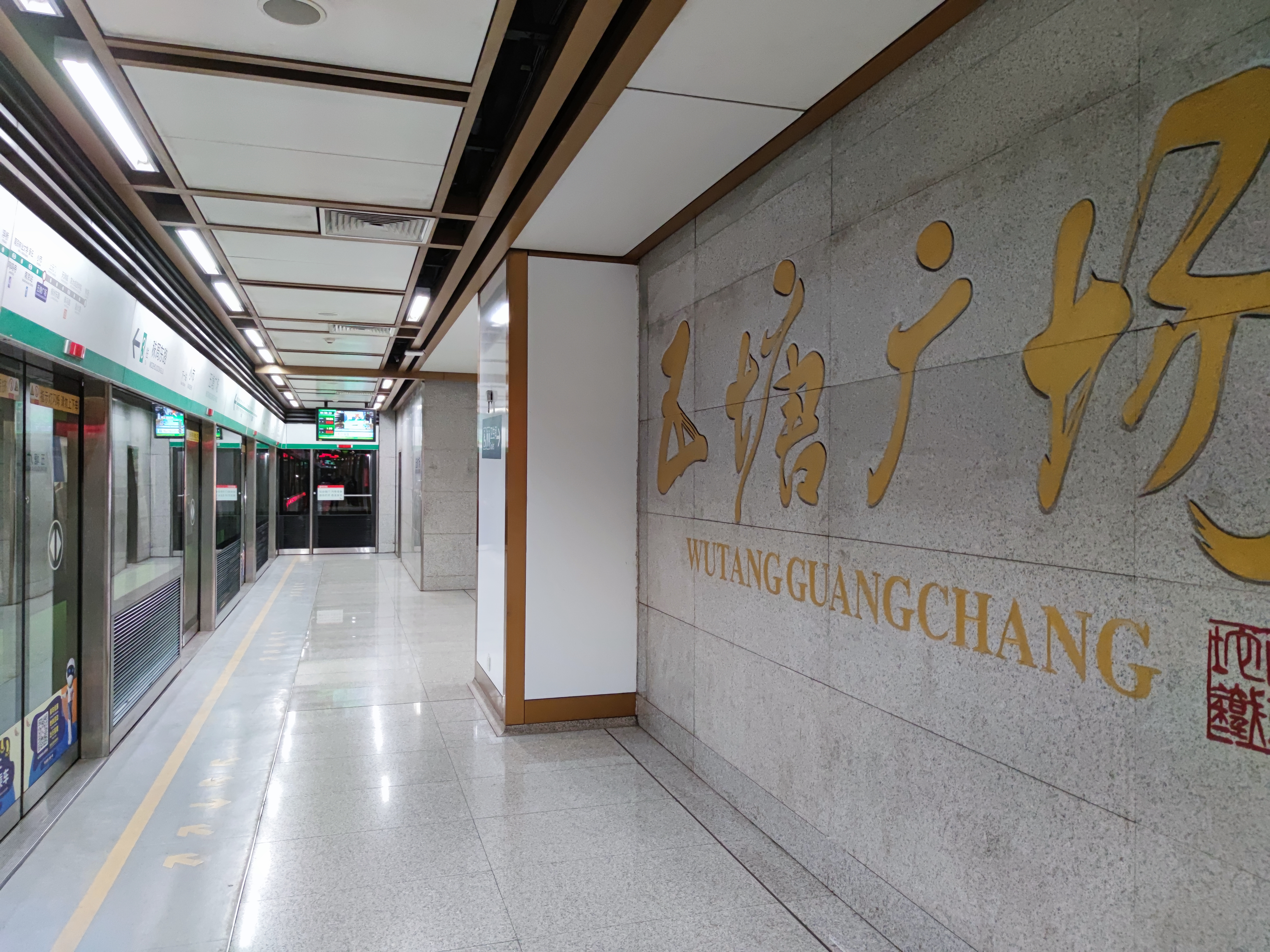
- Line 3 platform

General information
- Location: North Zhongyang Road and East Mufu Road (幕府东路); Gulou District, Nanjing, Jiangsu; China
- Coordinates: 32°06′38″N 118°46′40″E
- Operated by: Nanjing Metro Co. Ltd.
- Lines: Line 3; Line 7

Construction
- Structure type: Underground

Other information
- Station code: 308

History
- Opened: 1 April 2015

Services
Preceding station	Nanjing Metro	Following station
Shangyuanmen towards Linchang	Line 3	Xiaoshi towards Moling
Mufushan towards Xianxinlu	Line 7	Mufuxilu towards Xishanqiao
Location

Wutangguangchang station (simplified Chinese: 五塘广场站; traditional Chinese: 五塘廣場站; pinyin: Wǔtángguǎngchǎng Zhàn) is a station of Line 3 of the Nanjing Metro. It started operations on 1 April 2015. It is one of nine stations on Line 3 that are decorated with a Dream of the Red Chamber theme. On 28 December 2022, the platform of Line 7 started operation.
