= Mingfaguangchang station =

Nanjing Metro station

Mingfaguangchang 明发广场
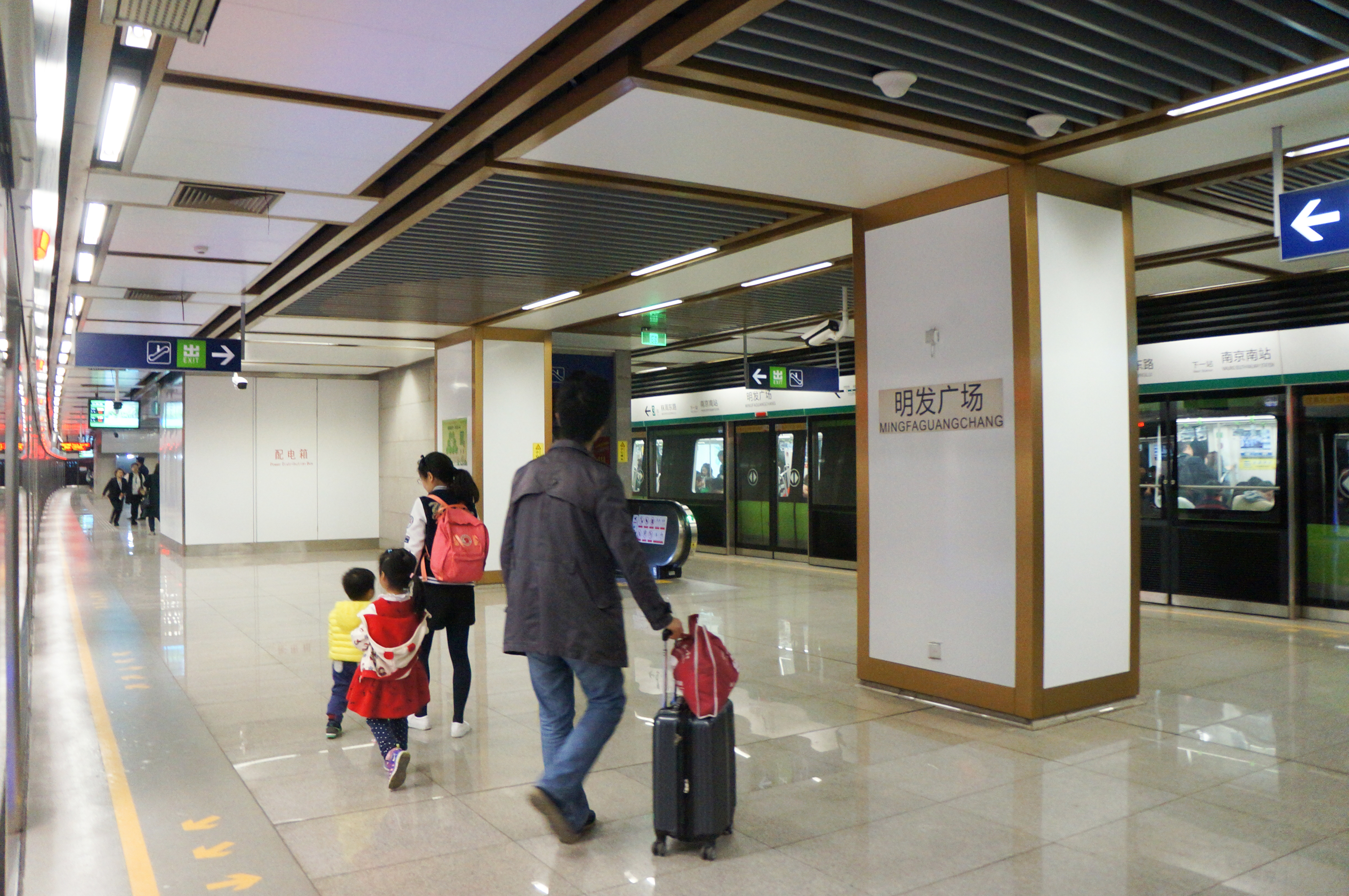

General information
- Location: Yuhuatai District, Nanjing, Jiangsu; China
- Operated by: Nanjing Metro Co. Ltd.
- Line: Line 3

Construction
- Structure type: Underground

Other information
- Station code: 321

History
- Opened: 1 April 2015

Services
Preceding station	Nanjing Metro	Following station
Daminglu towards Linchang	Line 3	Nanjing South Railway Station towards Moling
Location

Mingfaguangchang station (Chinese: 明发广场站) is a station on Line 3 of the Nanjing Metro. It started operations on 1 April 2015.
