= Tianruncheng station =

Nanjing Metro station

Tianruncheng 天润城
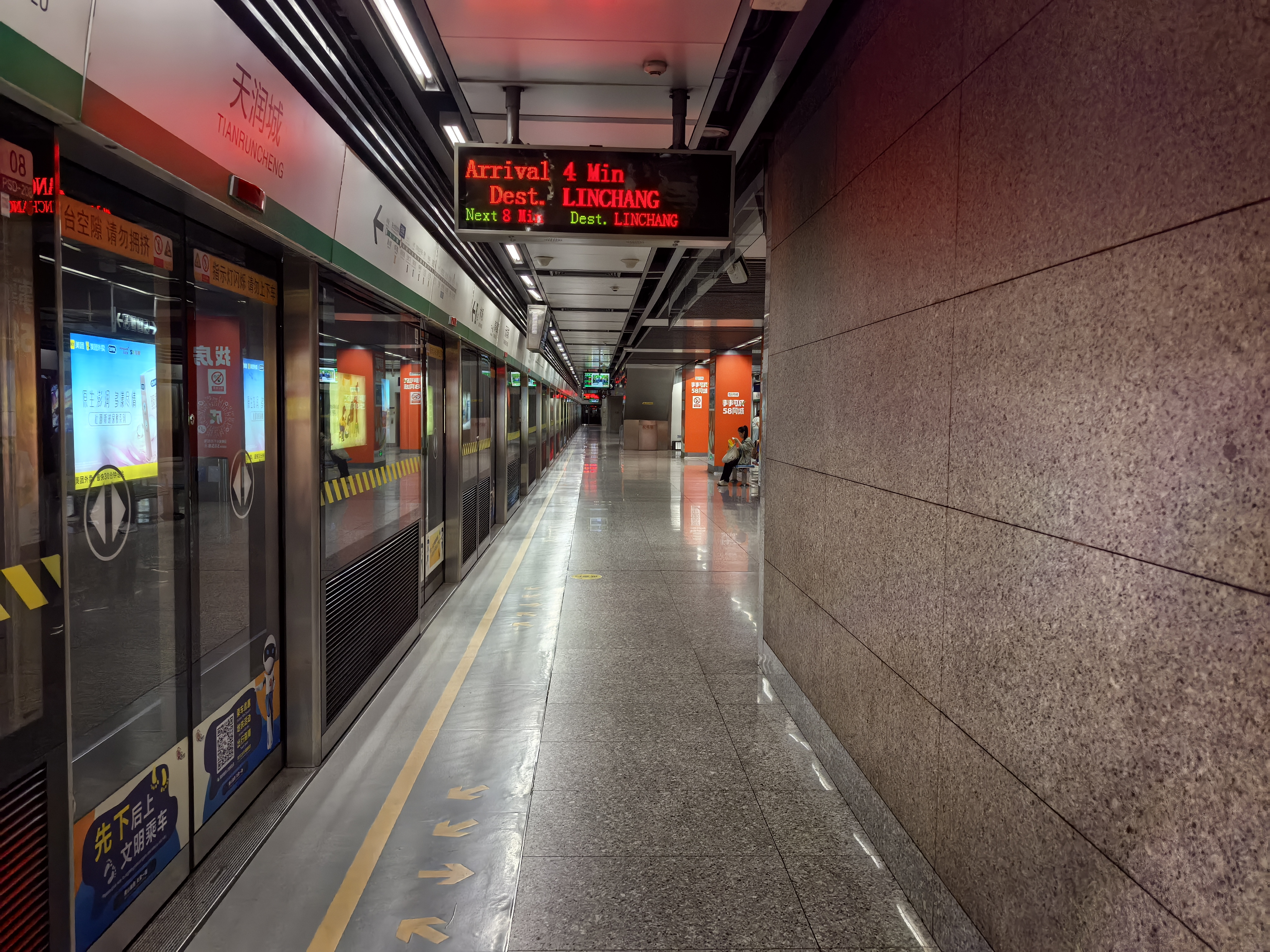

General information
- Location: Pukou District, Nanjing, Jiangsu; China
- Coordinates: 32°09′03″N 118°44′03″E)
- Operated by: Nanjing Metro Co. Ltd.
- Line: Line 3

Construction
- Structure type: Underground

Other information
- Station code: 305

History
- Opened: 1 April 2015

Services
Preceding station	Nanjing Metro	Following station
Taifenglu towards Linchang	Line 3	Liuzhoudonglu towards Moling
Location

Tianruncheng station (simplified Chinese: 天润城站; traditional Chinese: 天潤城站; pinyin: Tiānrùnchéng Zhàn) is a station of Line 3 of the Nanjing Metro. It started operations on 1 April 2015.
