= Fuzimiao station =

Nanjing Metro station

Fuzimiao 夫子庙
- Platform of Line 3

General information
- Location: Qinhuai District, Nanjing, Jiangsu; China
- Coordinates: 32°01′35″N 118°47′09″E
- Operator: Nanjing Metro Co. Ltd.
- Lines: Line 3; Line 5

Construction
- Structure type: Underground

History
- Opened: 1 April 2015 (Line 3); 6 August 2025 (Line 5)

Services
Preceding station	Nanjing Metro	Following station
Changfujie towards Linchang	Line 3	Wudingmen towards Moling
Sanshanjie towards Fangjiaying	Line 5	Tongjimen towards Jiyindadao
Location

Fuzimiao station (Chinese: 夫子庙站) is a station on Line 3 of the Nanjing Metro, and a interchange station with the Line 5. It started operations on 1 April 2015. The station is near Nanjing Fuzimiao.
