= Shengtaixilu station =

Metro station in Nanjing, China

Shengtaixilu 胜太西路
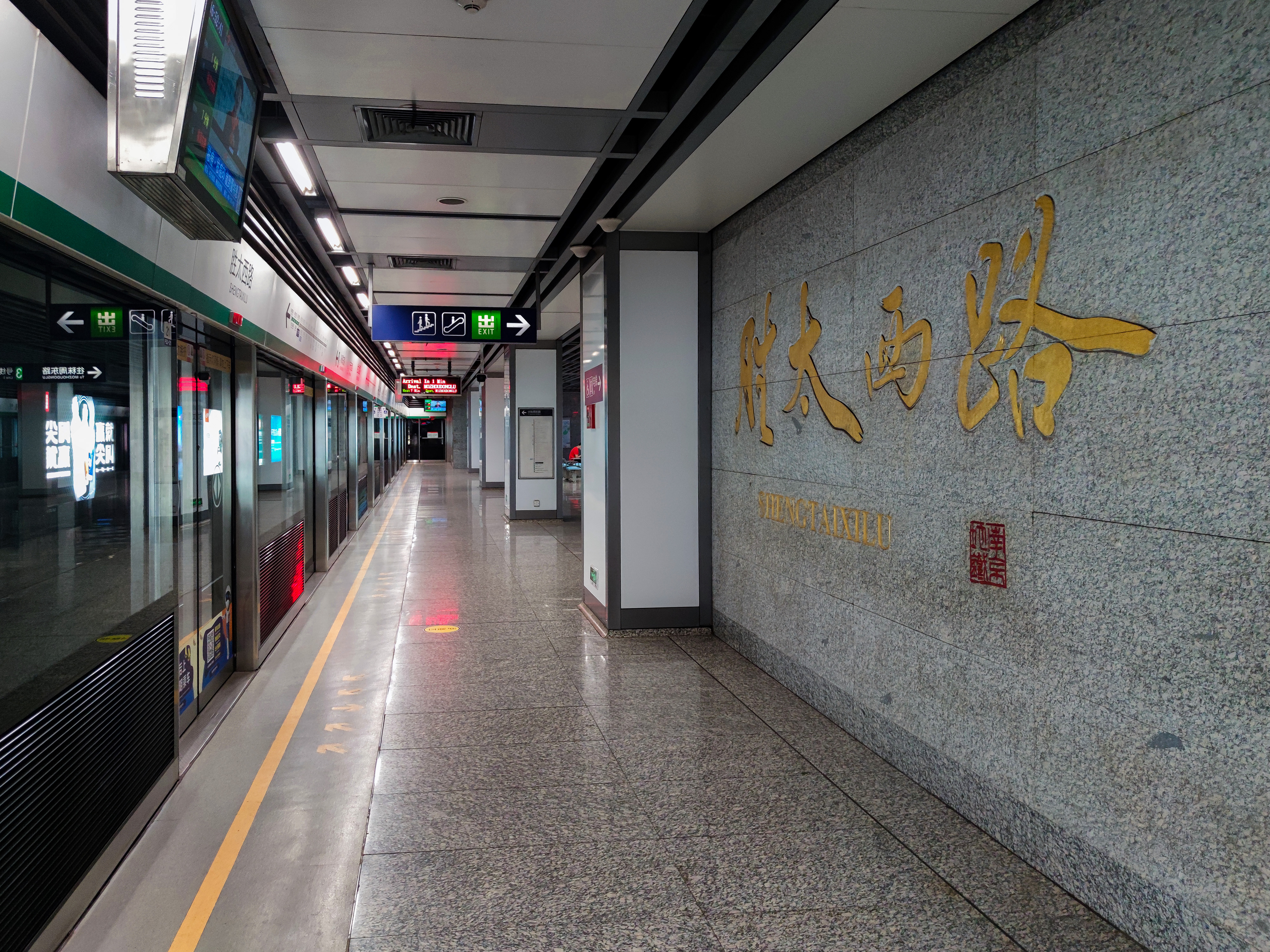

General information
- Location: Jiangning District, Nanjing, Jiangsu; China
- Operated by: Nanjing Metro Co. Ltd.
- Line: Line 3

Construction
- Structure type: Underground

Other information
- Station code: 324

History
- Opened: 1 April 2015

Services
Preceding station	Nanjing Metro	Following station
Hongyundadao towards Linchang	Line 3	Tianyuanxilu towards Moling
Location

Shengtaixilu station (Chinese: 胜太西路站) is a station on Line 3 of the Nanjing Metro. It started operations on 1 April 2015.
