= Wudingmen station =

Nanjing Metro station

Wudingmen 武定门
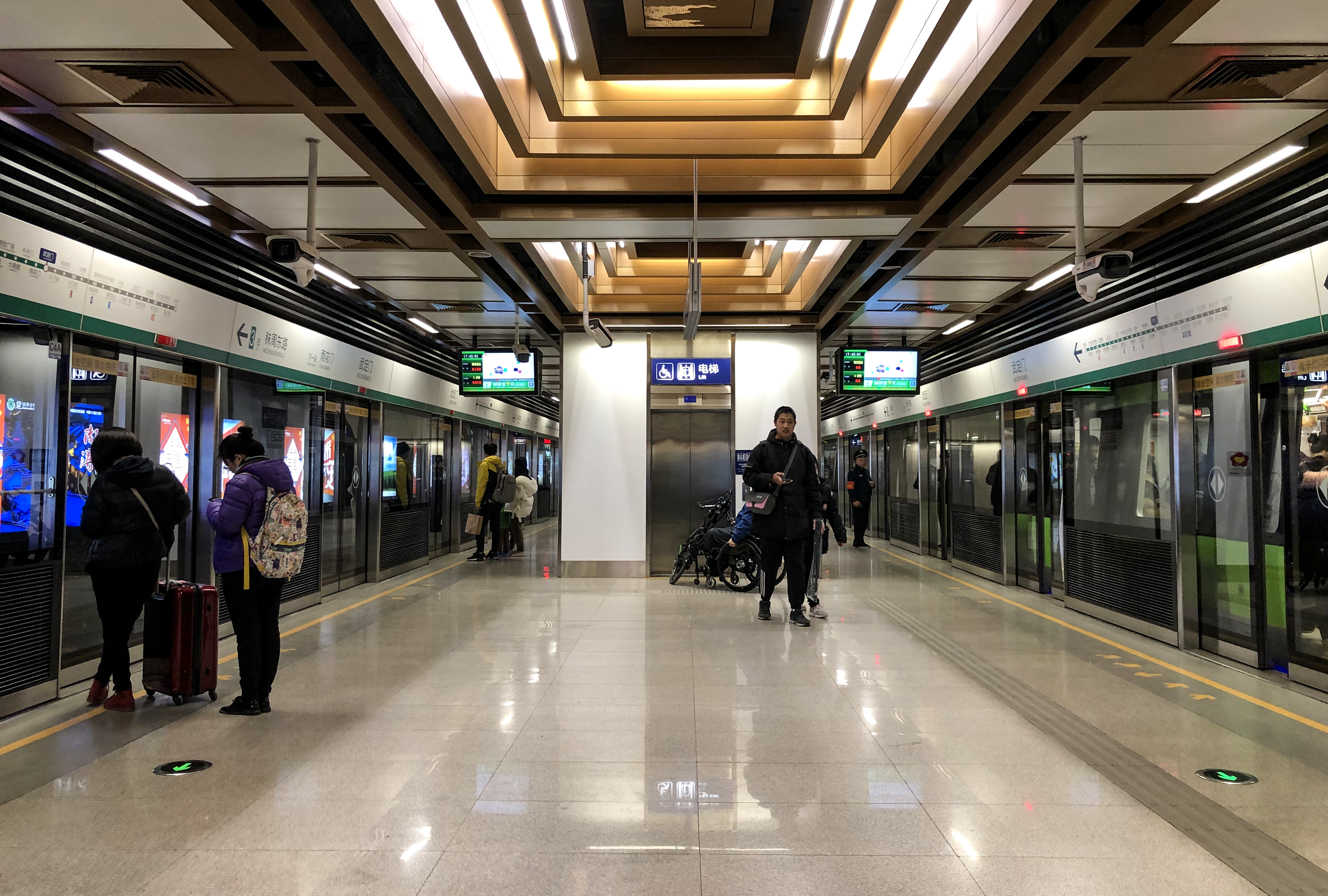

General information
- Location: Qinhuai District, Nanjing, Jiangsu; China
- Coordinates: 32.0156°N 118.7893°E
- Operated by: Nanjing Metro Co. Ltd.
- Line: Line 3

Construction
- Structure type: Underground

Other information
- Station code: 317

History
- Opened: 1 April 2015

Services
Preceding station	Nanjing Metro	Following station
Fuzimiao towards Linchang	Line 3	Yuhuamen towards Moling
Location

Wudingmen station (Chinese: 武定门站) is a station on Line 3 of the Nanjing Metro. It started operations on 1 April 2015.
