= Fuqiao station =

Nanjing Metro station

Fuqiao 浮桥
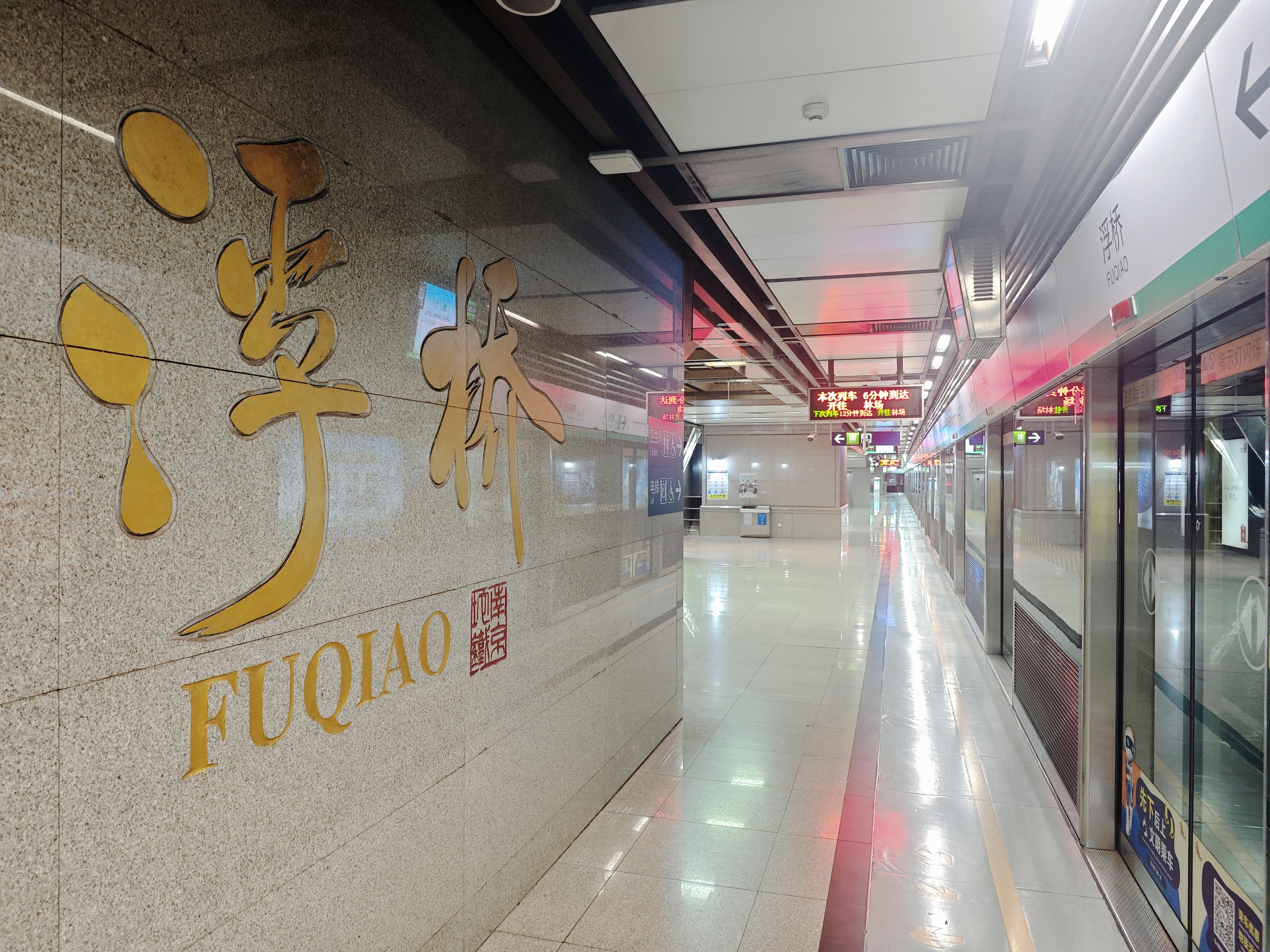
- Platform to Linchang Station

General information
- Location: Xuanwu District, Nanjing, Jiangsu; China
- Operator: Nanjing Metro Co. Ltd.
- Line: Line 3

Construction
- Structure type: Underground

Other information
- Station code: 313

History
- Opened: 1 April 2015

Services
Preceding station	Nanjing Metro	Following station
Jimingsi towards Linchang	Line 3	Daxinggong towards Moling
Location

Fuqiao station (Chinese: 浮桥站) is a station on Line 3 of the Nanjing Metro. It started operations on 1 April 2015.
