= Mufuxilu station =

Nanjing Metro interchange station

Mufuxilu 幕府西路
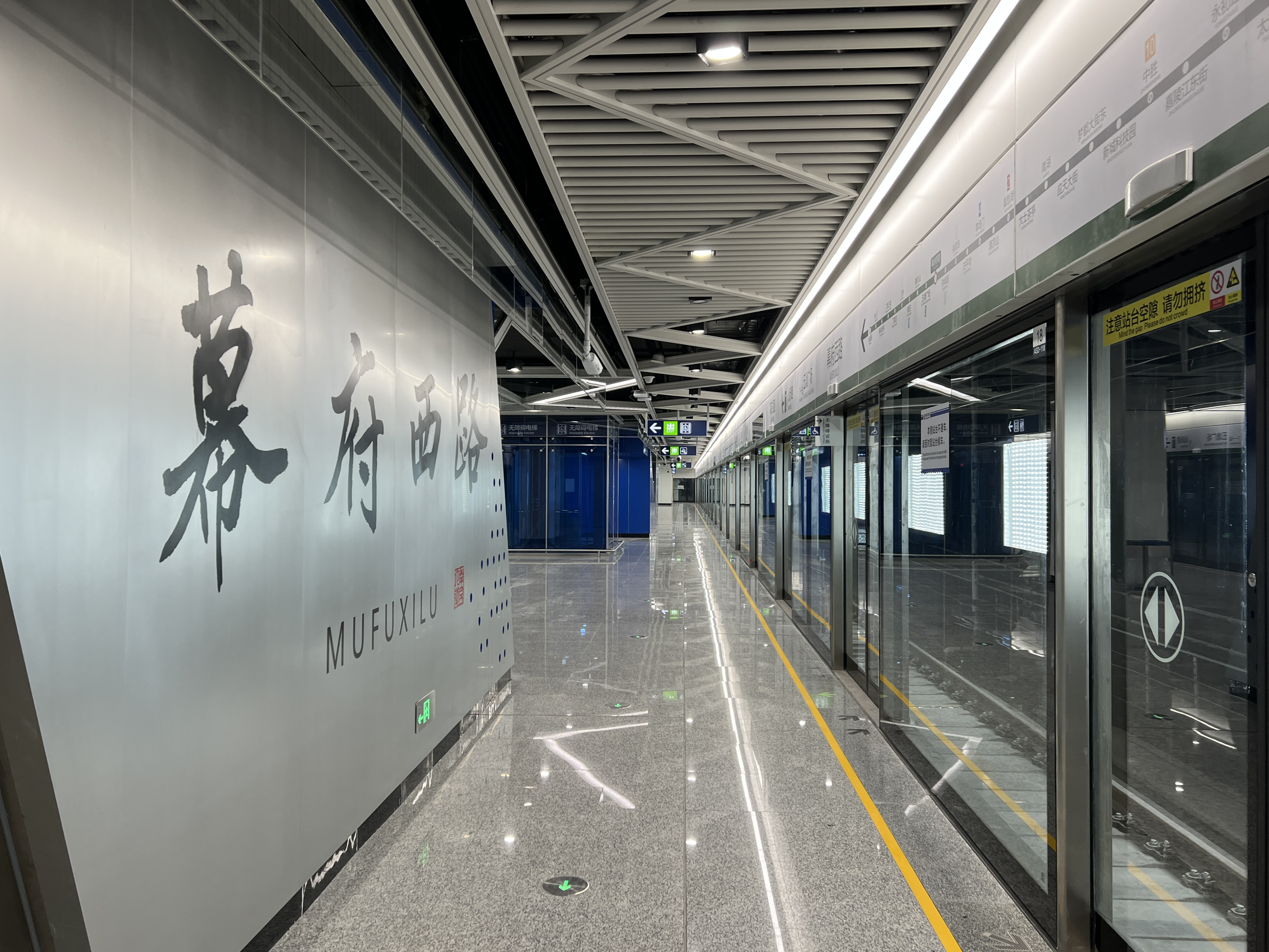
- One of the platforms at Mufuxilu Station in 2022

General information
- Location: Gulou District, Nanjing, Jiangsu; China
- Operated by: Nanjing Metro Co. Ltd.
- Line: Line 7

Construction
- Structure type: Underground

History
- Opened: 28 December 2022

Services
Preceding station	Nanjing Metro	Following station
Wutangguangchang towards Xianxinlu	Line 7	Zhongfulu towards Xishanqiao
Location

Mufuxilu Station (Chinese: 幕府西路站; pinyin: Mùfǔxīlù Zhàn) is a station on Line 7 of the Nanjing Metro. It is located on the junction of West Mufu Road (幕府西路) and Cuiping Road (翠平路), and the middle part of West Mufu Road. It was the temporary terminus for the northern part of Line 7 until the central section from Mufuxilu to Yingtiandajie opened on 28 December 2024.

== History ==
On 20 December 2017, the construction of this station began.

On 28 December 2022, the station started operations with the northern part of Line 7.

== Station Structure ==
Mufuxilu Station is located in the middle of West Mufu Road, and it has an island platform and a side platform.

In the middle of the station lies a stabling line. Before the southern part of Line 7 starts operations, the northern part uses this track to switch directions and allowing passengers to go on or off the train.

There is a high height difference between two sides of West Mufu Road, and the distance between Wutangguangchang and this station is short. So, due to the gradeability of the line, the stabling track is placed in the middle of the station.

=== Floor Guide ===
B1; Concourse	Exits, Customer service, Vending machines
B2; Platforms	Side platform
B2; Platforms	← Line 7 to Xishanqiao (Zhongfulu)
B2; Platforms	Line 7 to Xianxinlu (Wutangguangchang) →
B2; Platforms	Island platform
B2; Platforms	No regular service
