= Daxinggong station =

Nanjing Metro interchange station

Daxinggong 大行宫
- Platform of Line 3

General information
- Location: East Zhongshan Road and North Taiping Road; Xuanwu District, Nanjing, Jiangsu; China
- Coordinates: 32°02′29″N 118°47′40″E
- Operator: Nanjing Metro Co. Ltd.
- Lines: Line 2; Line 3

Construction
- Structure type: Underground

Other information
- Station code: 216 (Line 2); 314 (Line 3)

History
- Opened: 28 May 2010 (Line 2); 1 April 2015 (Line 3)

Services
Preceding station	Nanjing Metro	Following station
Xinjiekou towards Yuzui	Line 2	Xi'anmen towards Jingtianlu
Fuqiao towards Linchang	Line 3	Changfujie towards Moling
Location

Daxinggong station (Chinese: 大行宫站; pinyin: Dàxínggōng Zhàn) is an interchange station of Line 2 and Line 3 of the Nanjing Metro. It started operations on 28 May 2010 along with the rest of Line 2. The interchange with Line 3 opened along with the rest of that line on 1 April 2015.

The station is decorated with a Chinese New Year theme.

== Around the station ==
- Centre Hotel
- Jiangsu Art Gallery
- Nanjing Great Hall of the People
- Nanjing Library
- New Century Plaza Tower A
- Presidential Palace
