= Southeast University Jiulonghu Campus station =

Metro station in Nanjing, China

Coordinates: 31.8979°N 118.8252°E

Southeast University Jiulonghu Campus 东大九龙湖校区
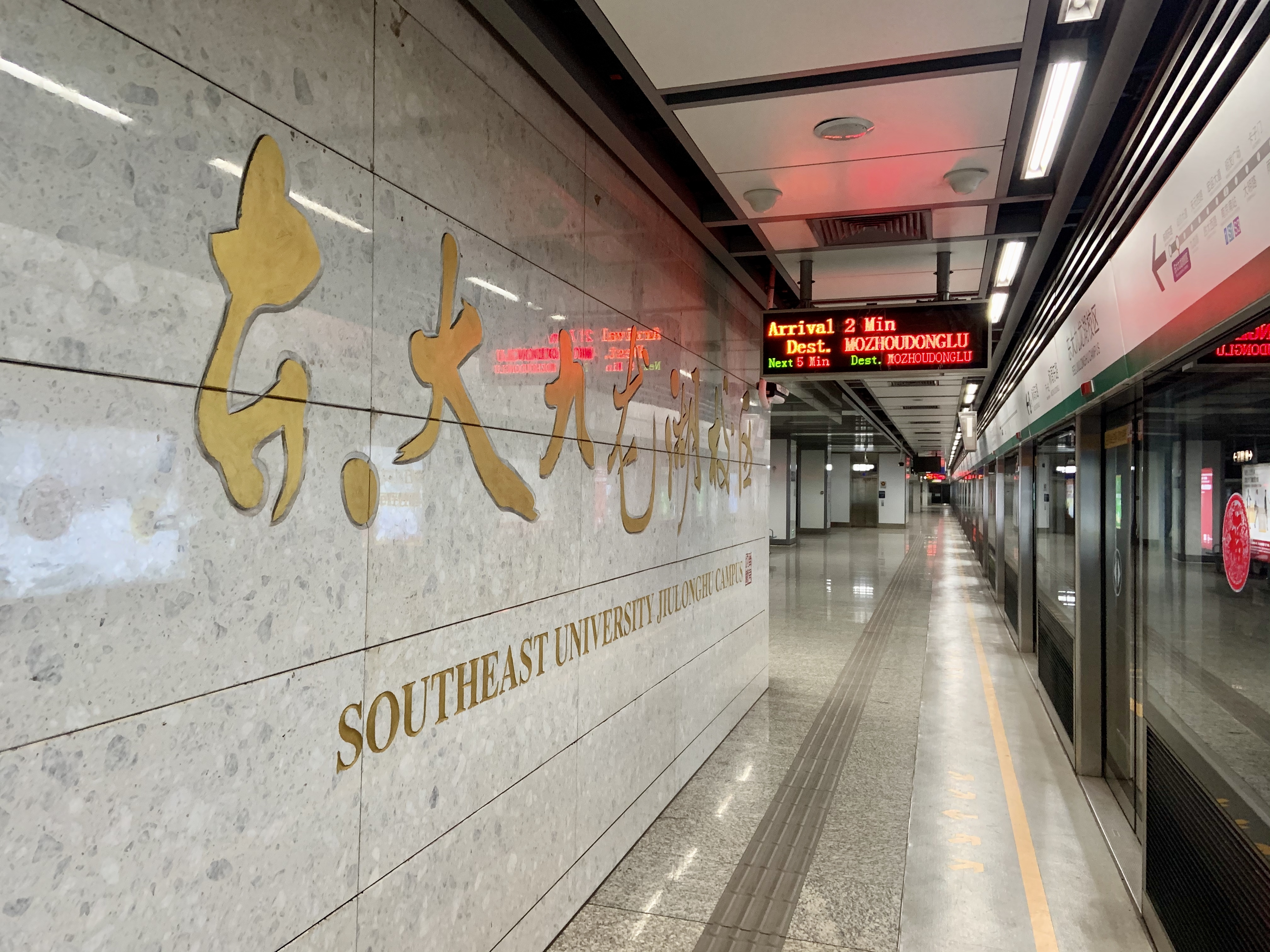

General information
- Location: Jiangning District, Nanjing, Jiangsu; China
- Operated by: Nanjing Metro Co. Ltd.
- Line(s): Line 3

Construction
- Structure type: Underground

Other information
- Station code: 328

History
- Opened: 1 April 2015

Services
Preceding station	Nanjing Metro	Following station
Chengxindadao towards Linchang	Line 3	Mozhoudonglu Terminus
Location

Southeast University Jiulonghu Campus station (Chinese: 东大九龙湖校区站) is a station on Line 3 of the Nanjing Metro. It started operations on 1 April 2015. The station is near Southeast University Jiulonghu Campus.
