= Line 7 (Nanjing Metro) =

Nanjing Metro line

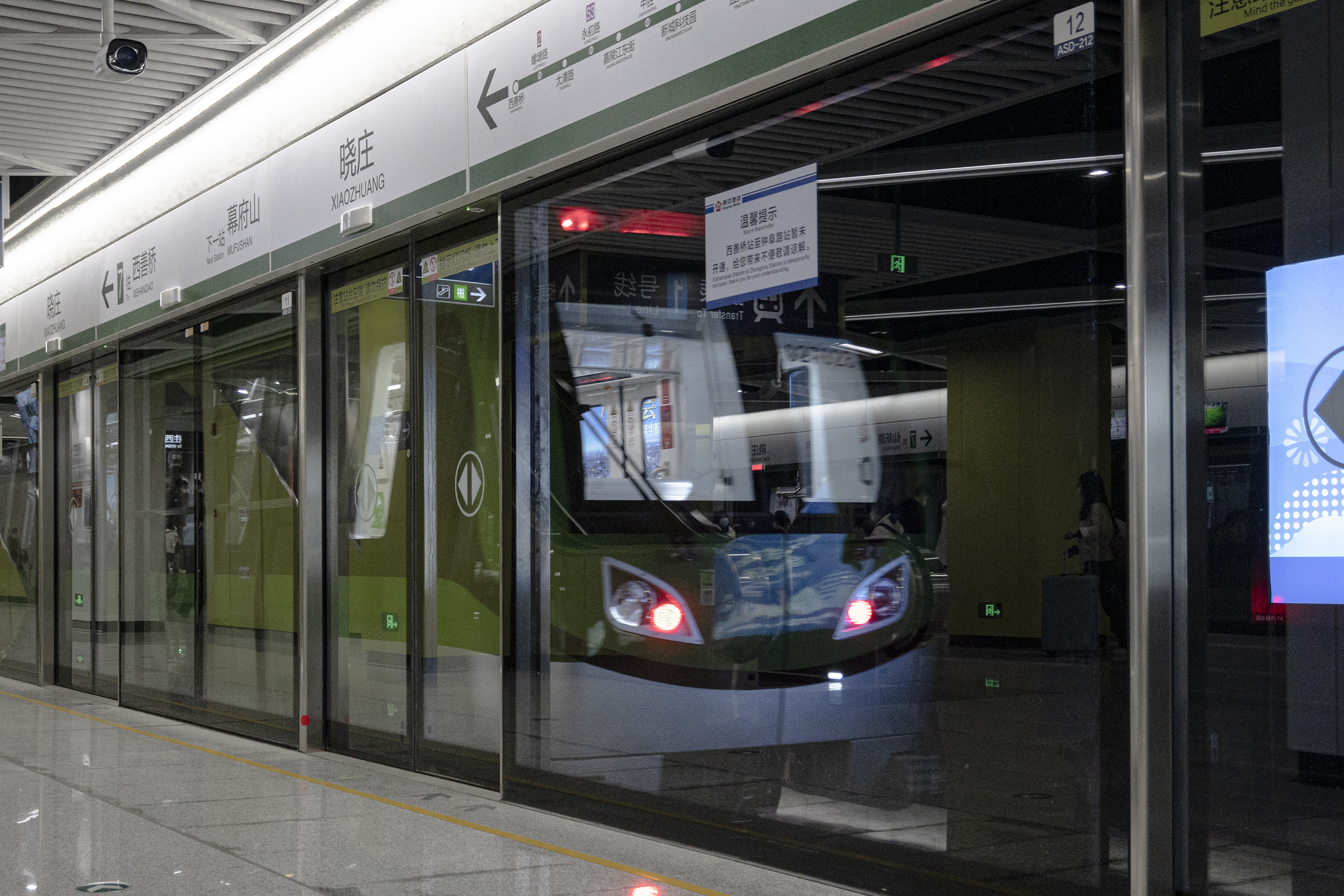
- Line 7 train at Xiaozhuang station

Overview
- Status: In operation
- Locale: Qixia, Gulou, Jianye, and Yuhuatai districts Nanjing, Jiangsu
- Termini: Xianxinlu; Xishanqiao
- Stations: 27

Service
- Type: Rapid transit

History
- Opened: 28 December 2022; 3 years ago

Technical
- Line length: 35.7 km (22.2 mi)
- Number of tracks: 2
- Character: Underground
- Track gauge: 1,435 mm (4 ft 8 1/2 in)
- Operating speed: 80 km/h (Maximum)

Line 7 of Nanjing Metro is a northeast–southwest line running roughly parallel to the south bank of the Yangtze River. The line began operation on 28 December 2022. This line is also the first metro line to use GoA4 automated trains in Nanjing.

== History ==
Construction of Line 7 began on 29 November 2017.

The north section from Xianxinlu to Mufuxilu opened on 28 December 2022, the sorth section from Yingtiandajie to Xishanqiao opened on 28 December 2023, and the central section from Mufuxilu to Yingtiandajie opened on 28 December 2024.

To allow construction of middle section, both north and south section of line 7 suspended operation during 10 July and 18 August 2024.

=== Opening timeline ===
Segment	Commencement	Length	Station(s)	Name
Xianxinlu — Mufuxilu	28 December 2022	13.84 km (8.60 mi)	10	North section
Yingtiandajie — Xishanqiao	28 December 2023	10.66 km (6.62 mi)	9	South section
Mufuxilu — Yingtiandajie	28 December 2024	11.2 km (6.96 mi)	8	Central section

== Stations ==
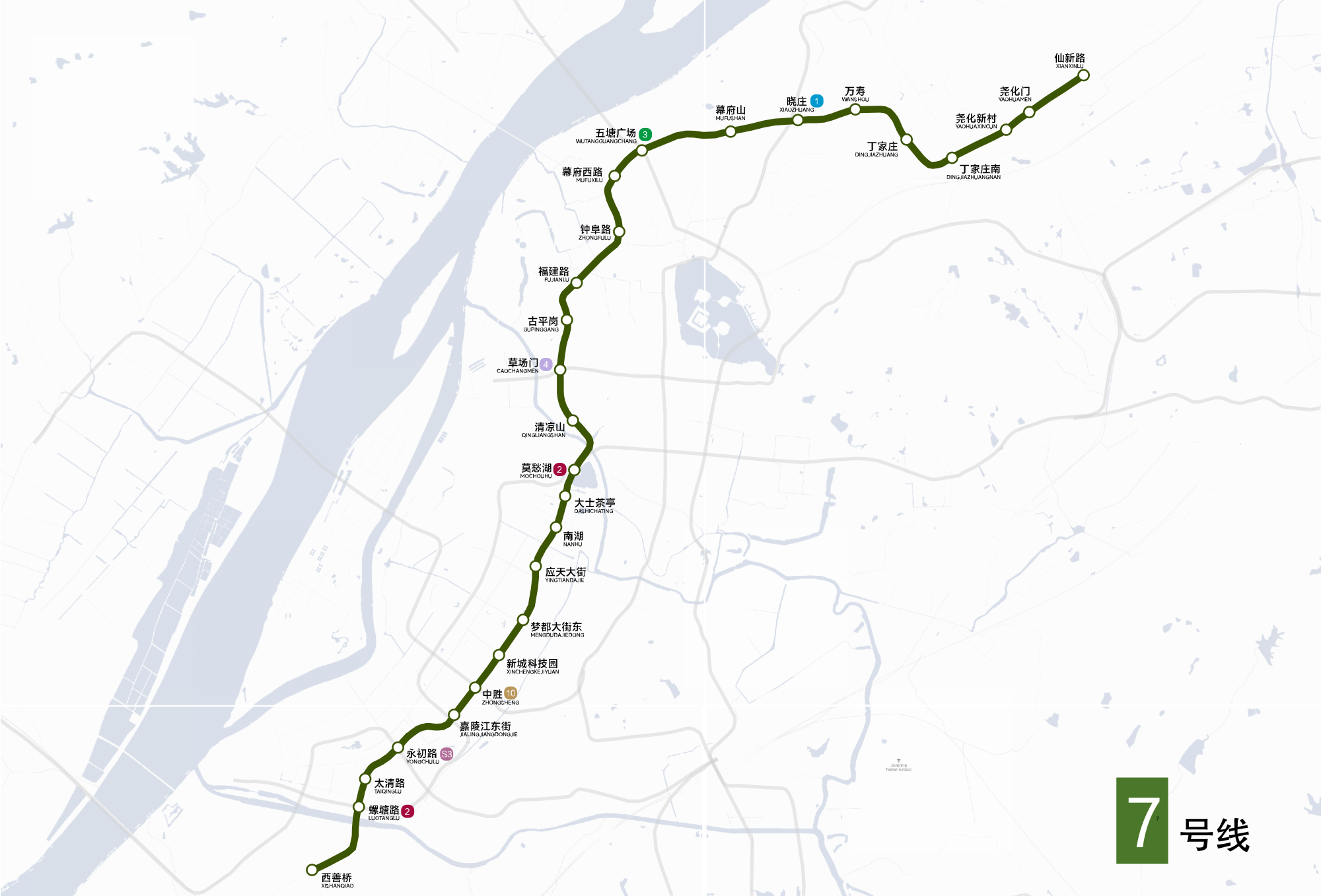

Station name		Connections	Distance km		Location
English	Chinese	Connections	Distance km		Location
Xianxinlu	仙新路		0.000	0.000	Qixia
Yaohuamen	尧化门		0.834	0.834	Qixia
Yaohuaxincun	尧化新村		1.402	2.236	Qixia
Dingjiazhuangnan	丁家庄南		1.765	4.001	Qixia
Dingjiazhuang	丁家庄		1.23	5.231	Qixia
Wanshou	万寿	6	2.002	7.233	Qixia
Xiaozhuang	晓庄	1	1.405	8.638	Qixia
Mufushan	幕府山		1.996	10.634	Gulou
Wutangguangchang	五塘广场	3	2.048	12.682	Gulou
Mufuxilu	幕府西路		0.821	13.503	Gulou
Zhongfulu	钟阜路	9	1.673	15.176	Gulou
Fujianlu	福建路	5	1.78	16.956	Gulou
Gupinggang	古平岗		1.174	18.13	Gulou
Caochangmen	草场门	4	1.167	19.297	Gulou
Qingliangshan	清凉山		1.526	20.823	Gulou
Mochouhu	莫愁湖	2	1.289	22.112	Jianye
Dashichating	大士茶亭		0.699	22.811	Jianye
Nanhu	南湖		0.911	23.722	Jianye
Yingtiandajie	应天大街		0.924	24.646	Jianye
Mengdudajiedong	梦都大街东		1.591	26.237	Jianye
Xinchengkejiyuan	新城科技园		1.161	27.398	Jianye
Zhongsheng	中胜	10	0.979	28.377	Jianye
Jialingjiangdongjie	嘉陵江东街		0.853	29.23	Jianye
Yongchulu	永初路	S3	1.755	30.985	Jianye
Taiqinglu	太清路		1.36	32.345	Jianye
Luotanglu	螺塘路	2	0.595	32.94	Jianye
Xishanqiao	西善桥	S2	2.052	34.992	Yuhuatai
