= Line 3 (Nanjing Metro) =

Metro line in Nanjing, China

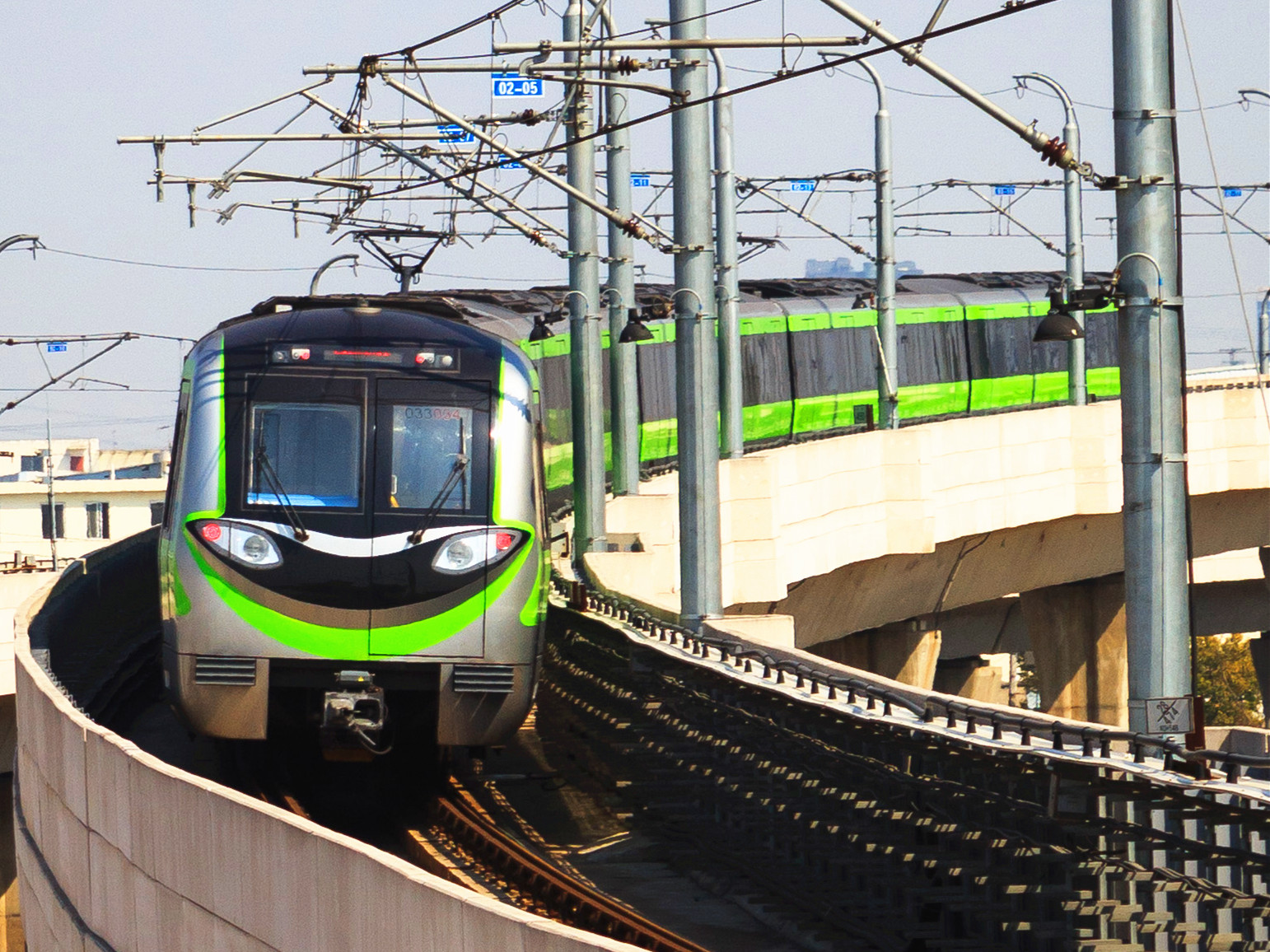
- Line 3 train

Overview
- Status: In operation
- Locale: Jiangning, Yuhuatai, Qinhuai, Xuanwu, Gulou and Pukou districts Nanjing, Jiangsu
- Termini: Linchang; Moling
- Stations: 31

Service
- Type: Rapid transit
- Rolling stock: CSR Nanjing Puzhen CIVAS
- Daily ridership: 503,000 (2015 Peak)

History
- Opened: 1 April 2015; 11 years ago

Technical
- Line length: 48.17 km (29.9 mi)
- Number of tracks: 2
- Character: Elevated & underground
- Track gauge: 1,435 mm (4 ft 8 1/2 in)
- Operating speed: 65 km/h (Normal), 80 km/h (Maximum)

Line 3 is a north–south line on the Nanjing Metro. The line opened on April 1, 2015, running from Linchang to Moling. Currently, the line contains 31 stations spanning a total of 48.17 kilometres (29.93 mi). Between Nanjing South Railway Station and Nanjing Railway Station, it runs parallel to Line 1.

Phase 3 of Line 3 started construction in 2021. The extension is 3.3 km with 2 new stations. It opened on December 19, 2025.

== Opening timeline ==
Segment	Commencement	Length	Station(s)	Name
Linchang — Mozhoudonglu	1 April 2015	44.87 km (27.88 mi)	28	Phase 1 & 2
Shangyuanmen	18 October 2015	Infill station	1	
Mozhoudonglu — Moling	19 December 2025	3.3 km (2.05 mi)	2	Phase 3

== Station list ==
Outdated, without the Moling extension.

Service routes		Station name		Connections	Distance km		Location
Service routes		English	Chinese	Connections	Distance km		Location
●	●	Linchang	林场		---	0.000	Pukou
●	●	Xinghuolu	星火路		2.537	2.537	Pukou
●	●	SEU Chengxian College	东大成贤学院		1.049	3.586	Pukou
●	●	Taifenglu	泰冯路	S8	1.127	4.713	Pukou
●	●	Tianruncheng	天润城		1.407	6.120	Pukou
●	●	Liuzhoudonglu	柳洲东路	11	1.854	7.974	Pukou
●	●	Shangyuanmen	上元门		3.535	11.509	Gulou
●	●	Wutangguangchang	五塘广场	7	0.961	12.470	Gulou
●	●	Xiaoshi	小市		1.845	14.315	Gulou
●	●	Nanjing Railway Station	南京站	1 9 NJH	1.379	15.694	Gulou / Xuanwu
●	●	NFU / Xinzhuang	南京林业大学·新庄		2.017	17.711	Xuanwu
●	●	Jimingsi	鸡鸣寺	4	2.851	20.562	Xuanwu
●	●	Fuqiao	浮桥		0.858	21.420	Xuanwu
●	●	Daxinggong	大行宫	2	0.859	22.279	Qinhuai / Xuanwu
●	●	Changfujie	常府街		0.931	23.210	Qinhuai
●	●	Fuzimiao	夫子庙	5	1.067	24.277	Qinhuai
●	●	Wudingmen	武定门		1.308	25.585	Qinhuai
●	●	Yuhuamen	雨花门		1.143	26.728	Qinhuai
●	●	Kazimen	卡子门	10	0.977	27.705	Qinhuai
●	●	Daminglu	大明路		1.153	28.858	Qinhuai
●	●	Mingfaguangchang	明发广场		1.137	29.995	Yuhuatai
●	●	Nanjing South Railway Station	南京南站	1 6 S1 S3; NKH	1.222	31.217	Yuhuatai / Jiangning
●	●	Hongyundadao	宏运大道		1.105	32.322	Jiangning
●	●	Shengtaixilu	胜太西路		1.826	34.148	Jiangning
●		Tianyuanxilu	天元西路		1.791	35.939	Jiangning
●		Jiulonghu	九龙湖		2.343	38.282	Jiangning
●		Chengxindadao	诚信大道	5	1.526	39.808	Jiangning
●		SEU Jiulonghu Campus	东大九龙湖校区		1.301	41.109	Jiangning
●		Mozhoudonglu	秣周东路		2.995	44.104	Jiangning
●		Shangqinhuaixi	上秦淮西				Jiangning
●		Moling	秣陵			47.140	Jiangning

== Future Development ==
Phase 4 of Line 3 is still planning, according to a Jiangbei New District plan map, line 3 will have a northern extension, through Nanjing North railway station to Hupoquan.
