= Xinghuolu station =

Nanjing Metro station

Xinghuolu 星火路
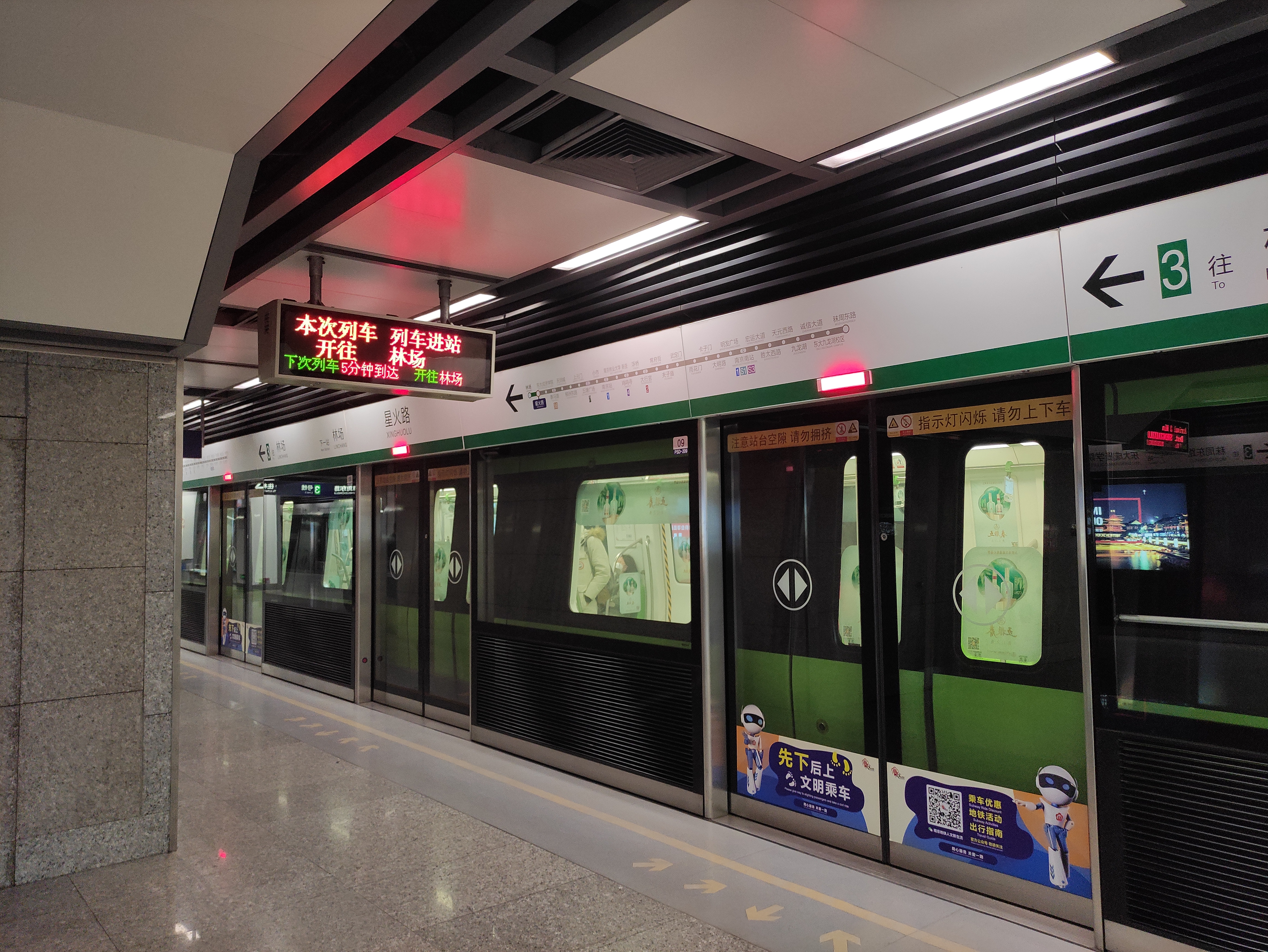

General information
- Location: Pukou District, Nanjing, Jiangsu; China
- Coordinates: 32°09′26″N 118°41′48″E)
- Operated by: Nanjing Metro Co. Ltd.
- Line: Line 3

Construction
- Structure type: Underground

Other information
- Station code: 302

History
- Opened: 1 April 2015

Services
Preceding station	Nanjing Metro	Following station
Linchang Terminus	Line 3	SEU Chengxian College towards Moling
Location

Xinghuolu station (Chinese: 星火路站; pinyin: Xīnghuǒlù Zhàn) is a station of Line 3 of the Nanjing Metro. It started operations on 1 April 2015.
