= Mozhoudonglu station =

Metro station in Nanjing, China

Mozhoudonglu 秣周东路
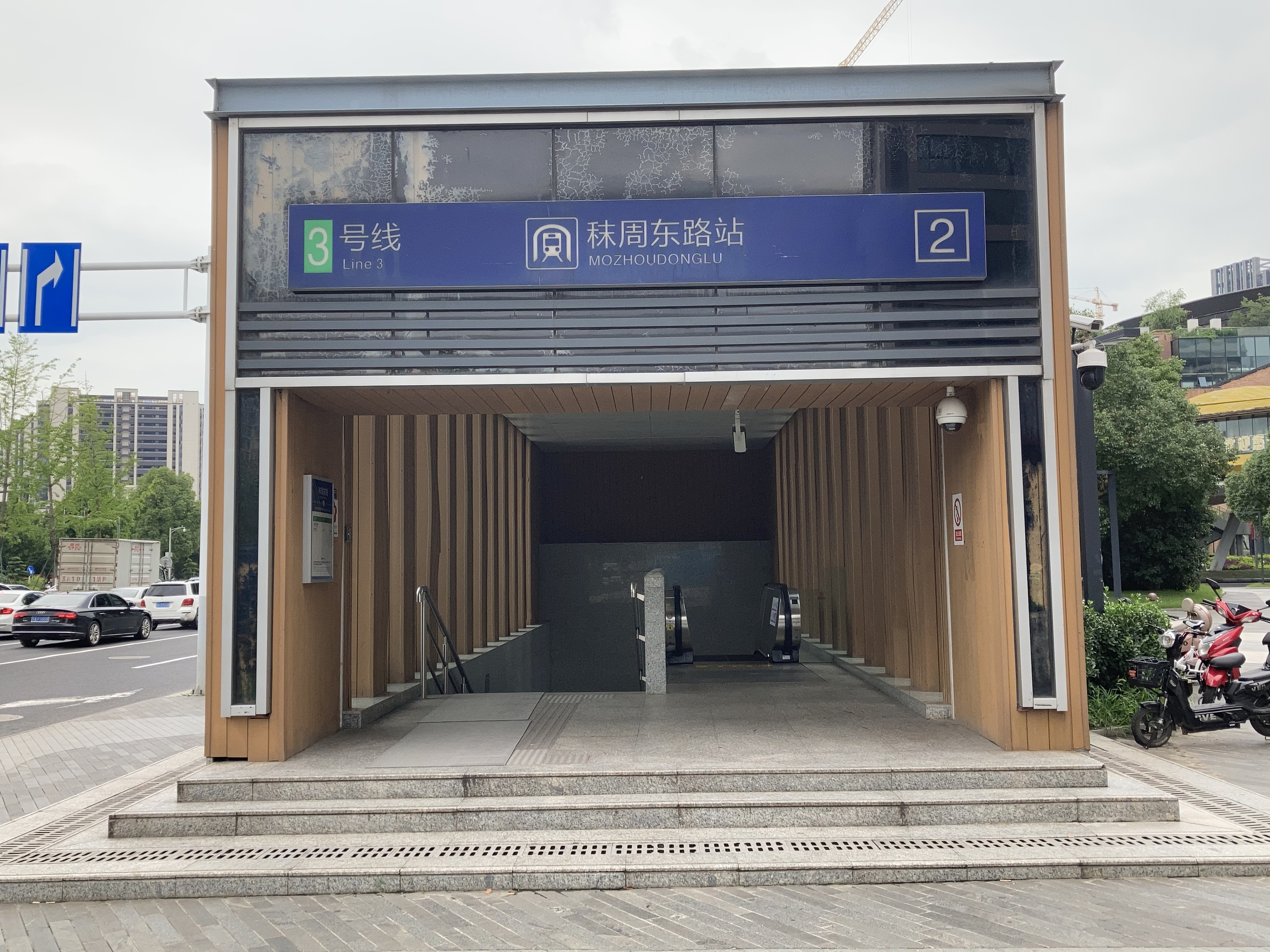

General information
- Location: Xuanwu District, Nanjing, Jiangsu; China
- Operated by: Nanjing Metro Co. Ltd.
- Line: Line 3

Construction
- Structure type: Underground

Other information
- Station code: 329

History
- Opened: 1 April 2015

Services
Preceding station	Nanjing Metro	Following station
SEU Jiulonghu Campus towards Linchang	Line 3	Shangqinhuaixi towards Moling
Location

Mozhoudonglu station (Chinese: 秣周东路站) is a station of Line 3 of the Nanjing Metro. It started operations on 1 April 2015. It was the southern terminus of Line 3 until the extension to Moling opened on 19 December 2025.
