= Linchang station =

Nanjing Metro station

Linchang 林场
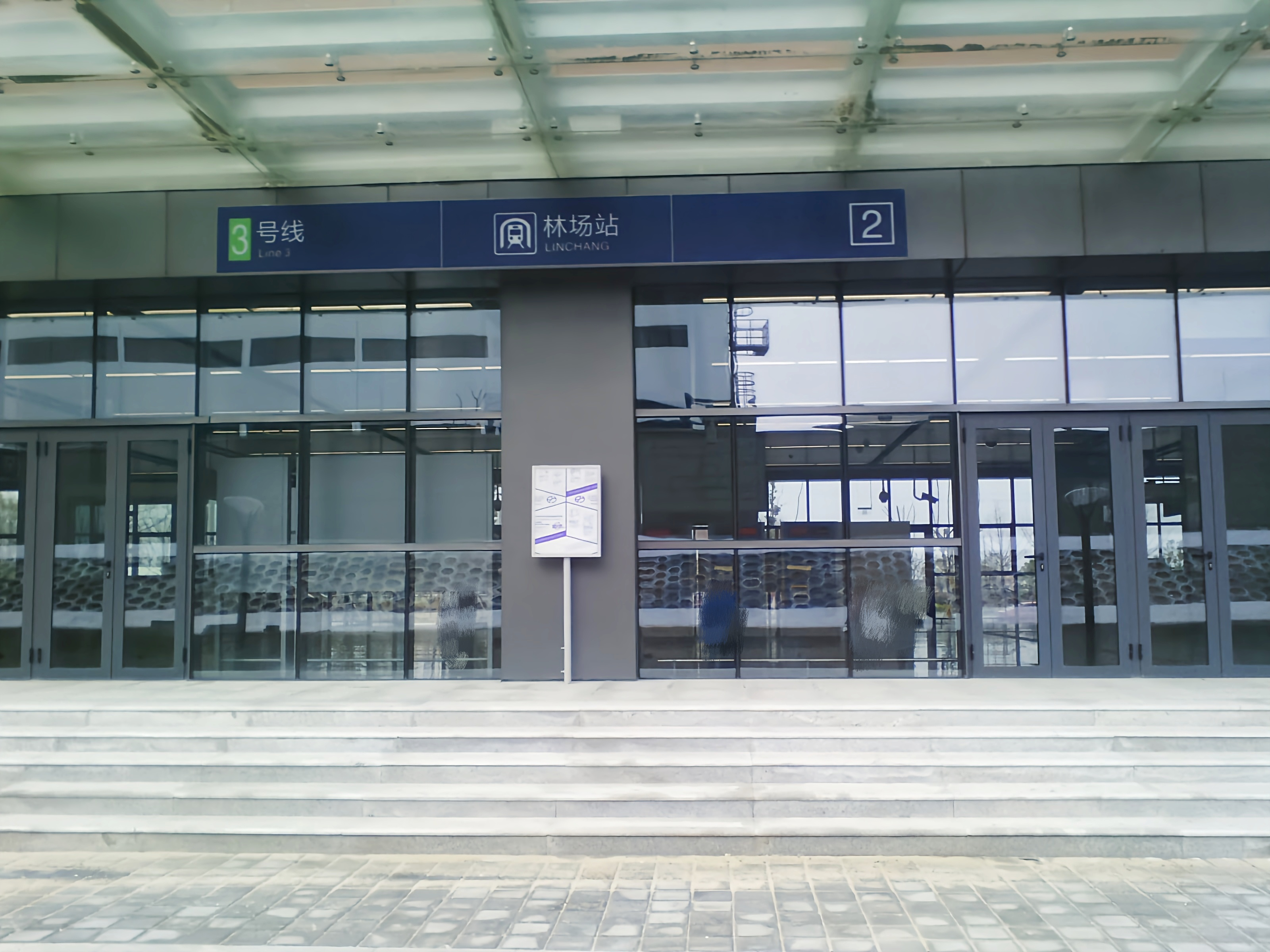

General information
- Location: Pusi Road and Longpan Road; Pukou District, Nanjing, Jiangsu; China
- Coordinates: 32°09′49″N 118°40′17″E)
- Operated by: Nanjing Metro Co. Ltd.
- Line: Line 3

Construction
- Structure type: Elevated

Other information
- Station code: 301

History
- Opened: 1 April 2015

Services
Preceding station	Nanjing Metro	Following station
Terminus	Line 3	Xinghuolu towards Mozhoudonglu
Location

Linchang station (simplified Chinese: 林场站; traditional Chinese: 林場站; pinyin: Línchǎng Zhàn) is a station of Line 3 of the Nanjing Metro. It started operations on 1 April 2015. It is named after the nearby Laoshan Forestry (老山林场), and located along the east-west Pusi Road (浦泗路) at its intersection with Longpan Road (龙盘路).
