= Changlu station =

Nanjing Metro station

Changlu 长芦

General information
- Location: Luhe District, Nanjing, Jiangsu; China
- Coordinates: 32.27974°N 118.78292°E
- Operated by: Nanjing Metro Co. Ltd.
- Line(s): Line S8

Construction
- Structure type: Elevated

History
- Opened: 1 August 2014

Services
Preceding station	Nanjing Metro	Following station
Getang towards Changjiangdaqiaobei	Line S8	Huagongyuan towards Jinniuhu
Location

Changlu station (Chinese: 长芦站) is a metro station of Line S8 of the Nanjing Metro. It started operations on 1 August 2014.
