= Huagongyuan station =

Nanjing Metro station

Coordinates: 32.2922°N 118.7920°E

Huagongyuan 化工园

General information
- Location: Luhe District, Nanjing, Jiangsu; China
- Operated by: Nanjing Metro Co. Ltd.
- Line: Line S8

Construction
- Structure type: Elevated

History
- Opened: 1 August 2014

Services
Preceding station	Nanjing Metro	Following station
Changlu towards Changjiangdaqiaobei	Line S8	Luhe Development Zone towards Jinniuhu
Location

Huagongyuan / Chemical Industrial Park station (Chinese: 化工园站) is a metro station of Line S8 of the Nanjing Metro. It started operations on 1 August 2014.
