= Dachang station =

Nanjing Metro station

Dachang 大厂
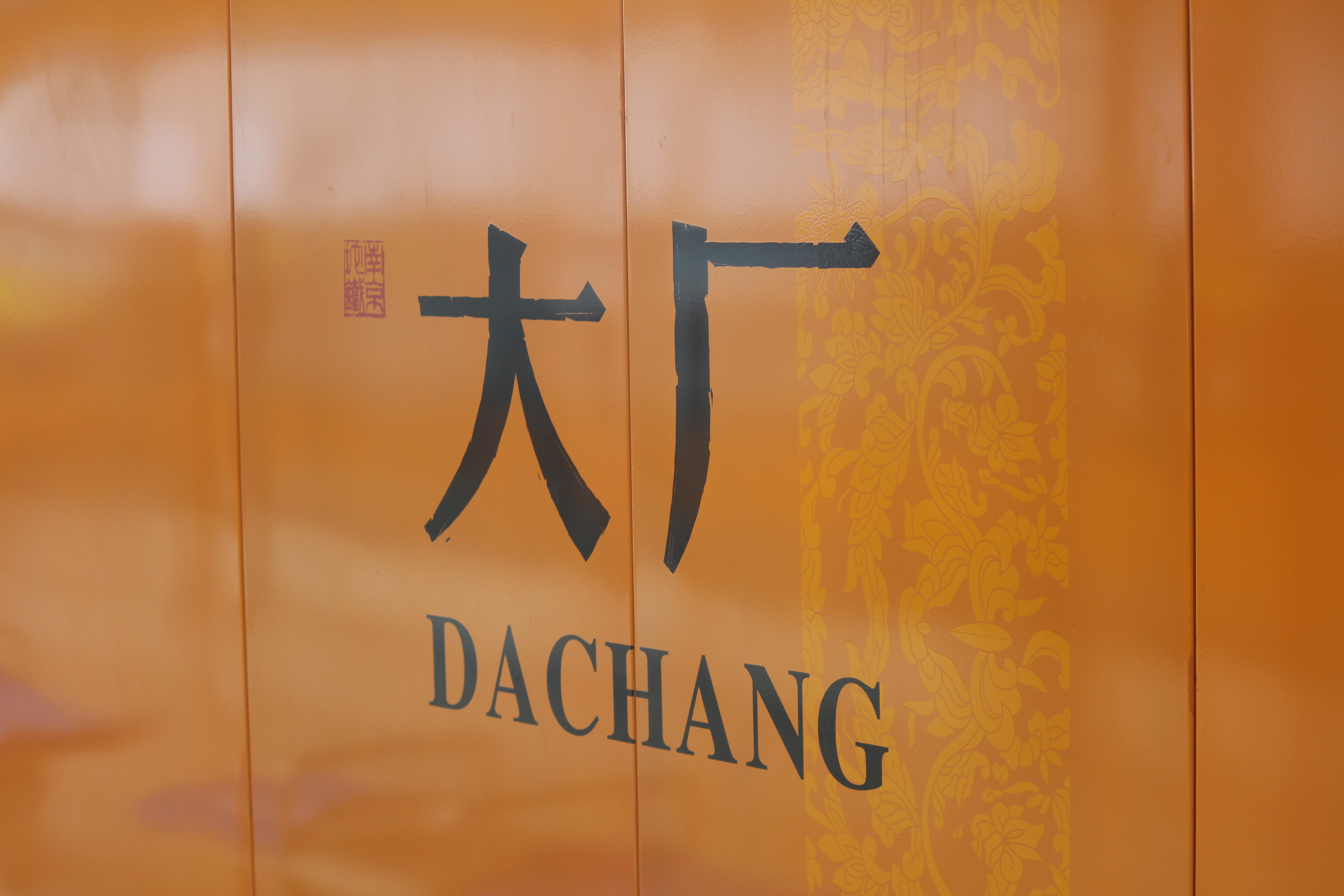

General information
- Location: Luhe District, Nanjing, Jiangsu; China
- Coordinates: 32.23461°N 118.74664°E
- Operated by: Nanjing Metro Co. Ltd.
- Line: Line S8

Construction
- Structure type: Elevated

History
- Opened: 1 August 2014

Services
Preceding station	Nanjing Metro	Following station
Xiejiadian towards Changjiangdaqiaobei	Line S8	Getang towards Jinniuhu
Location

Dachang station (Chinese: 大厂站) is a metro station of Line S8 of the Nanjing Metro. It started operations on 1 August 2014.
