= Shenqiao station (Nanjing Metro) =

Nanjing Metro station

Shenqiao 沈桥
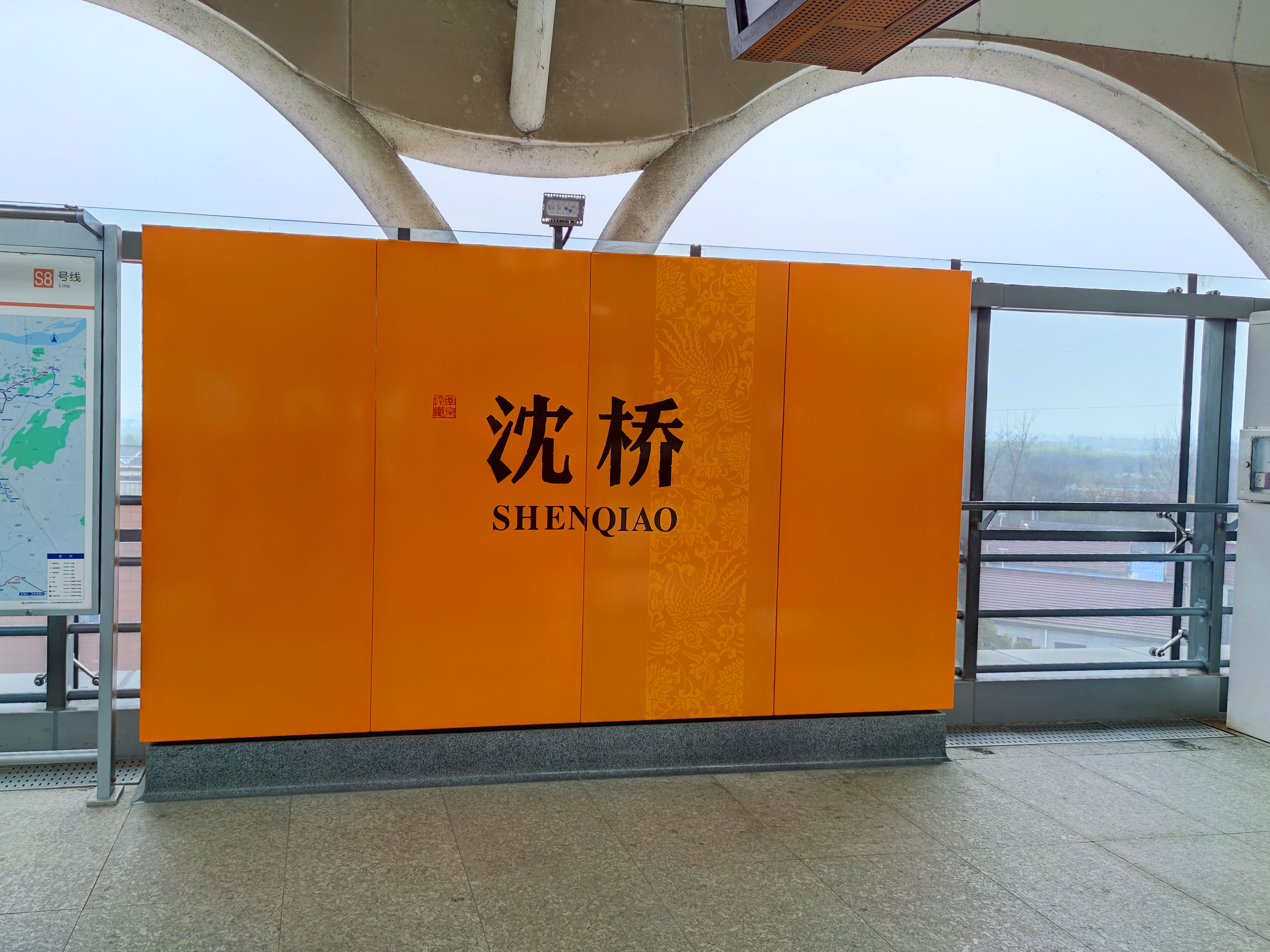

General information
- Location: Luhe District, Nanjing, Jiangsu; China
- Operated by: Nanjing Metro Co. Ltd.
- Line: Line S8

Construction
- Structure type: Elevated

History
- Opened: 1 August 2014

Services
Preceding station	Nanjing Metro	Following station
Fangzhouguangchang towards Changjiangdaqiaobei	Line S8	Babaiqiao towards Jinniuhu
Location

Shenqiao station (Chinese: 沈桥站) is a metro station on Line S8 of the Nanjing Metro. It started operations on 1 August 2014.
