= Longchi station =

Nanjing Metro station

Coordinates: 32.3252°N 118.8268°E

Longchi 龙池
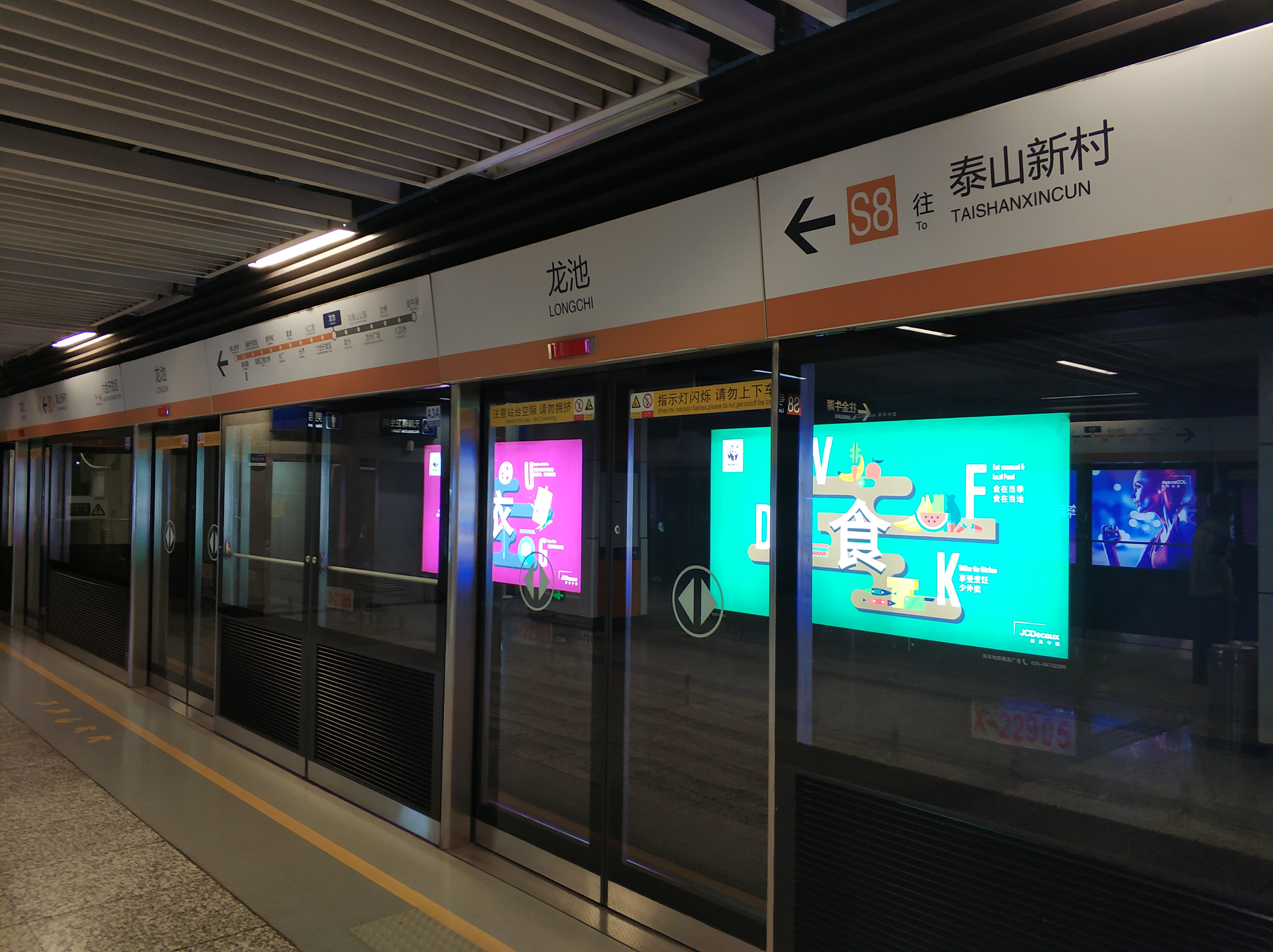

General information
- Location: Luhe District, Nanjing, Jiangsu; China
- Operated by: Nanjing Metro Co. Ltd.
- Line(s): Line S8

Construction
- Structure type: Underground

History
- Opened: 1 August 2014

Services
Preceding station	Nanjing Metro	Following station
Luhe Development Zone towards Changjiangdaqiaobei	Line S8	Xiongzhou towards Jinniuhu
Location

Longchi station (Chinese: 龙池站) is a metro station of Line S8 of the Nanjing Metro. It started operations on 1 August 2014.
