= Fenghuangshan Park station =

Nanjing Metro station

Fenghuangshan Park 凤凰山公园
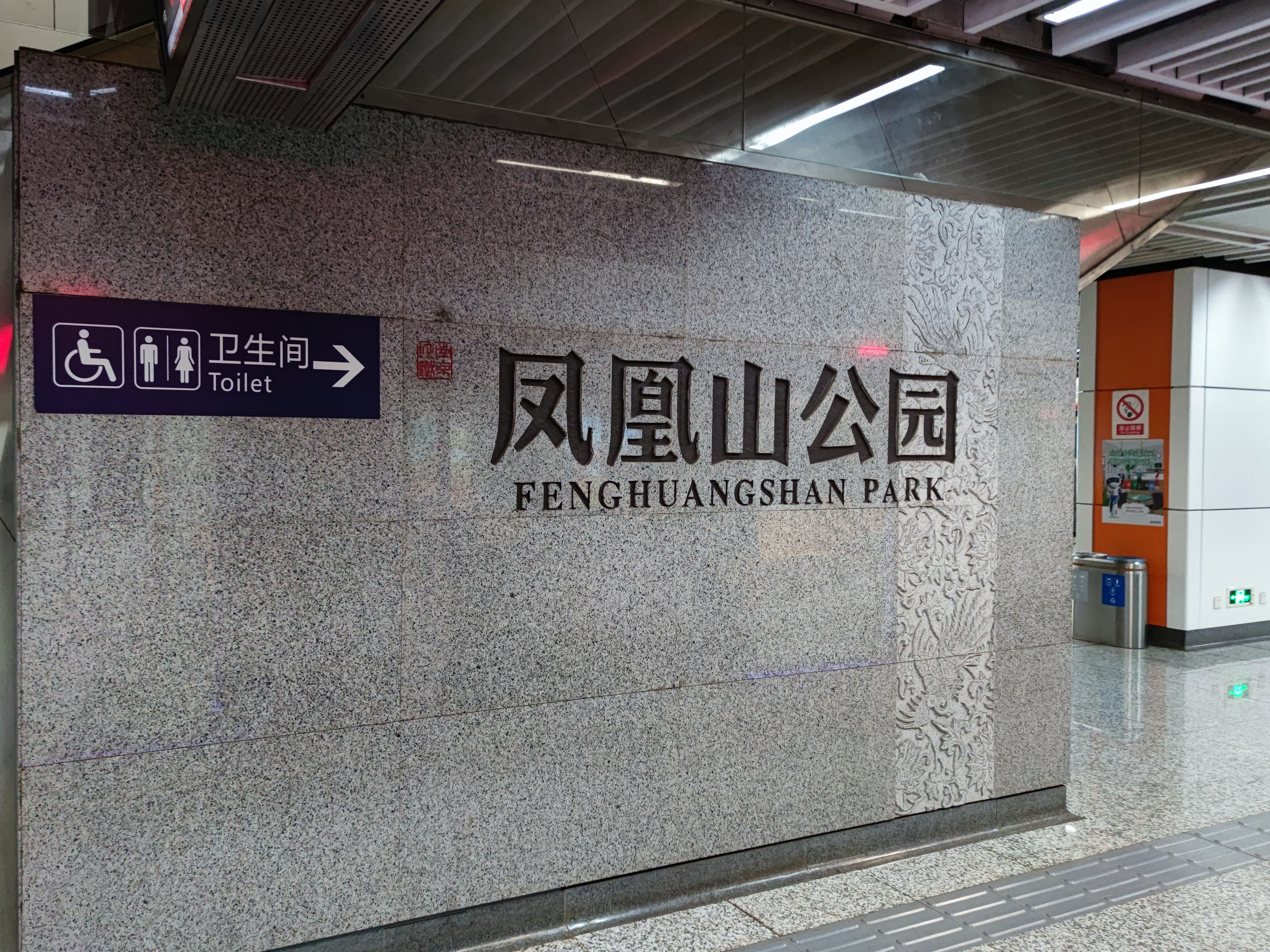

General information
- Location: Luhe District, Nanjing, Jiangsu; China
- Operated by: Nanjing Metro Co. Ltd.
- Line: Line S8

Construction
- Structure type: Underground

History
- Opened: 1 August 2014

Services
Preceding station	Nanjing Metro	Following station
Xiongzhou towards Changjiangdaqiaobei	Line S8	Fangzhouguangchang towards Jinniuhu
Location

Fenghuangshan Park Station (Chinese: 凤凰山公园站) is a metro station of Line S8 of the Nanjing Metro. It started operations on 1 August 2014.
