= Xiejiadian station =

Nanjing Metro station

Xiejiadian 卸甲甸
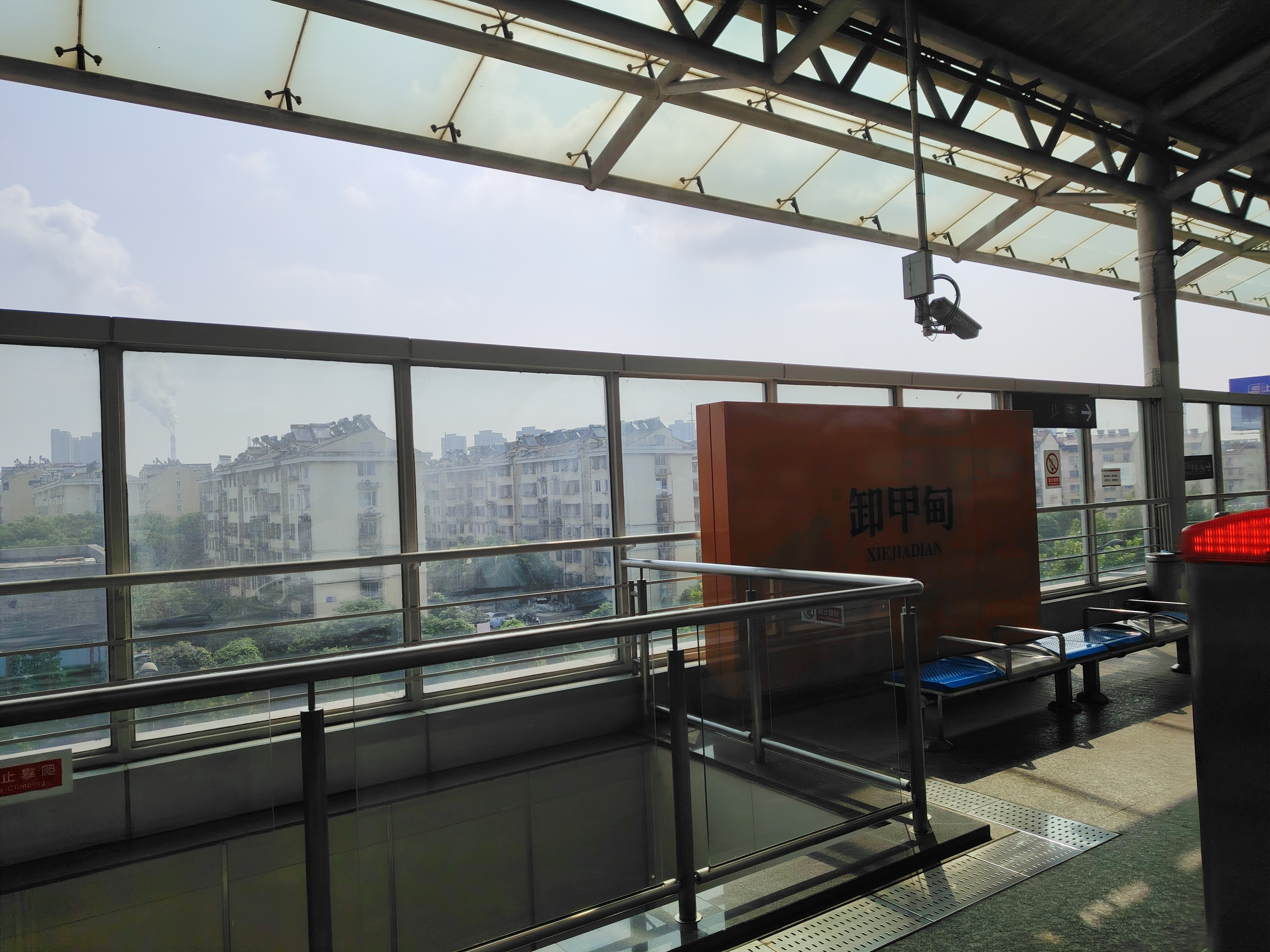

General information
- Location: Luhe District, Nanjing, Jiangsu; China
- Coordinates: 32.22°N 118.74°E
- Operated by: Nanjing Metro Co. Ltd.
- Line: Line S8

Construction
- Structure type: Elevated

History
- Opened: 1 August 2014

Services
Preceding station	Nanjing Metro	Following station
NUIST towards Changjiangdaqiaobei	Line S8	Dachang towards Jinniuhu
Location

Xiejiadian station (Chinese: 卸甲甸站) is a metro station of Line S8 of the Nanjing Metro. It started operations on 1 August 2014.
