= Xiongzhou station =

Nanjing Metro station

Xiongzhou 雄州
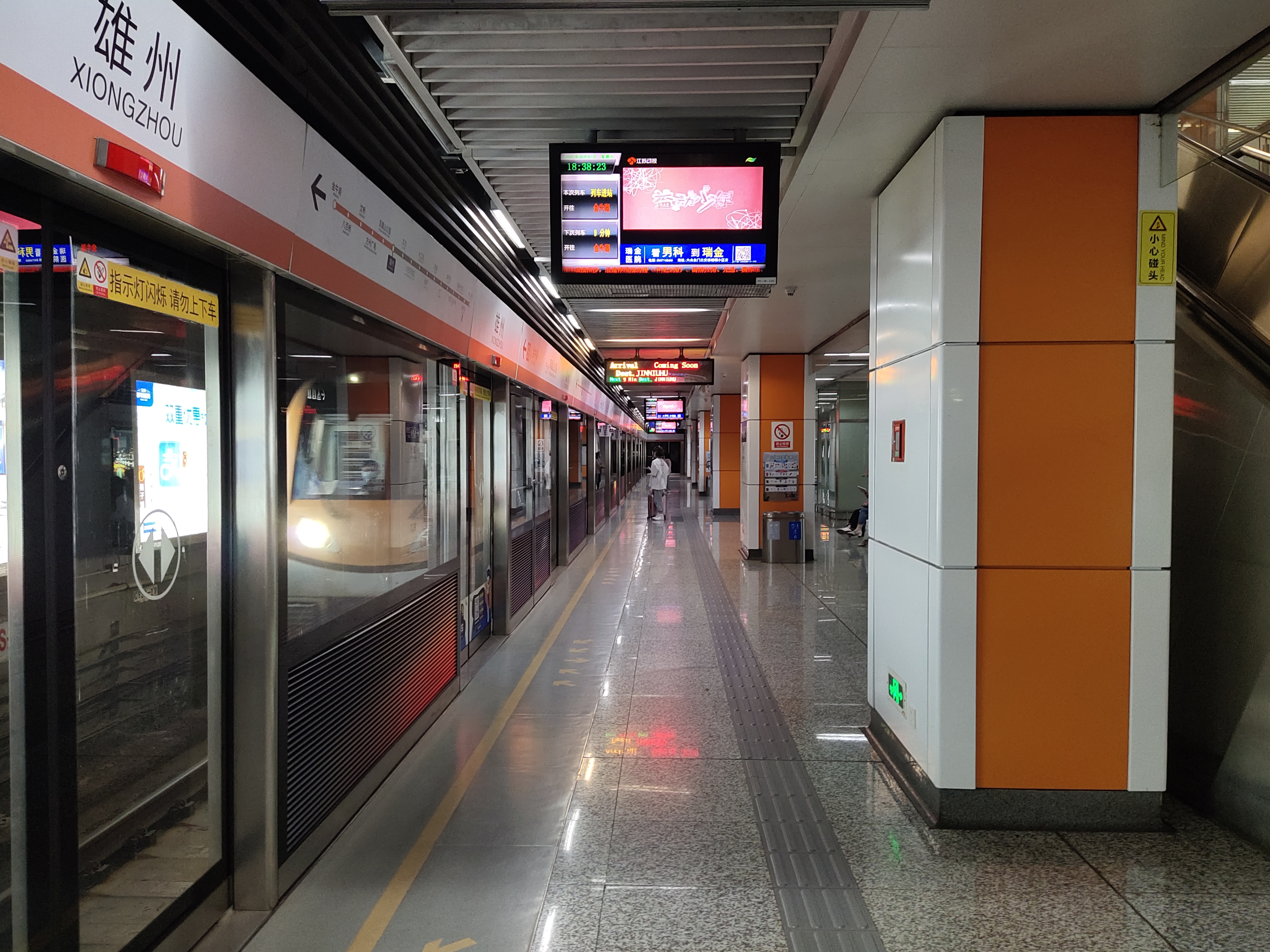

General information
- Location: Luhe District, Nanjing, Jiangsu; China
- Coordinates: 32.34°N 118.84°E
- Operated by: Nanjing Metro Co. Ltd.
- Line(s): Line S8

Construction
- Structure type: Underground

History
- Opened: 1 August 2014

Services
Preceding station	Nanjing Metro	Following station
Longchi towards Changjiangdaqiaobei	Line S8	Fenghuangshan Park towards Jinniuhu
Location

Xiongzhou station (Chinese: 雄州站) is a metro station of Line S8 of the Nanjing Metro. It started operations on 1 August 2014.
