= Fangzhouguangchang station =

Nanjing Metro station

Fangzhouguangchang 方州广场
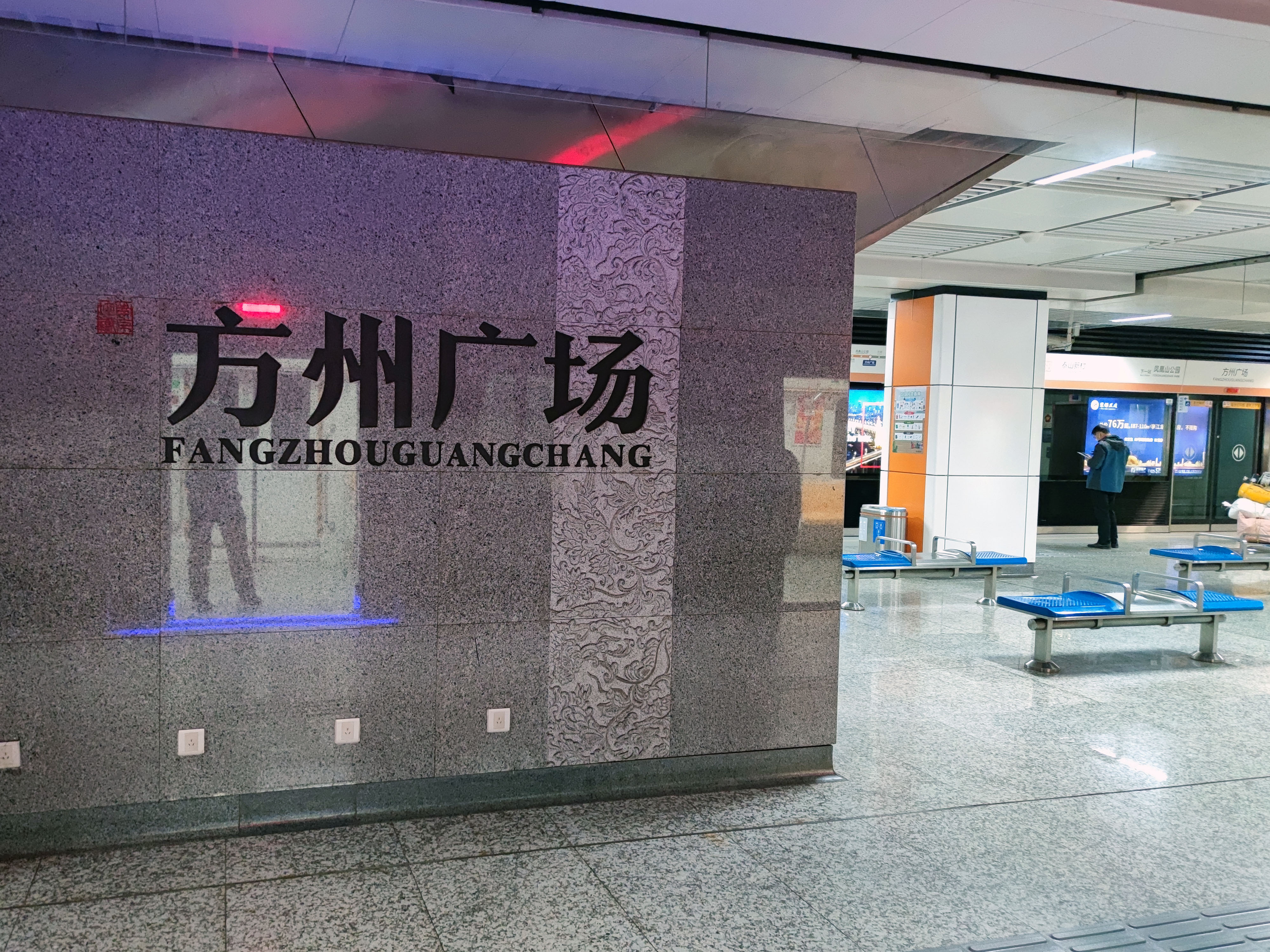

General information
- Location: Luhe District, Nanjing, Jiangsu; China
- Operated by: Nanjing Metro Co. Ltd.
- Line: Line S8

Construction
- Structure type: Underground

History
- Opened: 1 August 2014

Services
Preceding station	Nanjing Metro	Following station
Fenghuangshan Park towards Changjiangdaqiaobei	Line S8	Shenqiao towards Jinniuhu
Location

Fangzhouguangchang station (Chinese: 方州广场站) is a metro station of Line S8 of the Nanjing Metro. It started operations on 1 August 2014.
