= Getang station =

Nanjing Metro station

Coordinates: 32.2502°N 118.7602°E

Getang 葛塘
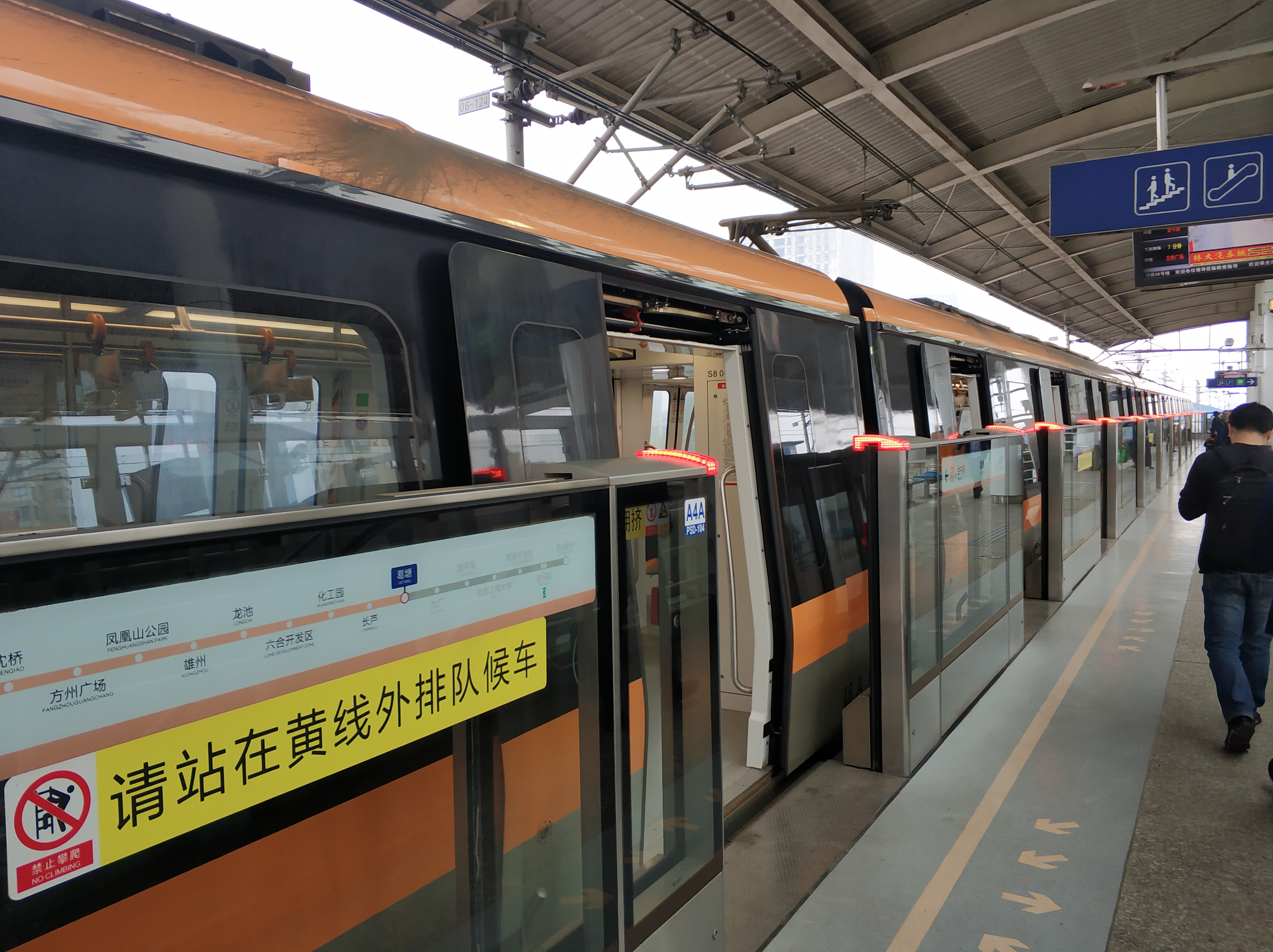

General information
- Location: Luhe District, Nanjing, Jiangsu; China
- Operated by: Nanjing Metro Co. Ltd.
- Line(s): Line S8

Construction
- Structure type: Elevated

History
- Opened: 1 August 2014

Services
Preceding station	Nanjing Metro	Following station
Dachang towards Changjiangdaqiaobei	Line S8	Changlu towards Jinniuhu
Location

Getang station (Chinese: 葛塘站) is a metro station of Line S8 of the Nanjing Metro. It started operations on 1 August 2014.
