= Nanjing University of Information Science and Technology station =

Nanjing Metro station

Coordinates: 32°13′N 118°44′E

NUIST 信息工程大学
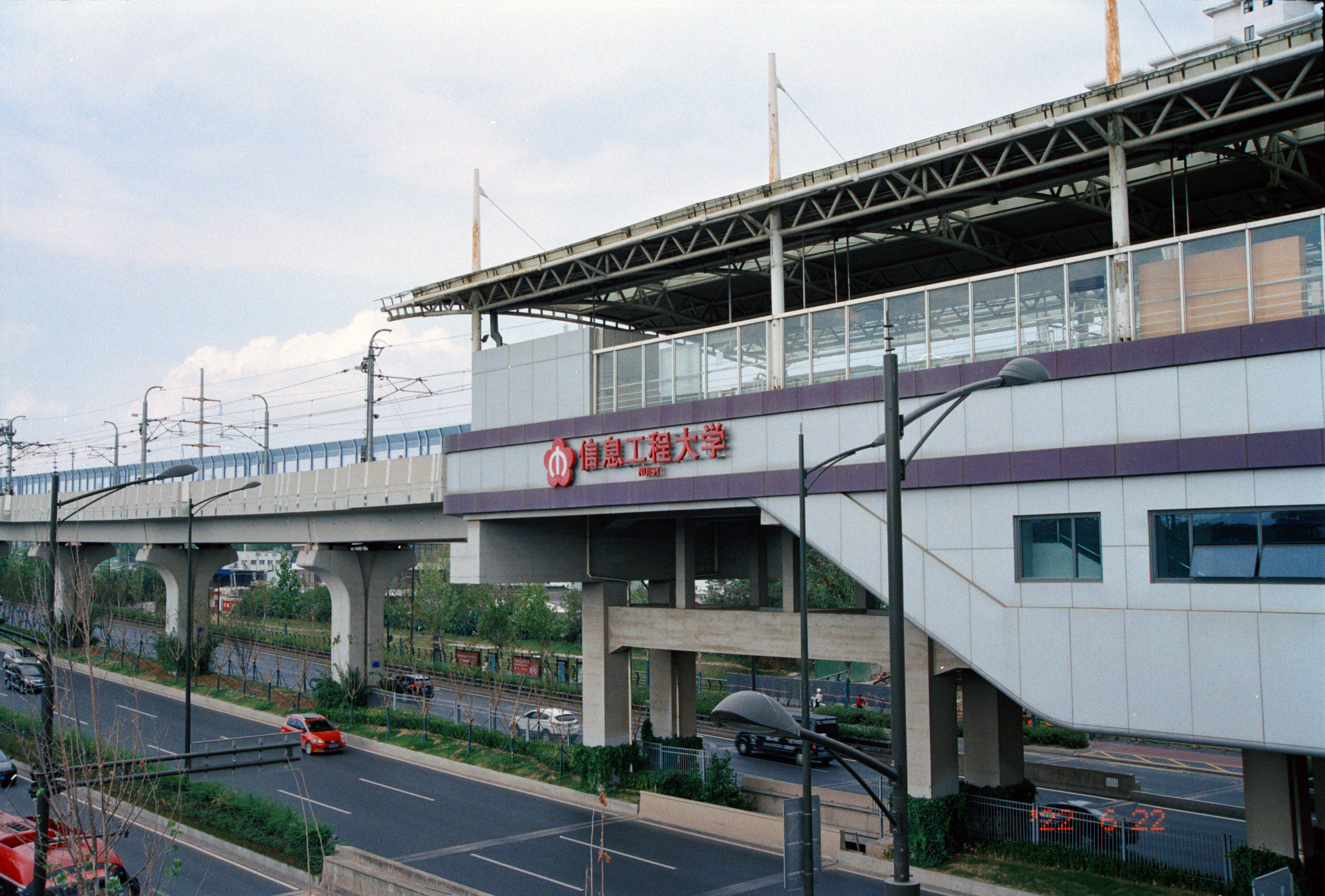

General information
- Location: Pukou District, Nanjing, Jiangsu; China
- Operated by: Nanjing Metro Co. Ltd.
- Line: Line S8

Construction
- Structure type: Elevated

History
- Opened: 1 August 2014

Services
Preceding station	Nanjing Metro	Following station
Gaoxin Development Zone towards Changjiangdaqiaobei	Line S8	Xiejiadian towards Jinniuhu
Location

NUIST station (Chinese: 信息工程大学站) is a metro station of Line S8 of the Nanjing Metro. It started operations on 1 August 2014. This station is near Nanjing University of Information Science and Technology.
