= Line S8 (Nanjing Metro) =

Metro line in Nanjing, China

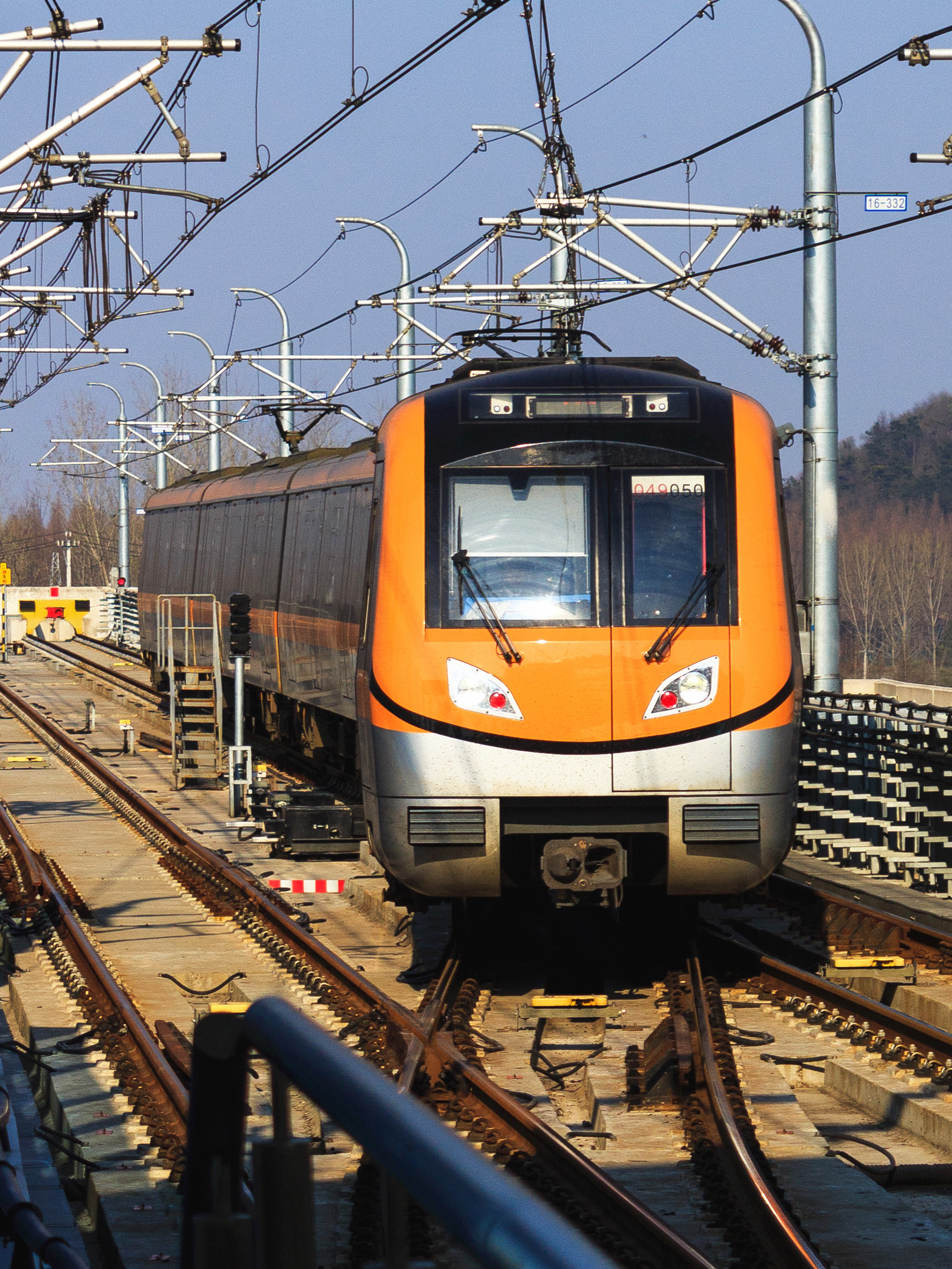
- A Line S8 train approaching Jinniuhu station

Overview
- Other names: Luhe line Nanjing–Tianchang intercity railway Ningtian intercity railway (Note: "Ning" (宁), is the standard Chinese abbreviation for Nanjing. It comes from the name "Jiangning" (江宁) that the city had in the early Qing.)
- Status: In operation
- Locale: Pukou and Luhe districts Nanjing, Jiangsu
- Termini: Jinniuhu; Changjiangdaqiaobei
- Stations: 19

Service
- Type: Rapid transit
- Operator(s): Nanjing Metro

History
- Opened: 1 August 2014; 11 years ago

Technical
- Line length: 47.288 km (29.4 mi)
- Number of tracks: 2
- Character: Underground and elevated
- Track gauge: 1,435 mm (4 ft 8 1/2 in)

Line S8 of the Nanjing Metro (Chinese: 南京地铁S8号线; pinyin: Nánjīng Dìtiě S-Bā Hào Xiàn), is a north–south suburban metro line serving the northern suburbs of Nanjing. Currently, the line runs from Jinniuhu to Changjiangdaqiaobei. It will eventually extended to Tianchang in Anhui.

== Opening timeline ==
Segment	Commencement	Length	Station(s)	Name
Jinniuhu — Taishanxincun	1 August 2014	45.2 km (28.1 mi)	17	Phase 1
Taishanxincun — Changjiangdaqiaobei	30 September 2022	2.072 km (1.3 mi)	2	South extension

== Station list ==
Service routes		Station name		Connections	Distance km		Location
Service routes		English	Chinese	Connections	Distance km		Location
●	●	Changjiangdaqiaobei	长江大桥北	11			Pukou
●	●	Maofangchanglu	毛纺厂路				Pukou
●	●	Taishanxincun	泰山新村		0.000	0.000	Pukou
●	●	Taifenglu	泰冯路	3	1.236	1.236	Pukou
●	●	Gaoxin Development Zone	高新开发区		2.741	3.977	Pukou
●	●	NUIST	信息工程大学		2.830	6.807	Pukou
●	●	Xiejiadian	卸甲甸		1.401	8.208	Luhe
●	●	Dachang	大厂		1.829	10.037	Luhe
●	●	Getang	葛塘		2.151	12.188	Luhe
●	●	Changlu	长芦		3.880	16.068	Luhe
●	●	Huagongyuan	化工园		1.567	17.635	Luhe
●	●	Luhe Development Zone	六合开发区		2.893	20.528	Luhe
●	●	Longchi	龙池		2.077	22.605	Luhe
●	●	Xiongzhou	雄州		2.375	24.980	Luhe
●	●	Fenghuangshan Park	凤凰山公园		1.606	26.586	Luhe
●	●	Fangzhouguangchang	方州广场		1.475	28.061	Luhe
●		Shenqiao	沈桥		6.112	34.173	Luhe
●		Babaiqiao	八百桥		4.971	39.144	Luhe
●		Jinniuhu	金牛湖		5.475	44.619	Luhe
