= Gaoxin Development Zone station =

Nanjing Metro station

Gaoxin Development Zone 高新开发区
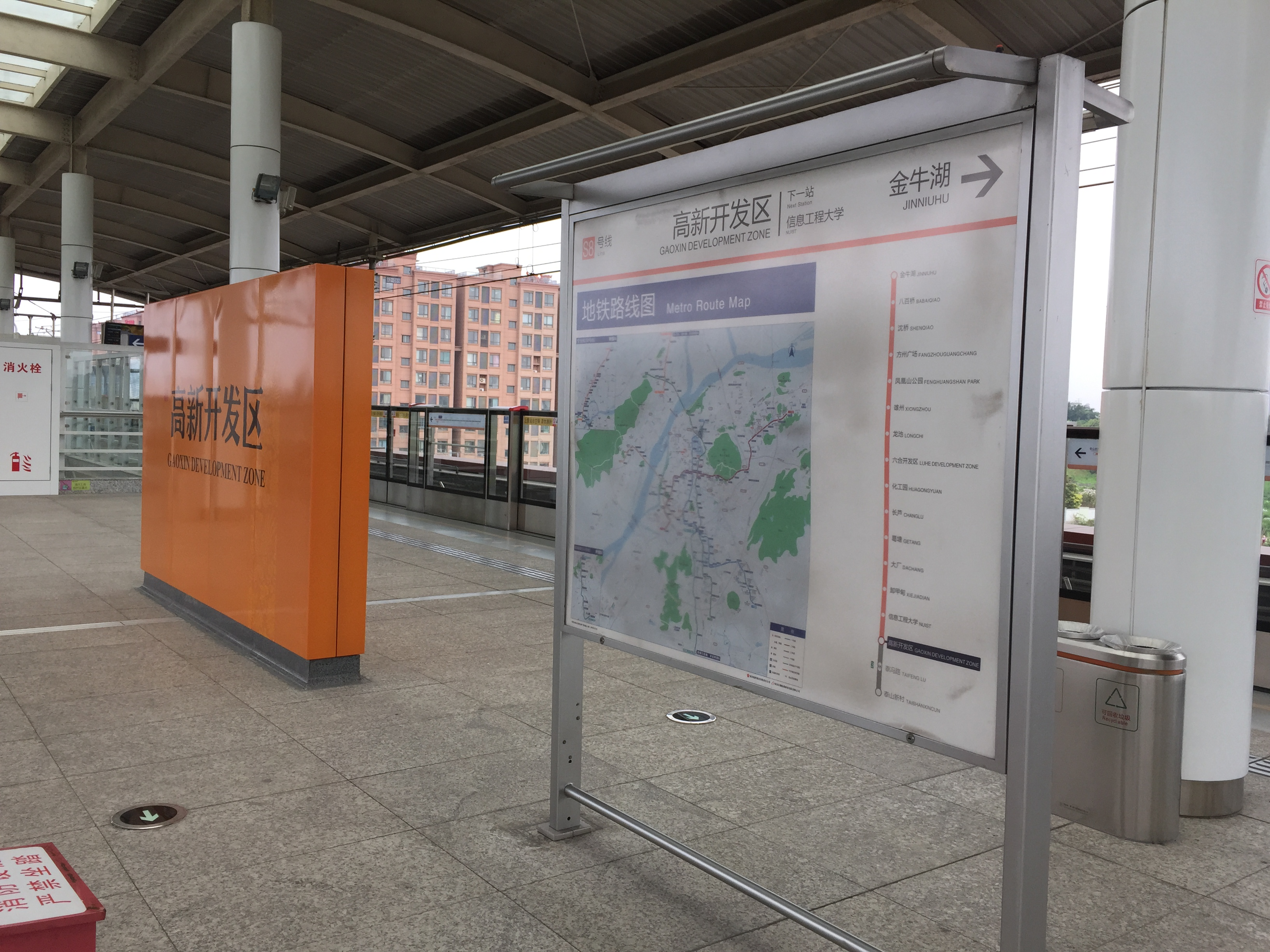

General information
- Location: Pukou District, Nanjing, Jiangsu; China
- Coordinates: 32.1798°N 118.7144°E
- Operated by: Nanjing Metro Co. Ltd.
- Line: Line S8

Construction
- Structure type: Elevated

History
- Opened: 1 August 2014

Services
Preceding station	Nanjing Metro	Following station
Taifenglu towards Changjiangdaqiaobei	Line S8	NUIST towards Jinniuhu
Location

Gaoxin Development Zone station (Chinese: 高新开发区站) is a metro station of Line S8 of the Nanjing Metro. It started operations on 1 August 2014.
