= Taifenglu station =

Nanjing Metro interchange station

Taifenglu 泰冯路
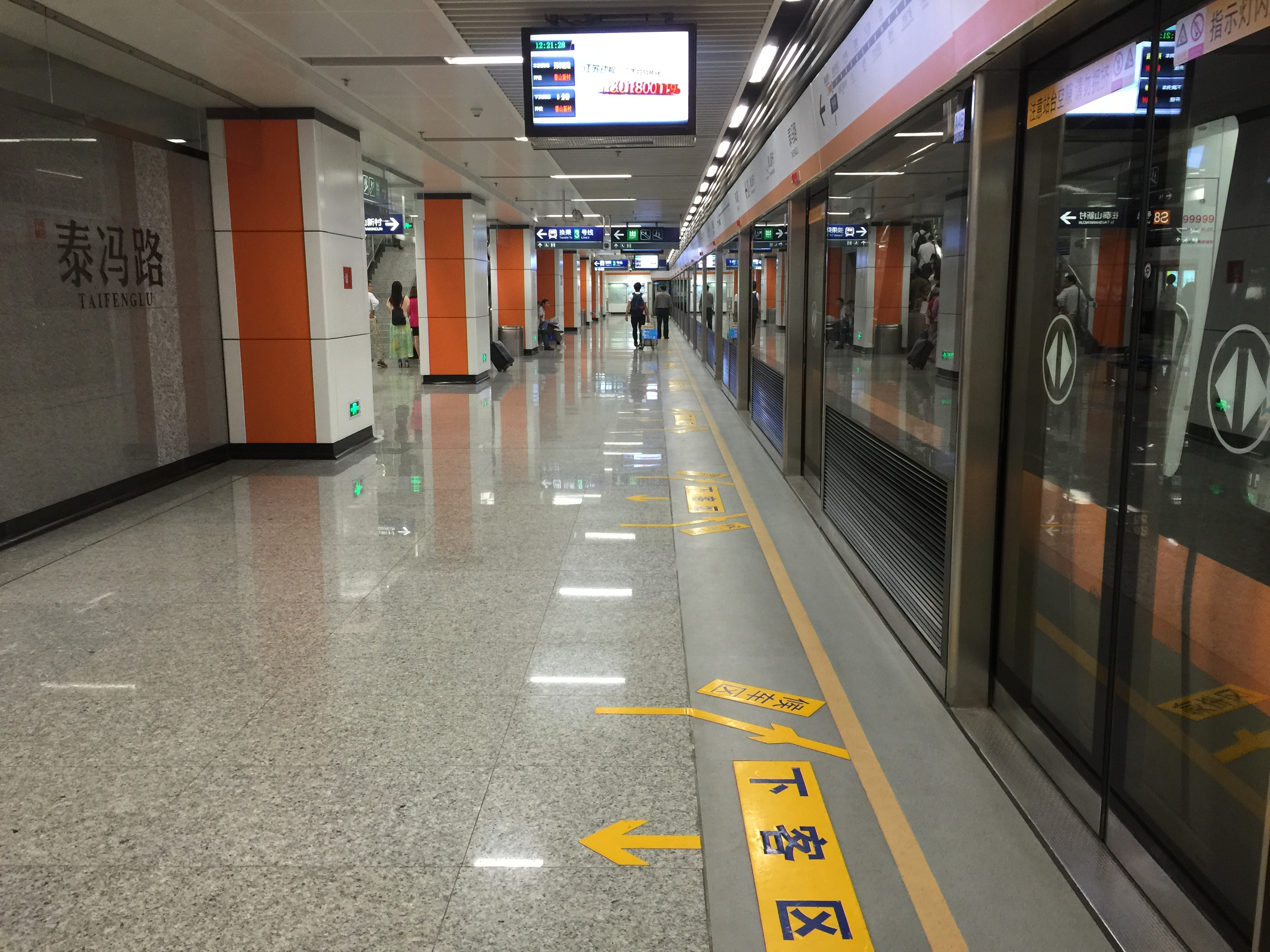
- Platform for Line S8

General information
- Location: Pukou District, Nanjing, Jiangsu; China
- Coordinates: 32°09′12″N 118°43′08″E)
- Operated by: Nanjing Metro Co. Ltd.
- Lines: Line 3; Line S8

Construction
- Structure type: Underground

Other information
- Station code: 304 (Line 3)

History
- Opened: 1 August 2014 (Line S8); 1 April 2015 (Line 3)

Services
Preceding station	Nanjing Metro	Following station
SEU Chengxian College towards Linchang	Line 3	Tianruncheng towards Mozhoudonglu
Taishanxincun towards Changjiangdaqiaobei	Line S8	Gaoxin Development Zone towards Jinniuhu
Location

Taifenglu station (simplified Chinese: 泰冯路站; traditional Chinese: 泰馮路站; pinyin: Tàifénglù Zhàn; lit. 'Taifeng Road') is an interchange station of Line 3 and Line S8 of the Nanjing Metro. It began operations on Line S8, or the Ningtian (Nanjing–Tianchang) intercity railway, on 1 August 2014 along with the rest of Phase I of that line from Taishanxincun to Jinniuhu; the interchange with Line 3 opened on 1 April 2015.
