= Taishanxincun station =

Nanjing Metro station

Taishanxincun 泰山新村
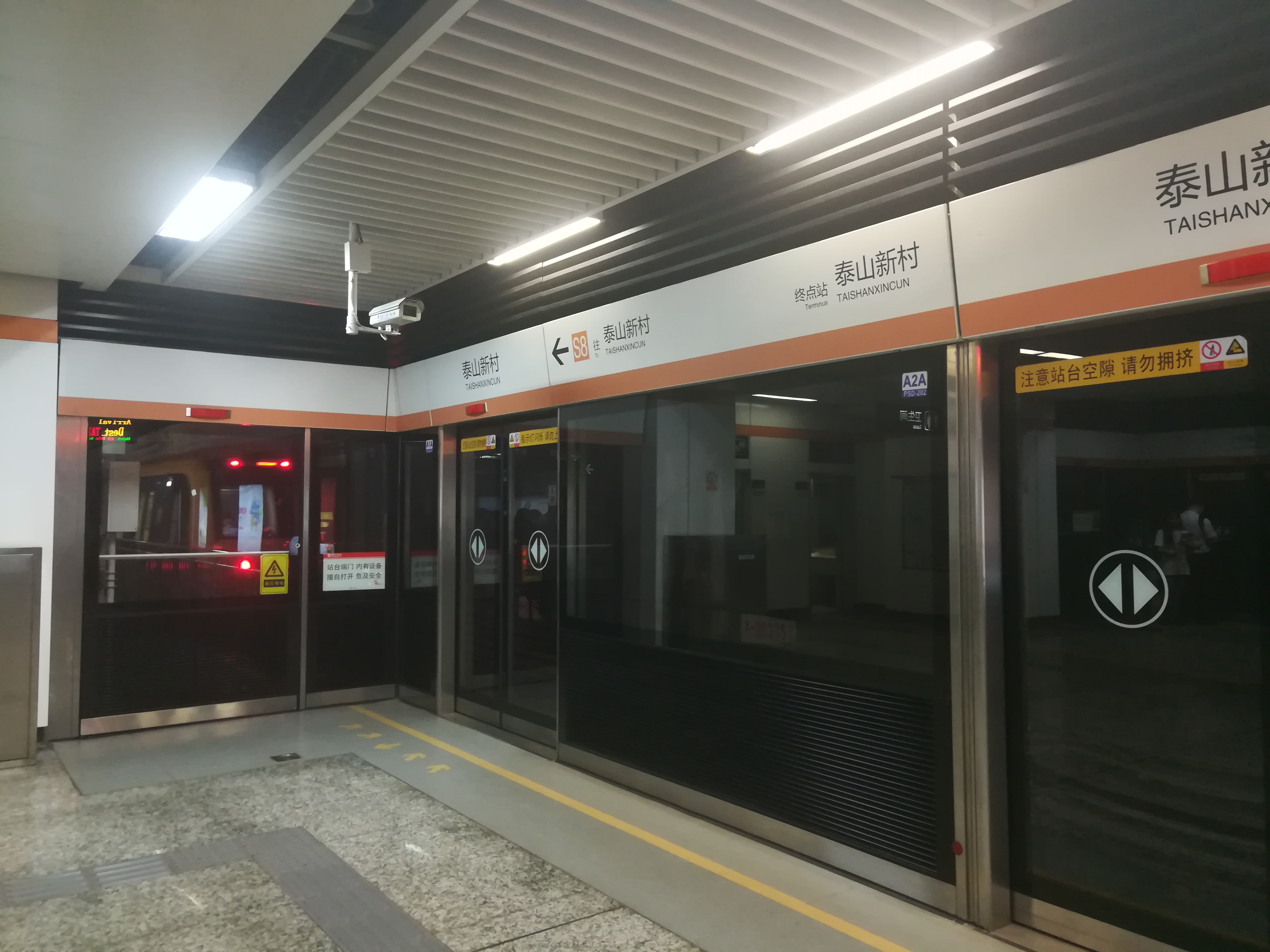

General information
- Location: Pukou District, Nanjing, Jiangsu; China
- Operated by: Nanjing Metro Co. Ltd.
- Line: Line S8

Construction
- Structure type: Underground

History
- Opened: 1 August 2014

Services
Preceding station	Nanjing Metro	Following station
Maofangchanglu towards Changjiangdaqiaobei	Line S8	Taifenglu towards Jinniuhu
Location

Taishanxincun station (Chinese: 泰山新村站) is a metro station of Line S8 of the Nanjing Metro. It started operations on 1 August 2014.
