= Longpao Subdistrict =

Longpao Subdistrict 龙袍街道
- Subdistrict
- Location in Jiangsu
- Coordinates: 32°12′17″N 118°56′57″E
- Country: People's Republic of China
- Province: Jiangsu
- Prefecture-level city: Nanjing
- District: Luhe District
- Time zone: UTC+8 (China Standard)

Longpao Subdistrict (simplified Chinese: 龙袍街道; traditional Chinese: 龍袍街道; pinyin: Lóngpáo Jiēdào) is a subdistrict in Luhe District, Nanjing, Jiangsu province, China. As of 2018, it has 6 residential communities and 5 villages under its administration.

== See also ==
- List of township-level divisions of Jiangsu
