= Babaiqiao station =

Nanjing Metro station

Coordinates: 32.4332°N 118.9396°E

Babaiqiao 八百桥
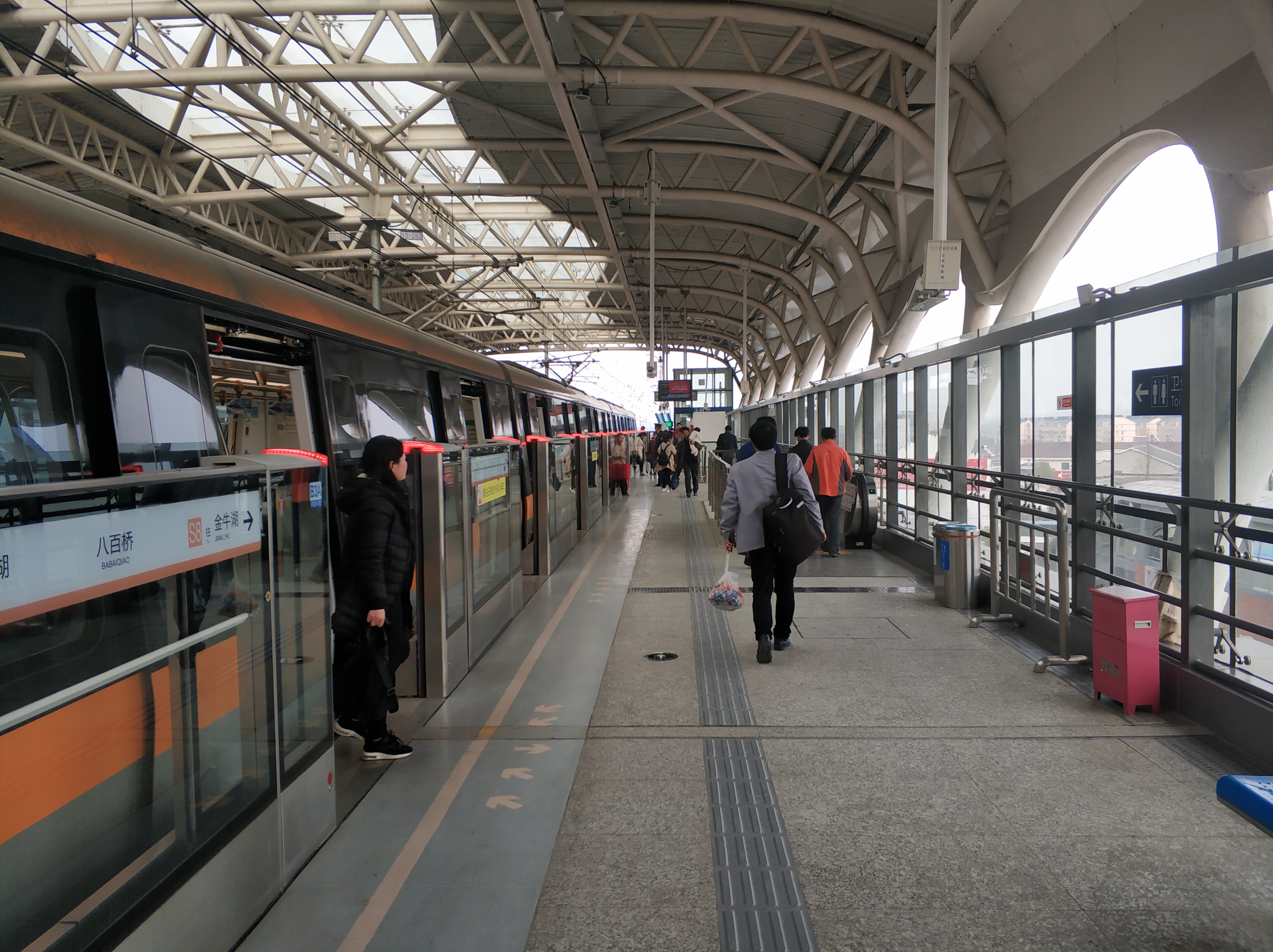

General information
- Location: Luhe District, Nanjing, Jiangsu; China
- Operated by: Nanjing Metro Co. Ltd.
- Line(s): Line S8

Construction
- Structure type: Elevated

History
- Opened: 1 August 2014

Services
Preceding station	Nanjing Metro	Following station
Shenqiao towards Changjiangdaqiaobei	Line S8	Jinniuhu Terminus
Location

Babaiqiao station (Chinese: 八百桥站) is a metro station on Line S8 of the Nanjing Metro. It started operations on 1 August 2014.
