= Shenqiao station =

Shenqiao station may refer to the following stations:

- Shenqiao station (Nanjing Metro), a station on Line S8 of the Nanjing Metro in China
- Shenqiao station (Nanchang Metro), a station on Line 2 of the Nanchang Metro in China
