= Maji, Luhe District =

Town in Nanjing, China

Maji town (马集镇) is located in the north of the Luhe District of Nanjing, Jiangsu, China. The population of Maji is 44,000. There are 20 villages in Maji.
