= Zhu Xun =

Chinese television host

- 朱迅
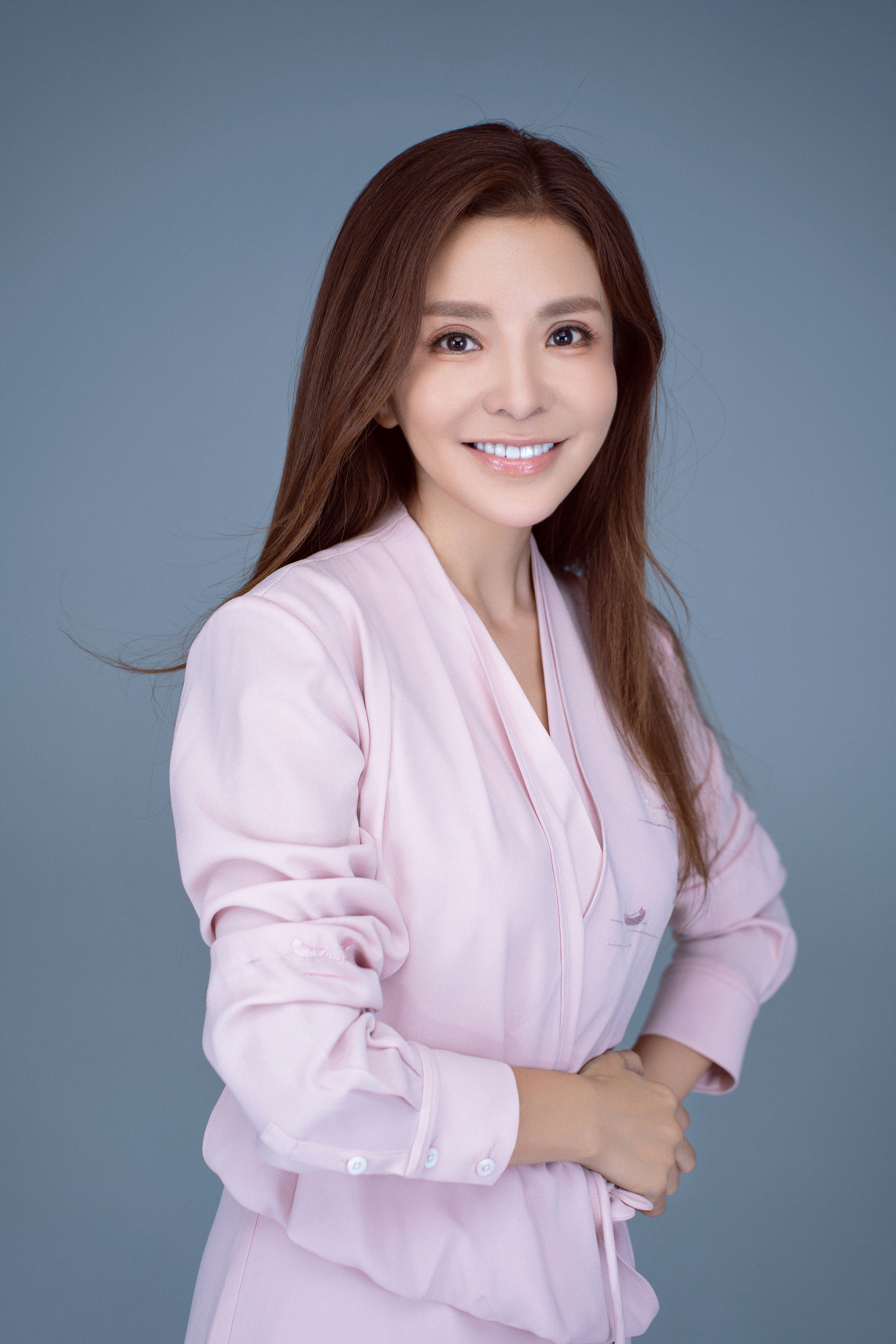
- Born: Beijing, China
- Education: Asia University
- Occupation: Host
- Years active: 1987–present
- Agent: China Central Television
- Spouse: Wang Zhi
- Children: 1

Zhu Xun (Chinese: 朱迅; pinyin: Zhū Xùn) is a Chinese television host of China Central Television (CCTV). Currently, she is responsible for hosting a number of most highest rated shows such as "Avenue of Stars", "Happiness Bill" and "My Art List", and most notably "CCTV New Year's Gala", all receiving over 1 billion viewers in ratings. Xun is a member of the 10th All-China Youth Federation, director of the China Television Artists Association, and director of the China Literary and Art Volunteers Association. In 2021, she was elected as a member of the 11th National Committee of the China Federation of Literary and Art Circles. In 2022, she was elected as the vice president of the Host Professional Committee of the China Television Artists Association; in 2023, she was elected as the charity ambassador of the China Disabled Persons Association.

== Biography ==
Born in Beijing, Zhu began her career as a television host in 1987, when she was a teenager. She was the host of the Our Generation program (我们这一代). In 1988 she appeared in the film Rocking Youth (摇滚青年). In 1990 she paused her television work to go to university at Asia University in Japan, studying management. Thereafter she remained in Japan and became a host with Japanese television station NHK. She then appeared in the television show Bounce Ko Gals, Three Giant Dragons, and Shanghainese in Tokyo. In 1998 she wrote her MBA thesis on "Media Market Strategy in the 21st Century". She later returned to China. She has hosted the CCTV New Year's Gala from 2009 to 2019.

She is married to Wang Zhi, another television presenter who works for CCTV.

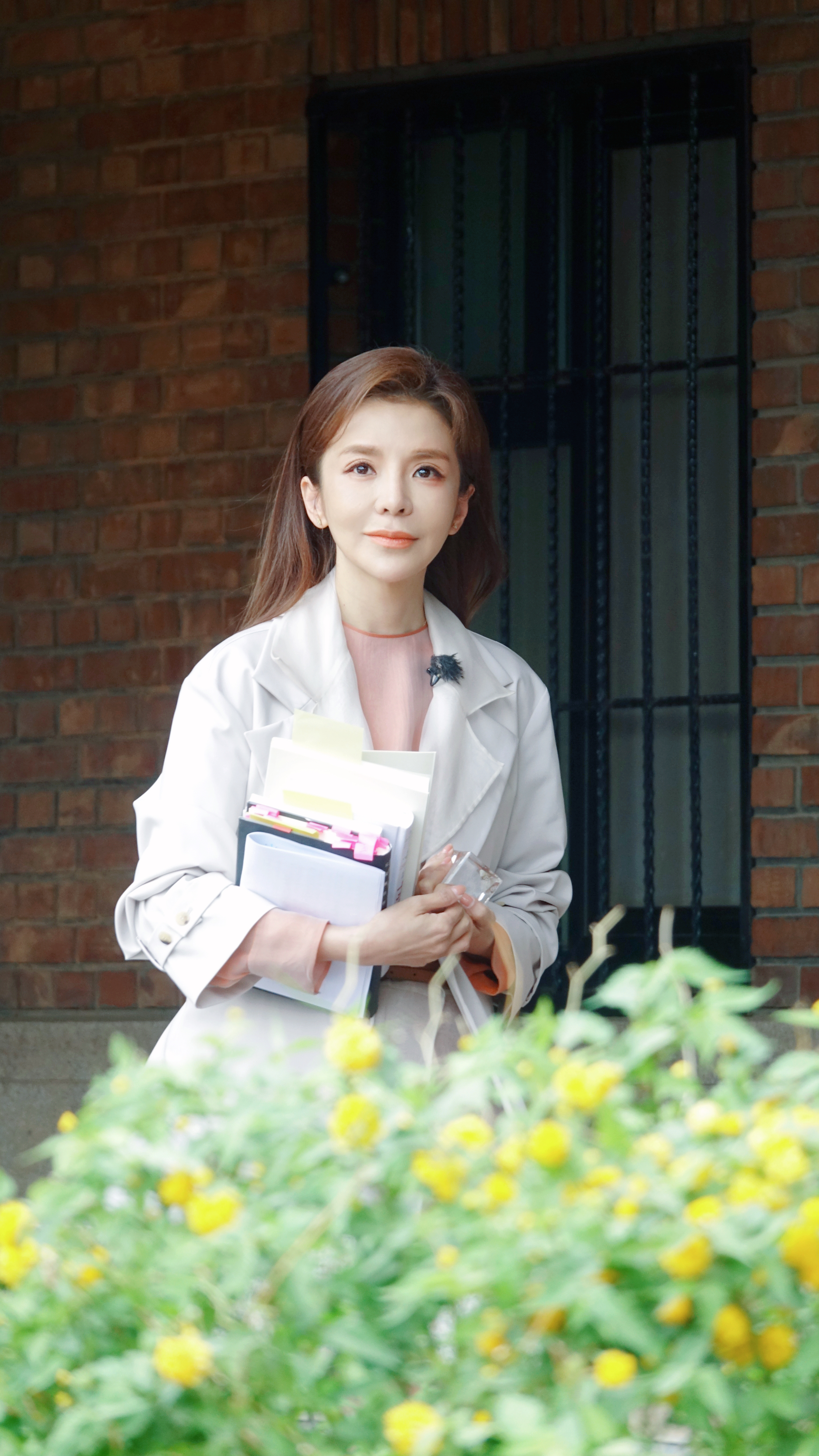
Zhu Xun

As with most non-locals, Zhu Xun once pronounced the name of Luhe District, Nanjing as Liuhe instead of Luhe.

== Awards ==
- Top Ten Hosts Selected by CCTV Network in 2007
- Won the Golden Microphone Award of China Radio and Television Association in 2009
- Won the "Wind from the East" Most Popular Award in 2009
- Won the top ten hosts of CCTV in 2008 and 2010
- Rated as an outstanding host of CCTV for many consecutive years in 2007, 2009, 2010, 2011 and 2012.
- In 2009, she was awarded the honorary title of “Women's Contributor Model of the State Administration of Radio, Film and Television 2009-2010”
- Won the honorary title of National March 8th Red Flag Bearer in 2011
- Awarded the title of Artist with both Virtue and Art in 2012
- Won the Golden Eagle Award for Best TV Host in 2014
- Named one of the top ten announcers and hosts of CCTV in 2017
- Won the title of "The Most Beautiful Volunteer" in the country's voluntary service modeled on Lei Feng in 2021
- Won the "Most Favorite Actress" at the 9th "Golden Begonia Award" Asian Micro Film Art Festival in 2022
