= Hengliang Subdistrict =

Hengliang Subdistrict 横梁街道
- Subdistrict
- Interactive map of Hengliang Subdistrict
- Coordinates: 32°19′33″N 118°56′05″E
- Country: People's Republic of China
- Province: Jiangsu
- Sub-provincial city: Nanjing
- District: Luhe
- Time zone: UTC+8 (China Standard)
- Postal code: 211515

Hengliang (simplified Chinese: 横梁; traditional Chinese: 橫梁; pinyin: Héngliáng; lit. 'beam') is a subdistrict of Luhe District, Nanjing, China. Located in the northeast of the city along the China National Highway 328, it borders on Yangzhou City. It is a town with more than 1000 years of history, cross-cultural atmosphere, rich in resources, and is the current and future focus on the development of Nanjing's "three-city, nine towns" being one of the nine towns.

The town is coloured by quartz sand, basalt, colored stones, and other rich materials, especially Yuhua agate stones are found. Lingyan Hill, Fangshan, Hengshan, milk Hill have high quality ground water. Existing permanent population of the town is 40,900 persons, migrants number more than 4,000. Most workers are educated to junior high school or above. It is rich in tourism resources such as Mingshan silk. Southeast of the town is Mount Fang, the world's best preserved ancient craters, with fairy holes, purple Chuk Yuen, Wang Zishi eight wonders, which attracts many tourists. Immediately to the east of Fangshan stands two prominent peaks called Milk Hill.

There is a high yield region of Nanjing river and Luhe river stones. Multiple villages, rely on processing, development and sales of river stones and its arts and crafts. They have embarked on international trade to become wealthy.
