= Jinniuhu station =

Nanjing Metro station

Jinniuhu 金牛湖
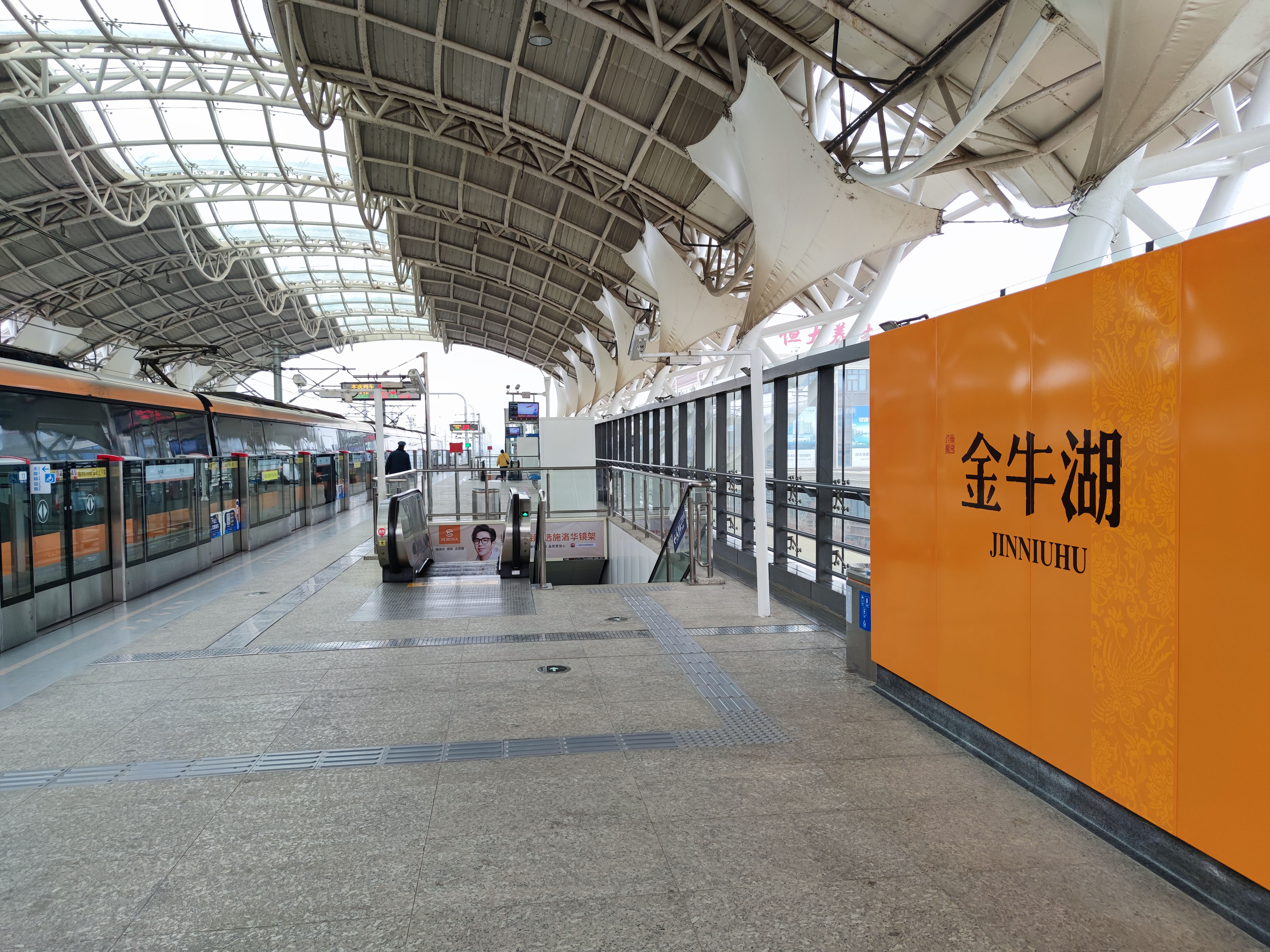

General information
- Location: Luhe District, Nanjing, Jiangsu; China
- Coordinates: 32.4675°N 118.9595°E
- Operated by: Nanjing Metro Co. Ltd.
- Line(s): Line S8

Construction
- Structure type: Elevated

History
- Opened: 1 August 2014

Services
Preceding station	Nanjing Metro	Following station
Babaiqiao towards Changjiangdaqiaobei	Line S8	Terminus
Location

Jinniuhu station (Chinese: 金牛湖站) is a metro station on Line S8 of the Nanjing Metro. It started operations on 1 August 2014.
