= Luhe, Nanjing =

Luhe 六合区 Liuho
- District
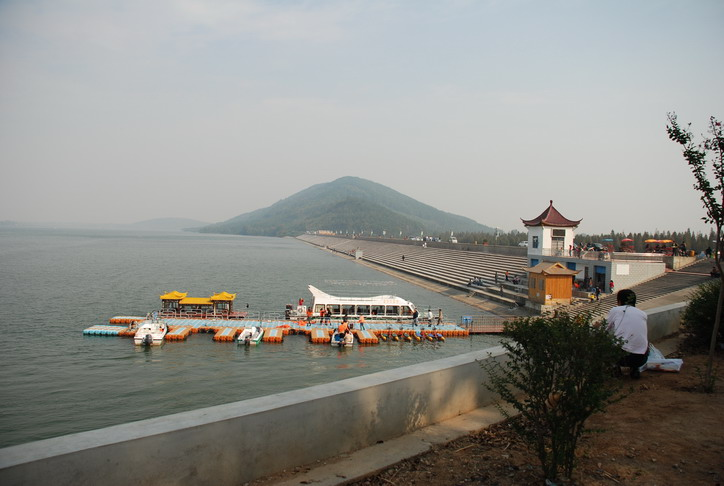

- Location in Jiangsu
- Coordinates: 32°19′24″N 118°49′20″E
- Country: People's Republic of China
- Province: Jiangsu
- Sub-provincial city: Nanjing

Area
  - Total: 1,484 km^{2} (573 sq mi)

Population (2020 census)
  - Total: 946,563
  - Density: 637.8/km^{2} (1,652/sq mi)
- Time zone: UTC+8 (China Standard)
- Postal code: 211500
- Area code: 025
Nanjing district map
Subdivisions of Nanjing, Jiangsu
City Proper
| 1 | Xuanwu |
| 2 | Qinhuai |
| 3 | Jianye |
| 4 | Gulou |
| 5 | Yuhuatai |
| 6 | Qixia |
Suburban
| 7 | Jiangning |
| 8 | Pukou |
| 9 | Luhe |
Rural
| 10 | Lishui |
| 11 | Gaochun |
- Website: njlh.gov.cn

Luhe District (simplified Chinese: 六合区; traditional Chinese: 六合區; pinyin: Lùhé Qū) (sometimes read as Liùhé Qū) is one of 11 districts of Nanjing, the capital of Jiangsu province, China.

As with most non-locals, famed broadcaster Zhu Xun once pronounced the name of Luhe District as Liuhe instead of Luhe.

== Administrative divisions ==
In the present, Luhe (Liuhe) District has 10 subdistricts and 10 towns.

10 subdistricts

- Shanpan (山潘街道)
- Xichangmen (西厂门街道)
- Xiejiadian (卸甲甸街道)
- Getang (葛塘街道)
- Changlu (长芦街道)
- Xiongzhou (雄州街道)
- Longchi (龙池街道)
- Chengqiao (程桥街道)
- Jinniuhu (金牛湖街道)
- Hengliang (横梁街道)

10 towns

- Yeshan (冶山镇)
- Guabu (瓜埠镇)
- Donggou (东沟镇)
- Zhuzhen (竹镇镇)
- Maji (马集镇)
- Longpao (龙袍镇)
- Yudai (玉带镇)
- Ma'an (马鞍镇)
- Xinhuang (新篁镇)
- Babaiqiao (八百桥镇)

== Climate ==
Climate data for Luhe, elevation 10 m (33 ft), (1991–2020 normals, extremes 1981–2010)
| Month | Jan | Feb | Mar | Apr | May | Jun | Jul | Aug | Sep | Oct | Nov | Dec | Year |
|---|---|---|---|---|---|---|---|---|---|---|---|---|---|
| Record high °C (°F) | 20.7 (69.3) | 27.5 (81.5) | 29.3 (84.7) | 33.6 (92.5) | 36.0 (96.8) | 37.5 (99.5) | 38.9 (102.0) | 39.4 (102.9) | 38.0 (100.4) | 33.4 (92.1) | 28.1 (82.6) | 22.9 (73.2) | 39.4 (102.9) |
| Mean daily maximum °C (°F) | 7.0 (44.6) | 9.8 (49.6) | 14.9 (58.8) | 21.3 (70.3) | 26.5 (79.7) | 29.3 (84.7) | 32.2 (90.0) | 31.5 (88.7) | 27.7 (81.9) | 22.7 (72.9) | 16.3 (61.3) | 9.6 (49.3) | 20.7 (69.3) |
| Daily mean °C (°F) | 2.5 (36.5) | 5.0 (41.0) | 9.7 (49.5) | 15.8 (60.4) | 21.3 (70.3) | 24.9 (76.8) | 28.2 (82.8) | 27.5 (81.5) | 23.1 (73.6) | 17.4 (63.3) | 10.9 (51.6) | 4.7 (40.5) | 15.9 (60.7) |
| Mean daily minimum °C (°F) | −0.9 (30.4) | 1.3 (34.3) | 5.3 (41.5) | 10.8 (51.4) | 16.5 (61.7) | 21.2 (70.2) | 24.9 (76.8) | 24.4 (75.9) | 19.6 (67.3) | 13.3 (55.9) | 6.8 (44.2) | 1.0 (33.8) | 12.0 (53.6) |
| Record low °C (°F) | −13.7 (7.3) | −11.3 (11.7) | −5.5 (22.1) | −0.8 (30.6) | 6.1 (43.0) | 12.6 (54.7) | 18.3 (64.9) | 16.4 (61.5) | 10.4 (50.7) | 1.7 (35.1) | −5.6 (21.9) | −14.0 (6.8) | −14.0 (6.8) |
| Average precipitation mm (inches) | 46.5 (1.83) | 46.1 (1.81) | 74.7 (2.94) | 67.3 (2.65) | 85.4 (3.36) | 169.1 (6.66) | 210.2 (8.28) | 158.5 (6.24) | 81.0 (3.19) | 54.1 (2.13) | 50.3 (1.98) | 33.0 (1.30) | 1,076.2 (42.37) |
| Average precipitation days (≥ 0.1 mm) | 8.7 | 8.7 | 10.1 | 9.6 | 9.8 | 10.7 | 12.7 | 12.4 | 8.2 | 7.6 | 7.9 | 6.8 | 113.2 |
| Average snowy days | 3.7 | 2.8 | 1.0 | 0 | 0 | 0 | 0 | 0 | 0 | 0 | 0.4 | 1.3 | 9.2 |
| Average relative humidity (%) | 74 | 75 | 69 | 69 | 70 | 75 | 80 | 81 | 81 | 76 | 76 | 73 | 75 |
| Mean monthly sunshine hours | 123.1 | 126.1 | 153.6 | 182.6 | 191.3 | 157.6 | 189.0 | 195.6 | 167.9 | 169.2 | 143.6 | 134.7 | 1,934.3 |
| Percentage possible sunshine | 38 | 40 | 41 | 47 | 45 | 37 | 44 | 48 | 46 | 48 | 46 | 43 | 44 |
Source: China Meteorological Administration
