= Jiaxi station =

Metro station in Nanjing, China

Jiaxi 贾西
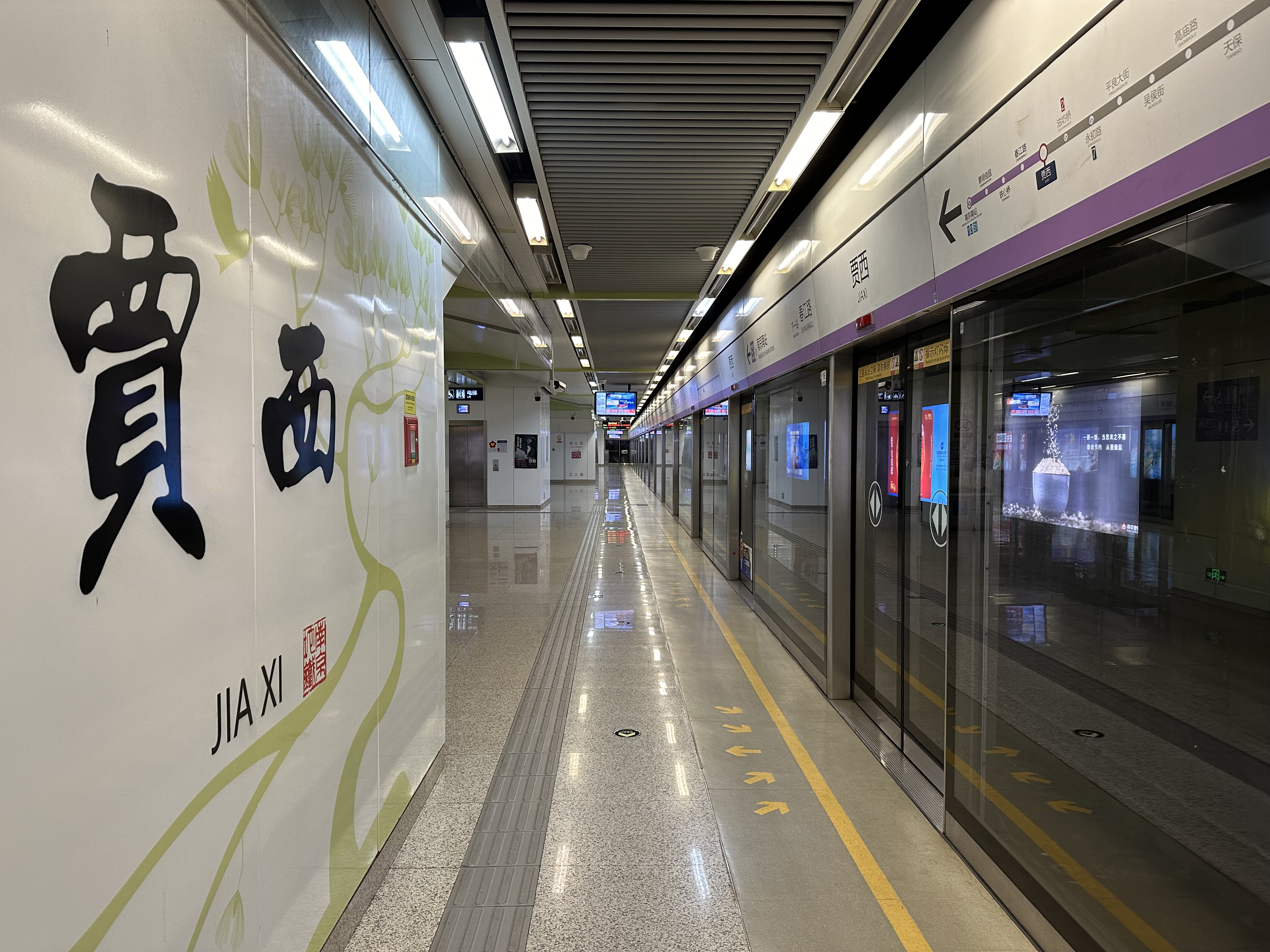

General information
- Location: Yuhuatai District, Nanjing, Jiangsu; China
- Operated by: Nanjing Metro Co. Ltd.
- Line: Line S3

Construction
- Structure type: Elevated

History
- Opened: 6 December 2017; 8 years ago

Services
Preceding station	Nanjing Metro	Following station
Chunjianglu towards Nanjing South Railway Station	Line S3	Youfangqiao towards Gaojiachong
Location

Jiaxi station (Chinese: 贾西站) is a metro station on Line S3 of the Nanjing Metro. It began operations on 6 December 2017.
