= Yongchulu station =

Metro station in Nanjing, China

Yongchulu 永初路
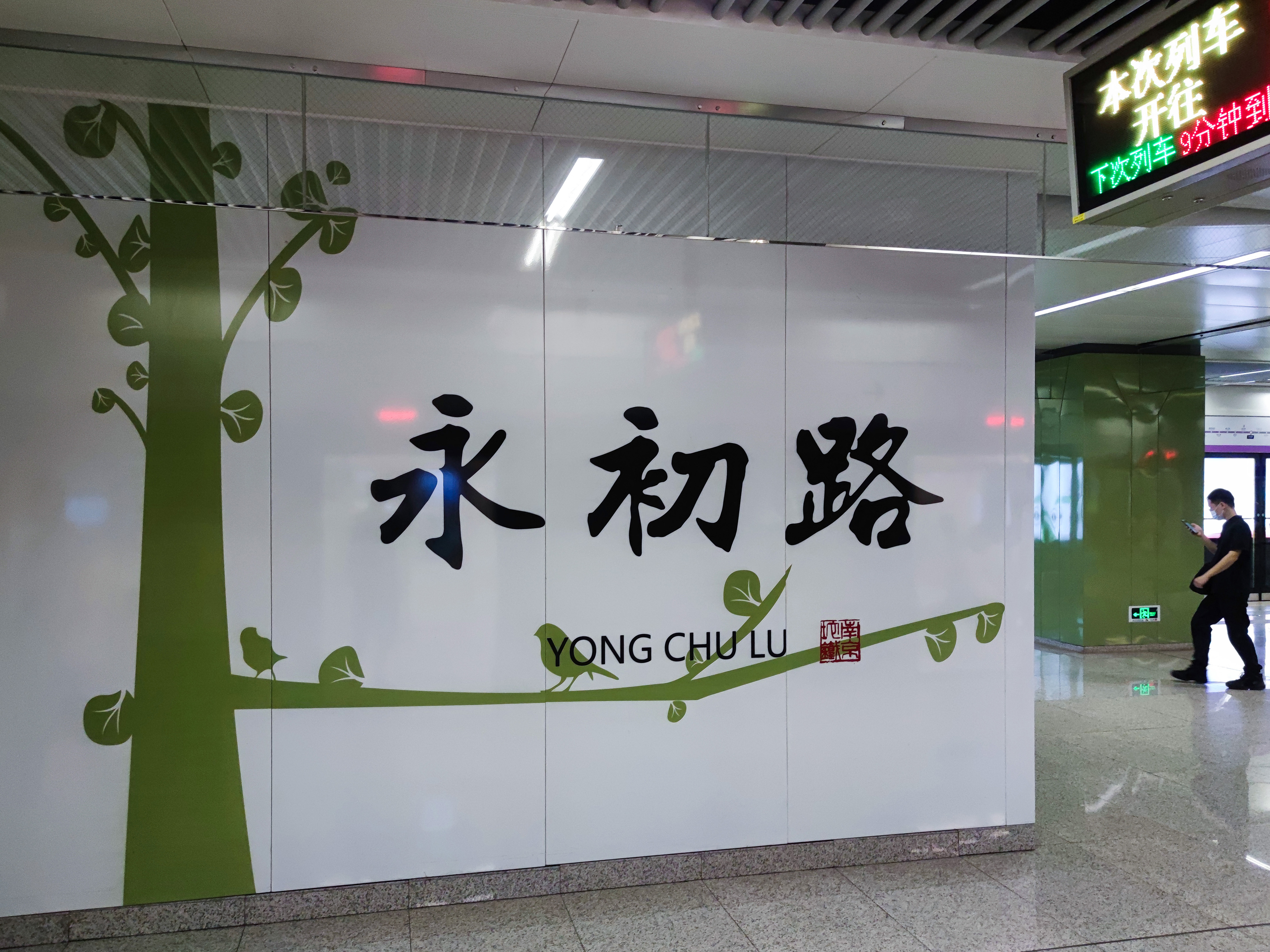

General information
- Location: Jianye District, Nanjing, Jiangsu; China
- Operated by: Nanjing Metro Co. Ltd.
- Lines: Line 7 Line S3

Construction
- Structure type: Underground

History
- Opened: 6 December 2017; 8 years ago

Services
Preceding station	Nanjing Metro	Following station
Jialingjiangdongjie towards Xianxinlu	Line 7	Taiqinglu towards Xishanqiao
Youfangqiao towards Nanjing South Railway Station	Line S3	Pingliangdajie towards Gaojiachong
Location

Yongchulu station (Chinese: 永初路站; lit. 'Yongchu road station') is a station of Line S3 of the Nanjing Metro. It started operations on 6 December 2017. On 28 December 2023, with the opening of the southern part of Line 7, it became an interchange station between Line 7 and Line S3. The station name is derived from the era name "Yongchu" of Emperor Wu of the Song Dynasty.
