= Shuanglong station (Nanjing Metro) =

Metro station in Nanjing, China

Shuanglong 双垅
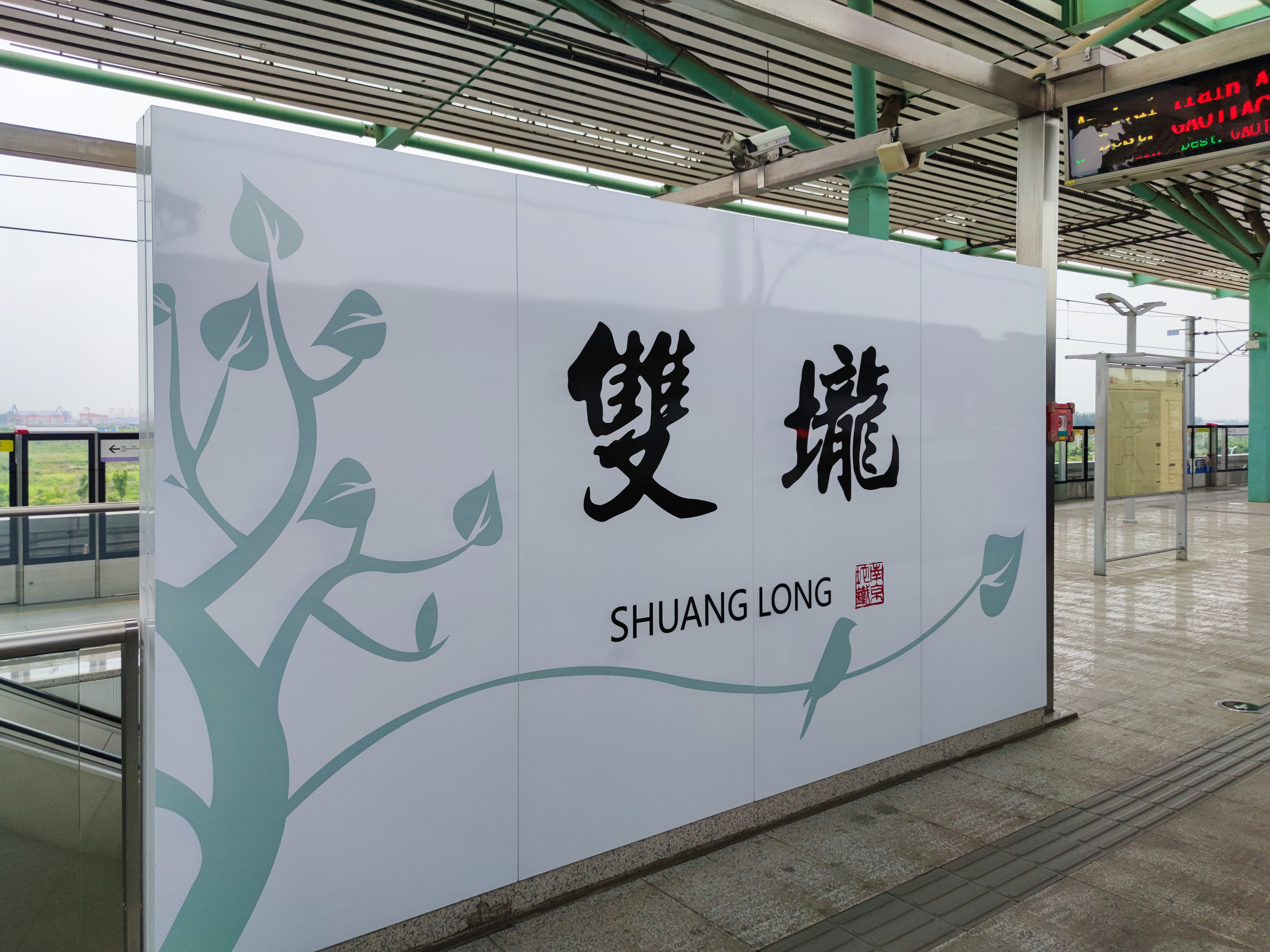

General information
- Location: Pukou District, Nanjing, Jiangsu; China
- Operated by: Nanjing Metro Co. Ltd.
- Line: Line S3

History
- Opened: 6 December 2017; 8 years ago

Services
Preceding station	Nanjing Metro	Following station
Lanhuatang towards Nanjing South Railway Station	Line S3	Shiqihe towards Gaojiachong
Location

Shuanglong station (Chinese: 双垅站) is a station of Line S3 of the Nanjing Metro, China. It started operations on 6 December 2017.
