= Shiqihe station =

Metro station in Nanjing, China

Shiqihe 石碛河
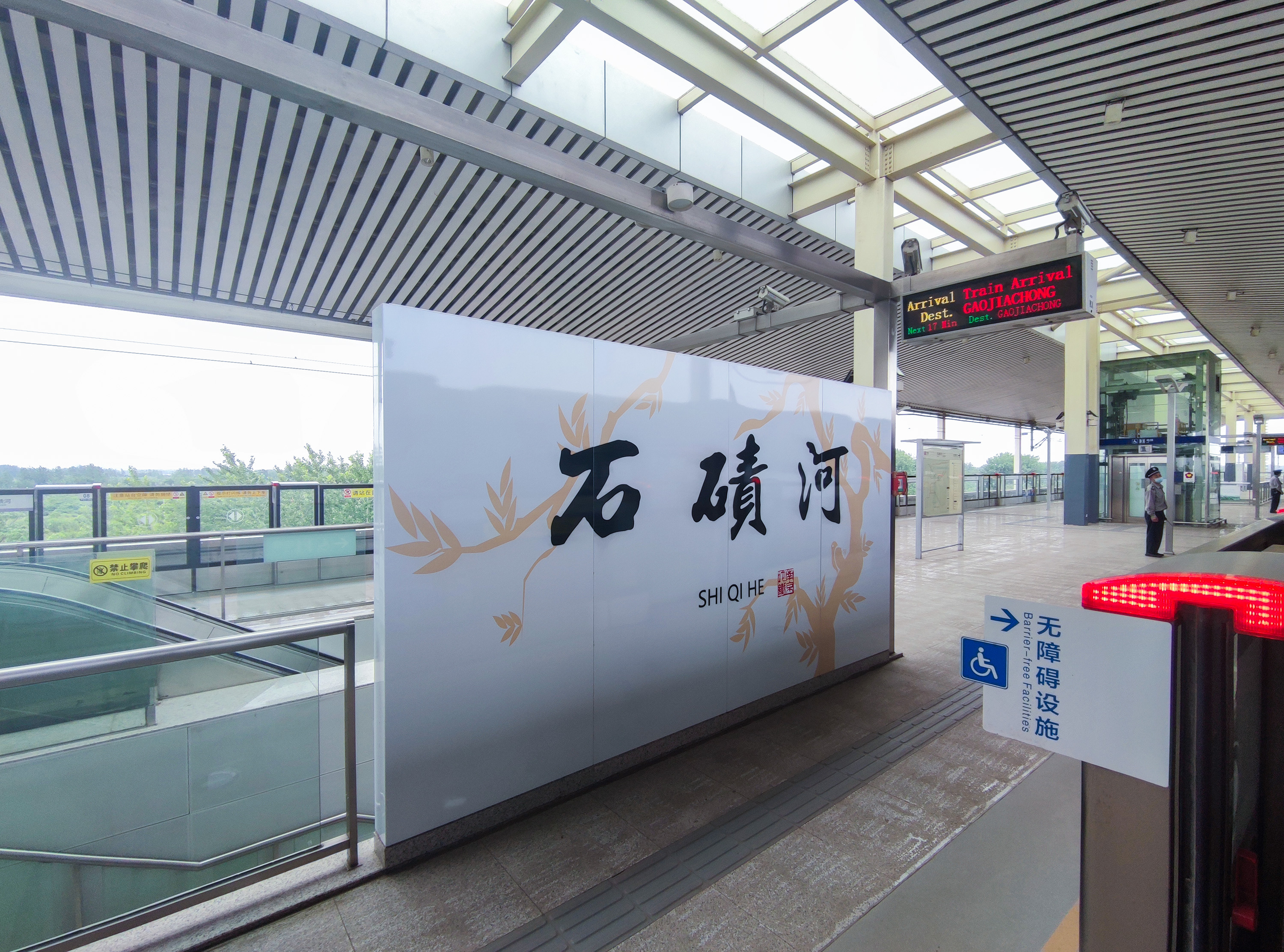

General information
- Location: Pukou District, Nanjing, Jiangsu; China
- Operated by: Nanjing Metro Co. Ltd.
- Line: Line S3

Construction
- Structure type: Elevated

History
- Opened: 6 December 2017; 8 years ago

Services
Preceding station	Nanjing Metro	Following station
Shuanglong towards Nanjing South Railway Station	Line S3	Qiaolinxincheng towards Gaojiachong
Location

Shiqihe station (Chinese: 石碛河站) is a station of Line S3 of the Nanjing Metro. It started operations on 6 December 2017.

Shiqihe has been called the system's "most desolate" station: As of October 2019, it was located two kilometers from the nearest settled area and was not connected to any paved roads. Only a few dozen people use the station daily.
