= Qiaolinxincheng station =

Metro station in Nanjing, China

Qiaolinxincheng 桥林新城
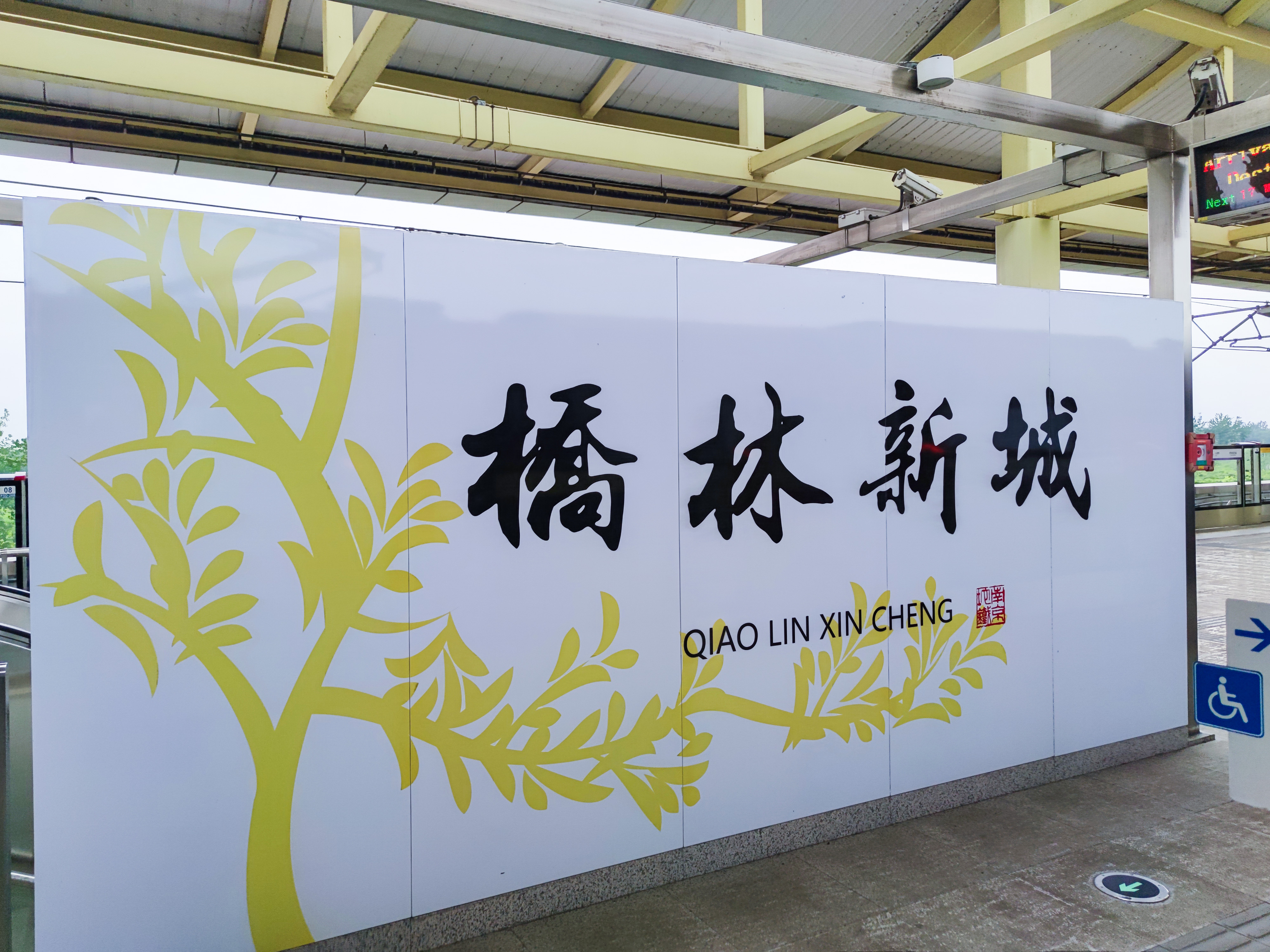

General information
- Location: Pukou District, Nanjing, Jiangsu; China
- Coordinates: 31.93198°N 118.54228°E
- Operator: Nanjing Metro Co. Ltd.
- Line: Line S3

History
- Opened: 6 December 2017; 8 years ago

Services
Preceding station	Nanjing Metro	Following station
Shiqihe towards Nanjing South Railway Station	Line S3	Linshan towards Gaojiachong
Location
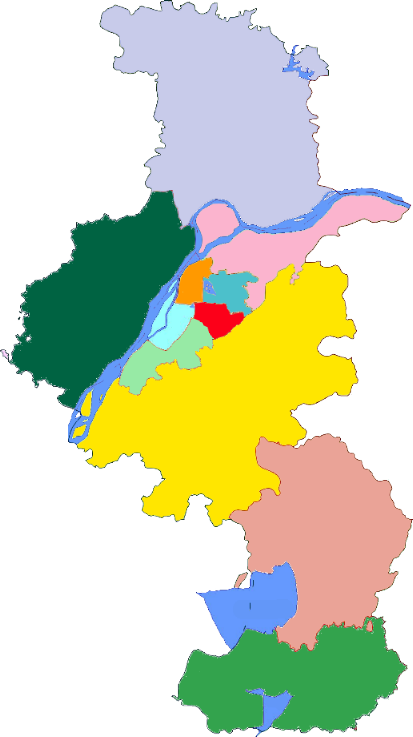
- Location within Nanjing

Qiaolinxincheng station (Chinese: 桥林新城站), is a station of Line S3 of the Nanjing Metro. It started operations on 6 December 2017.
