= Wuhoujie station =

Metro station in Nanjing, China

Wuhoujie 吴侯街
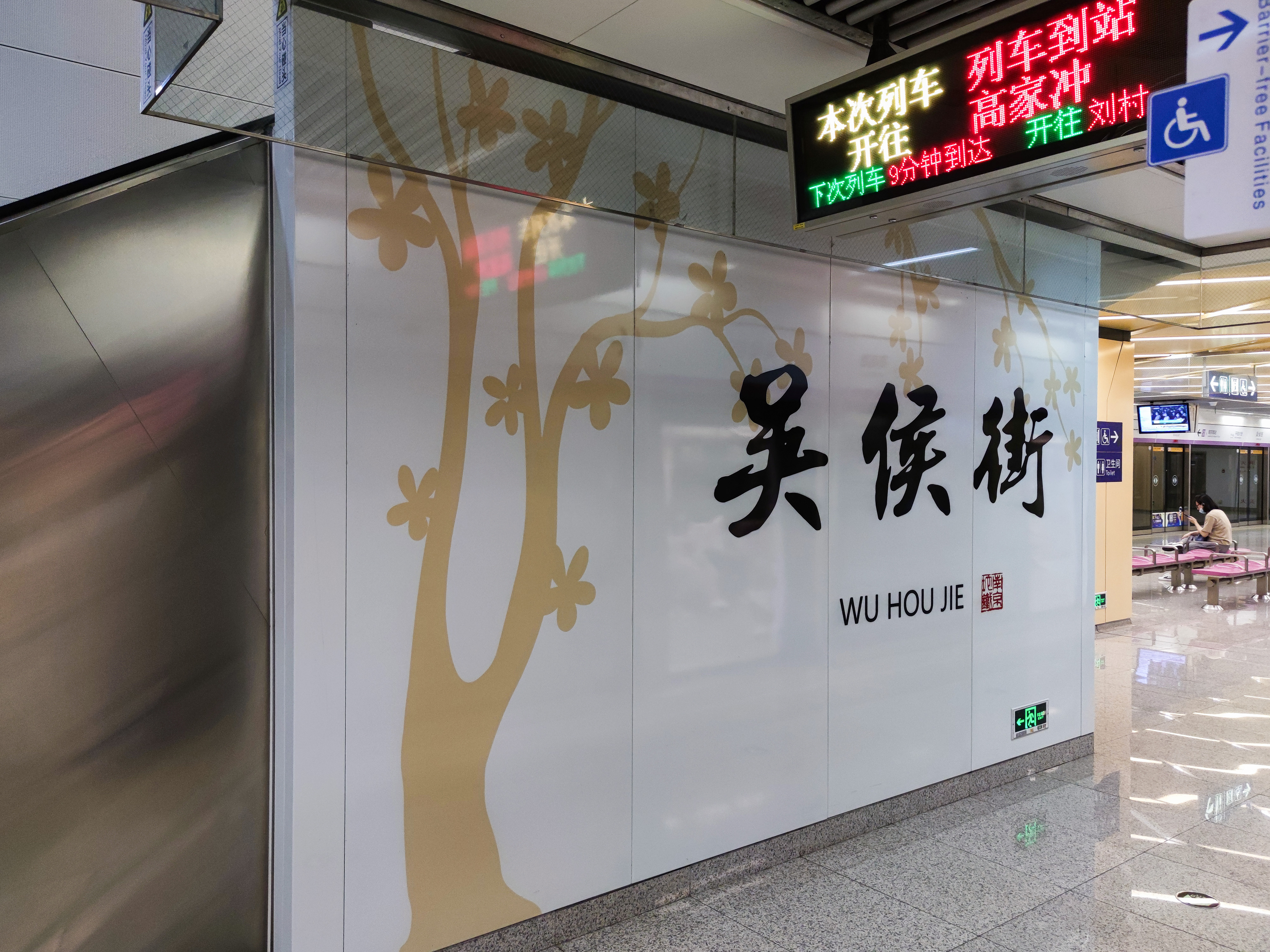

General information
- Location: Jianye District, Nanjing, Jiangsu; China
- Operated by: Nanjing Metro Co. Ltd.
- Line: Line S3

History
- Opened: 6 December 2017; 8 years ago

Services
Preceding station	Nanjing Metro	Following station
Pingliangdajie towards Nanjing South Railway Station	Line S3	Gaomiaolu towards Gaojiachong
Location

Wuhoujie station (Chinese: 吴侯街站) is a station of Line S3 of the Nanjing Metro. It started operations on 6 December 2017.
