= Lanhuatang station =

Metro station in Nanjing, China

Lanhuatang 兰花塘
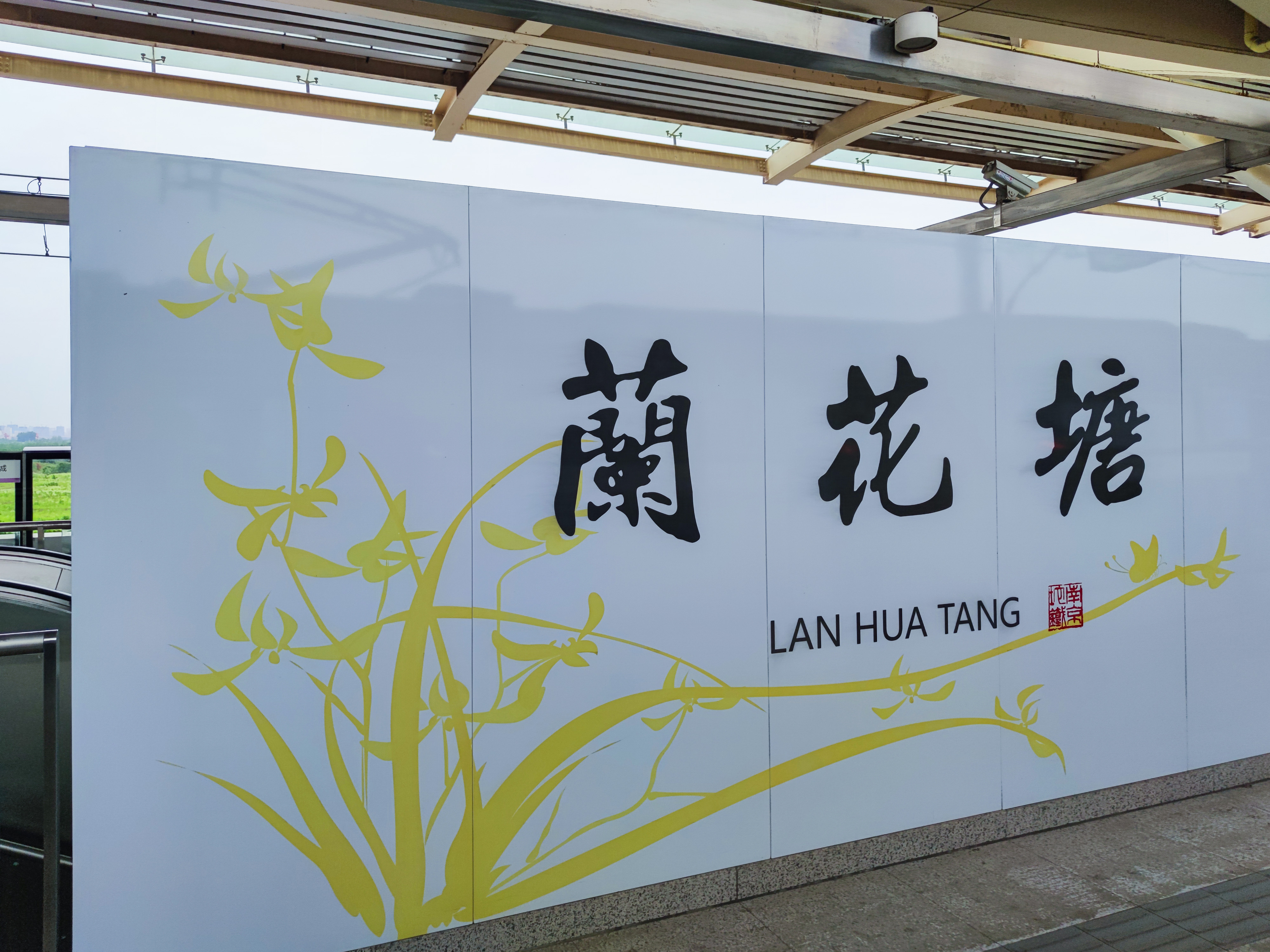

General information
- Location: Pukou District, Nanjing, Jiangsu; China
- Coordinates: 31.9604°N 118.5698°E
- Operated by: Nanjing Metro Co. Ltd.
- Line: Line S3

History
- Opened: 6 December 2017; 8 years ago

Services
Preceding station	Nanjing Metro	Following station
Maluowei towards Nanjing South Railway Station	Line S3	Shuanglong towards Gaojiachong
Location

Lanhuatang station (Chinese: 兰花塘站) is a station of Line S3 of the Nanjing Metro. It started operations on 6 December 2017.
