= Tianbao station (Nanjing Metro) =

Metro station in Nanjing, China

Tianbao 天保
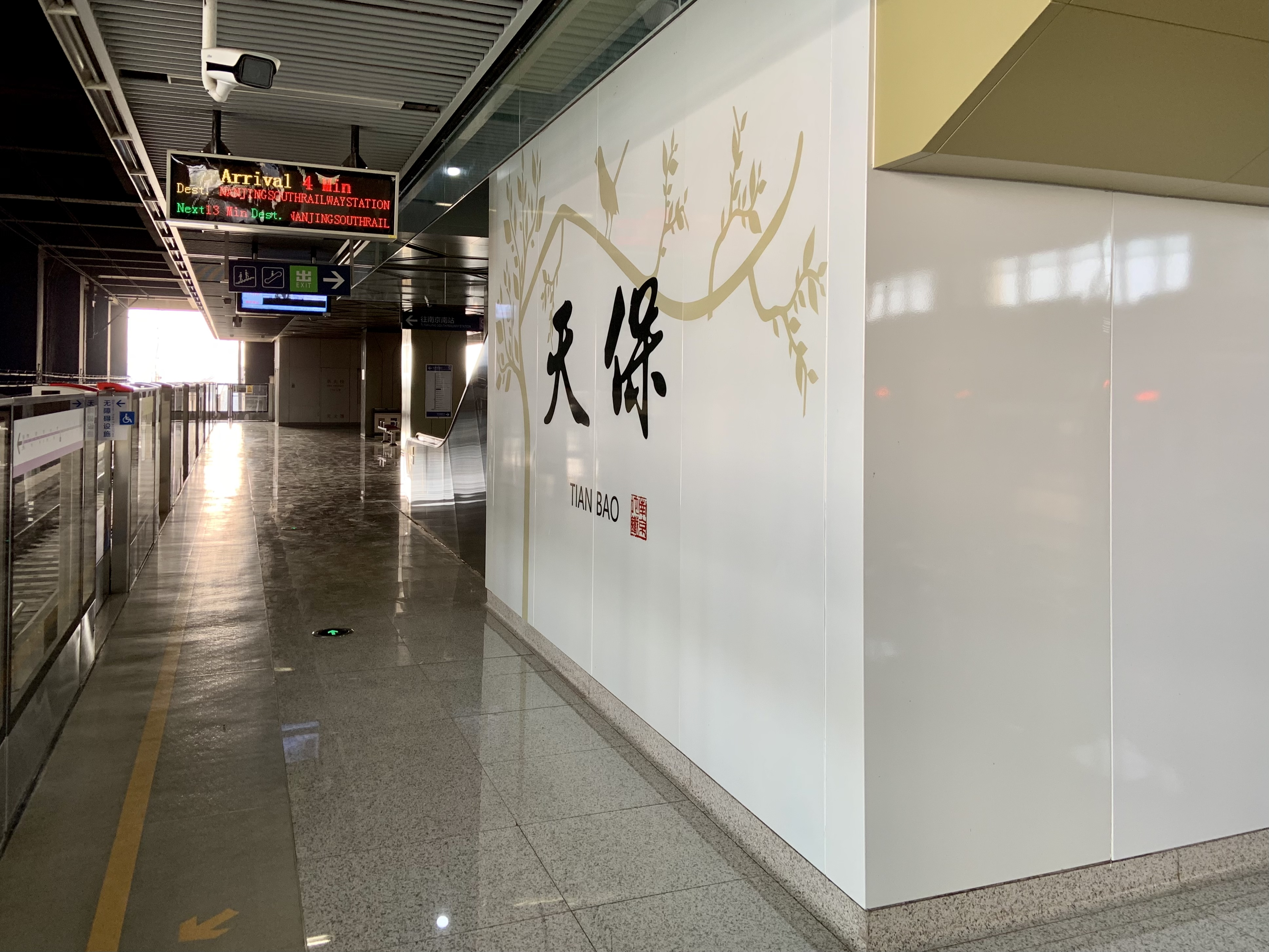

General information
- Location: Yuhuatai District, Nanjing, Jiangsu; China
- Coordinates: 31.9553°N 118.6724°E
- Operated by: Nanjing Metro Co. Ltd.
- Line: Line S3

History
- Opened: 6 December 2017; 8 years ago

Services
| Preceding station | Nanjing Metro | Following station |
|---|---|---|
| Gaomiaolu towards Nanjing South Railway Station | Line S3 | Liucun towards Gaojiachong |
Location

Tianbao station (Chinese: 天保站) is a station of Line S3 of the Nanjing Metro. It started operations on 6 December 2017.
