= Chunjianglu station =

Metro station in Nanjing, China

Chunjianglu 春江路
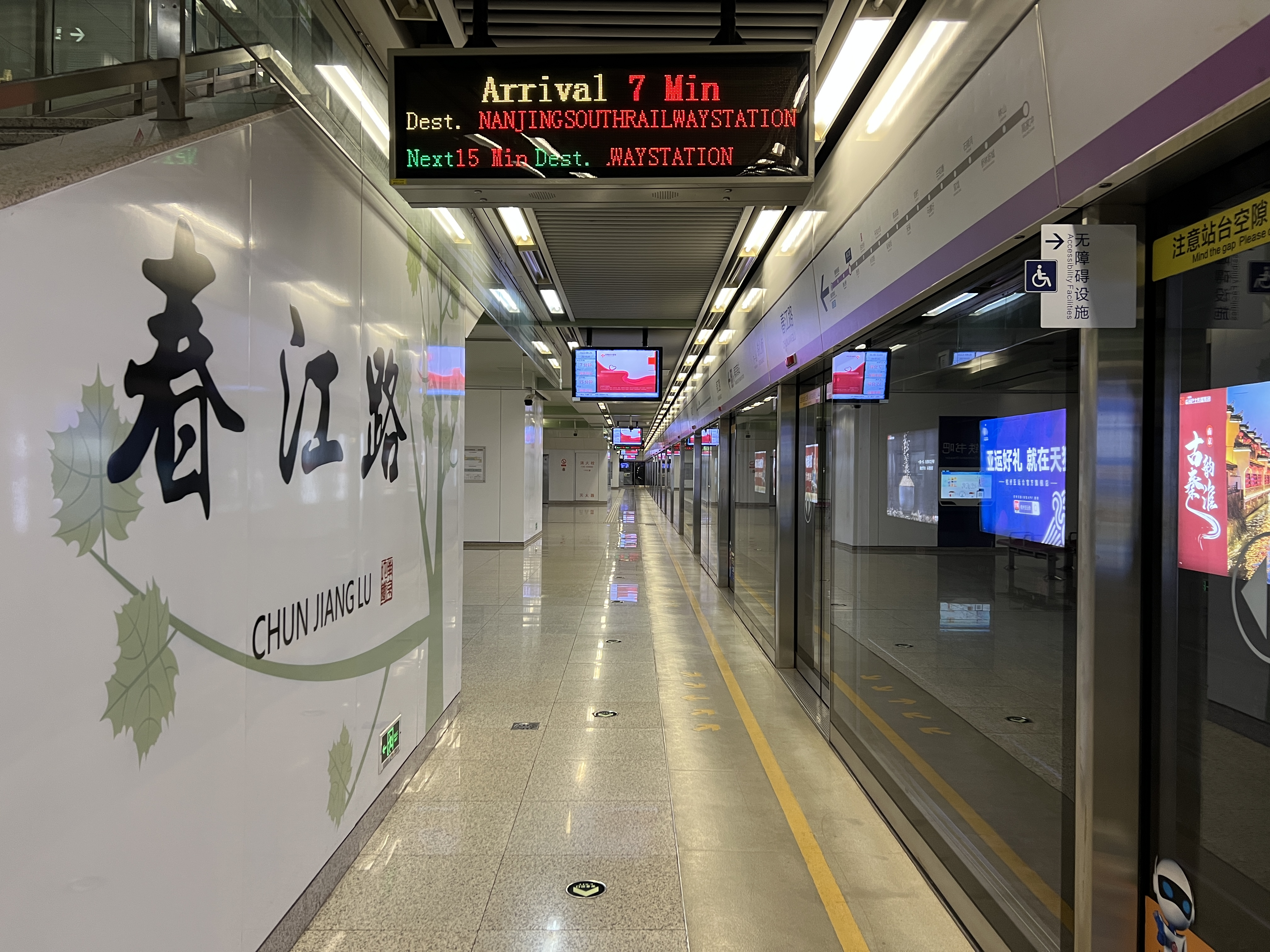

General information
- Location: Yuhuatai District, Nanjing, Jiangsu; China
- Coordinates: 31.96452°N 118.7448°E
- Operated by: Nanjing Metro Co. Ltd.
- Line(s): Line S3

History
- Opened: 6 December 2017; 7 years ago

Services
Preceding station	Nanjing Metro	Following station
Tiexinqiao towards Nanjing South Railway Station	Line S3	Jiaxi towards Gaojiachong
Location

Chunjianglu station (Chinese: 春江路站) is a station of Line S3 of the Nanjing Metro. It started operations on 6 December 2017.
