= Youfangqiao station =

Nanjing Metro interchange station

Coordinates: 31.9666°N 118.7210°E

Youfangqiao 油坊桥
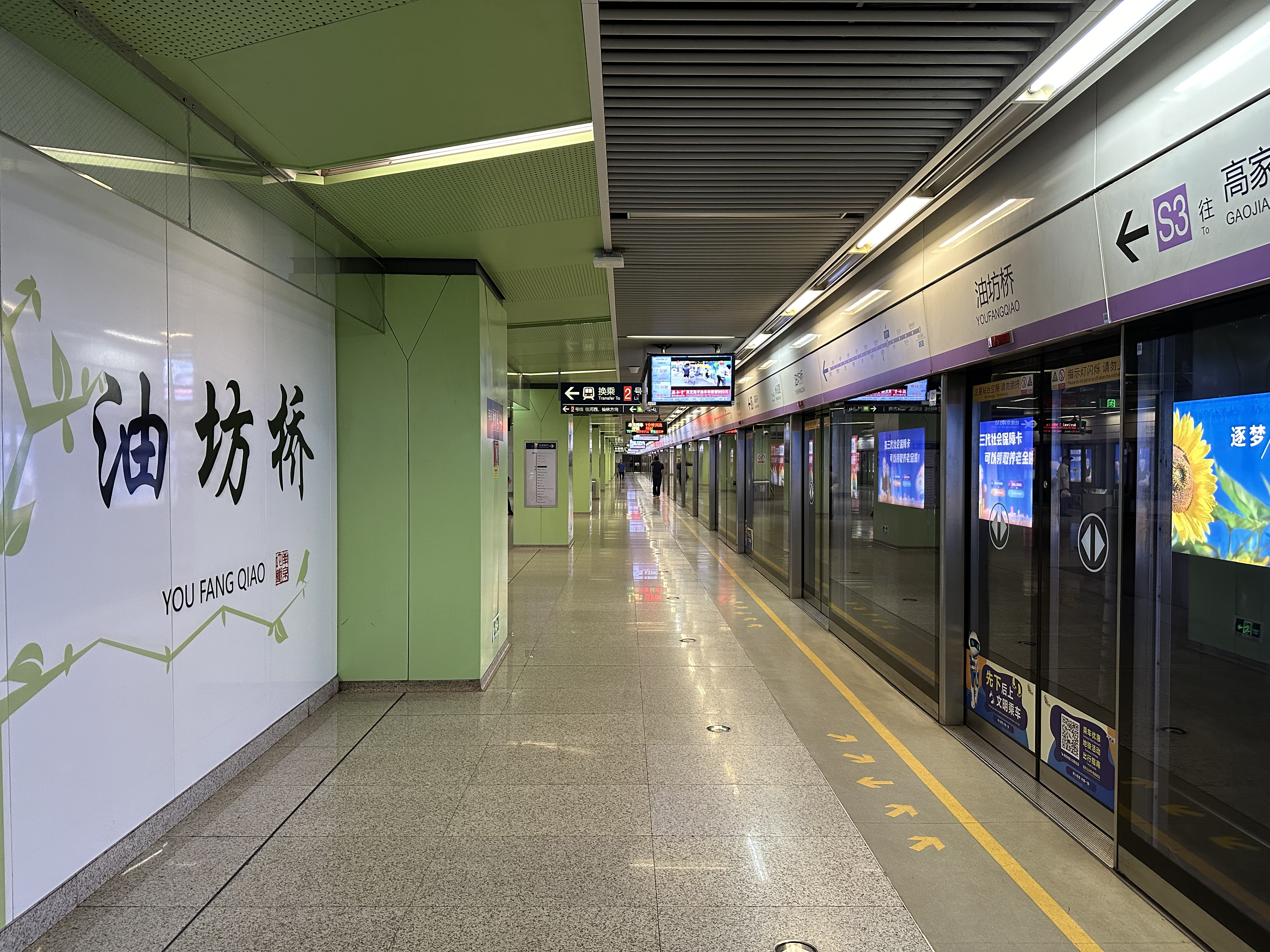
- Platform of Line S3

General information
- Location: Xishanqiao Subdistrict, Jianye District, Nanjing, Jiangsu; China
- Operated by: Nanjing Metro Co. Ltd.
- Lines: Line 2 Line S3

Construction
- Structure type: At-grade

Other information
- Station code: 205

History
- Opened: 28 May 2010; 16 years ago (Line 2); 26 December 2017; 8 years ago (Line S3)

Services
Preceding station	Nanjing Metro	Following station
Luotanglu towards Yuzui	Line 2	Yurundajie towards Jingtianlu
Jiaxi towards Nanjing South Railway Station	Line S3	Yongchulu towards Gaojiachong
Location

Youfangqiao station (simplified Chinese: 油坊桥站; traditional Chinese: 油坊橋站; pinyin: Yóufāngqiáo zhàn), known as Wangjiacun station (汪家村站; Wāngjiācūn zhàn) during planning until 2007, is a station on Line 2 and Line S3 of the Nanjing Metro. It started operations on 28 May 2010 along with the rest of Line 2. The interchange with Line S3 opened on 26 December 2017 with the opening of that line.
