= Tiexinqiao station =

Railway station in Jiangsu, China

Coordinates: 31.9665°N 118.7590°E

Tiexinqiao 铁心桥
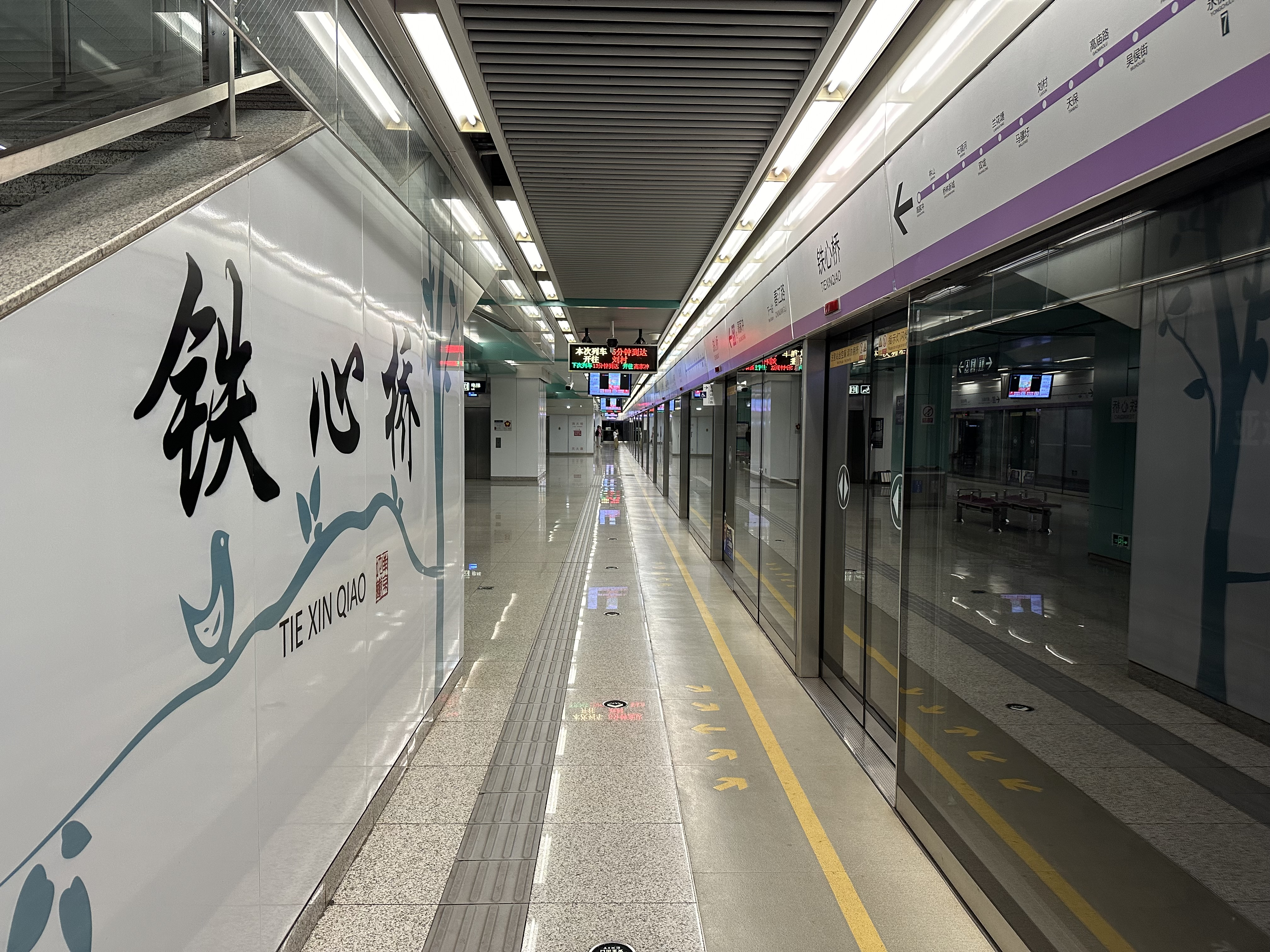

General information
- Location: Yuhuatai District, Nanjing, Jiangsu; China
- Operated by: Nanjing Metro Co. Ltd.
- Line: Line S3

History
- Opened: 6 December 2017; 8 years ago

Services
Preceding station	Nanjing Metro	Following station
Jingmingjiayuan towards Nanjing South Railway Station	Line S3	Chunjianglu towards Gaojiachong
Location

Tiexinqiao station (Chinese: 铁心桥站) is a station of Line S3 of the Nanjing Metro. It started operations on 6 December 2017.
