= Liucun station =

Station of Line S3 of the Nanjing Metro

Liucun 刘村
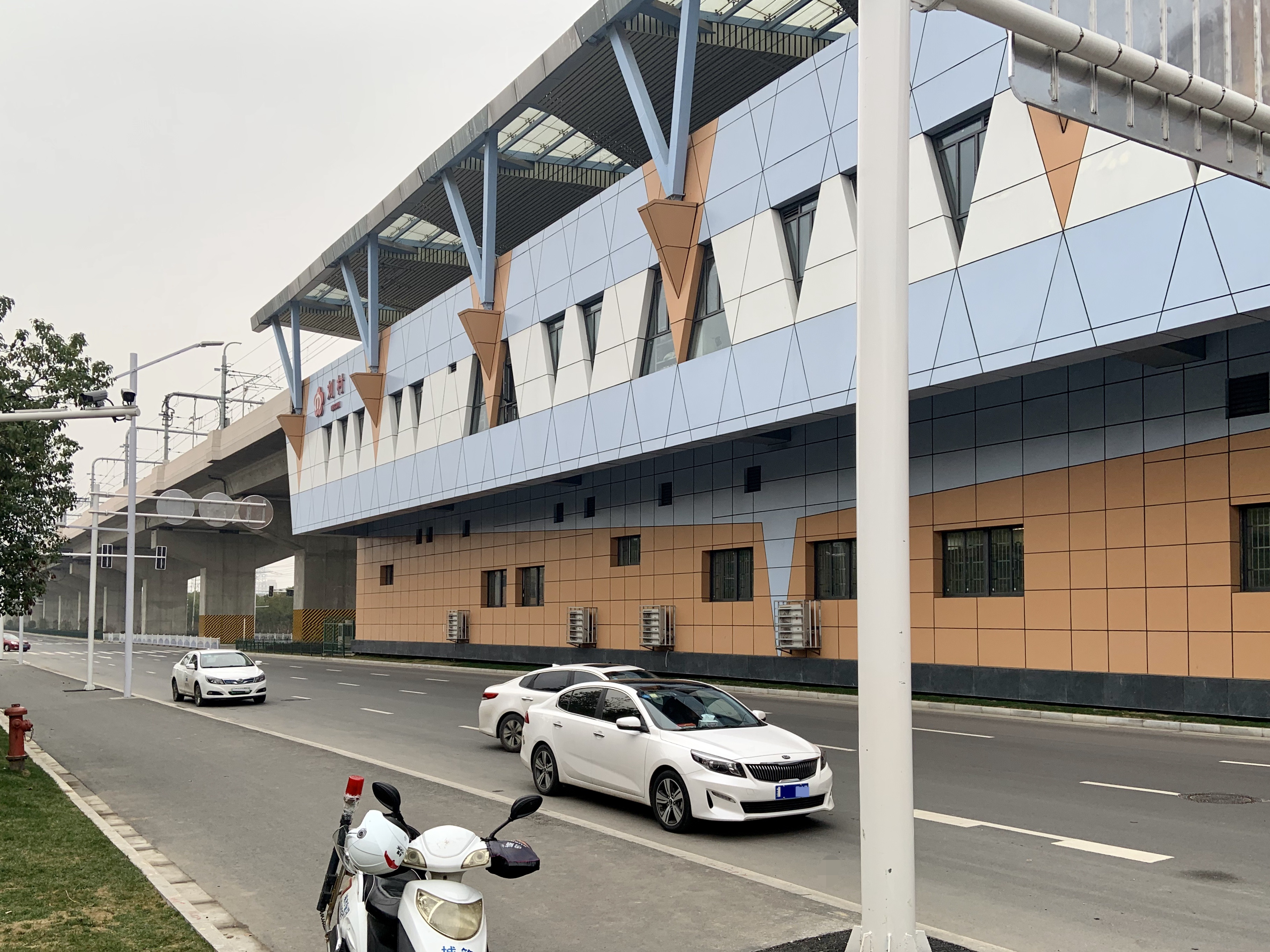

General information
- Location: Yuhuatai District, Nanjing, Jiangsu; China
- Operated by: Nanjing Metro Co. Ltd.
- Line: Line S3

History
- Opened: 6 December 2017; 8 years ago

Services
Preceding station	Nanjing Metro	Following station
Tianbao towards Nanjing South Railway Station	Line S3	Maluowei towards Gaojiachong
Location

Liucun station (Chinese: 刘村站) is a station of Line S3 of the Nanjing Metro. It started operations on 6 December 2017.
