= Jingmingjiayuan station =

Metro station in Nanjing, China

Jingmingjiayuan 景明佳园
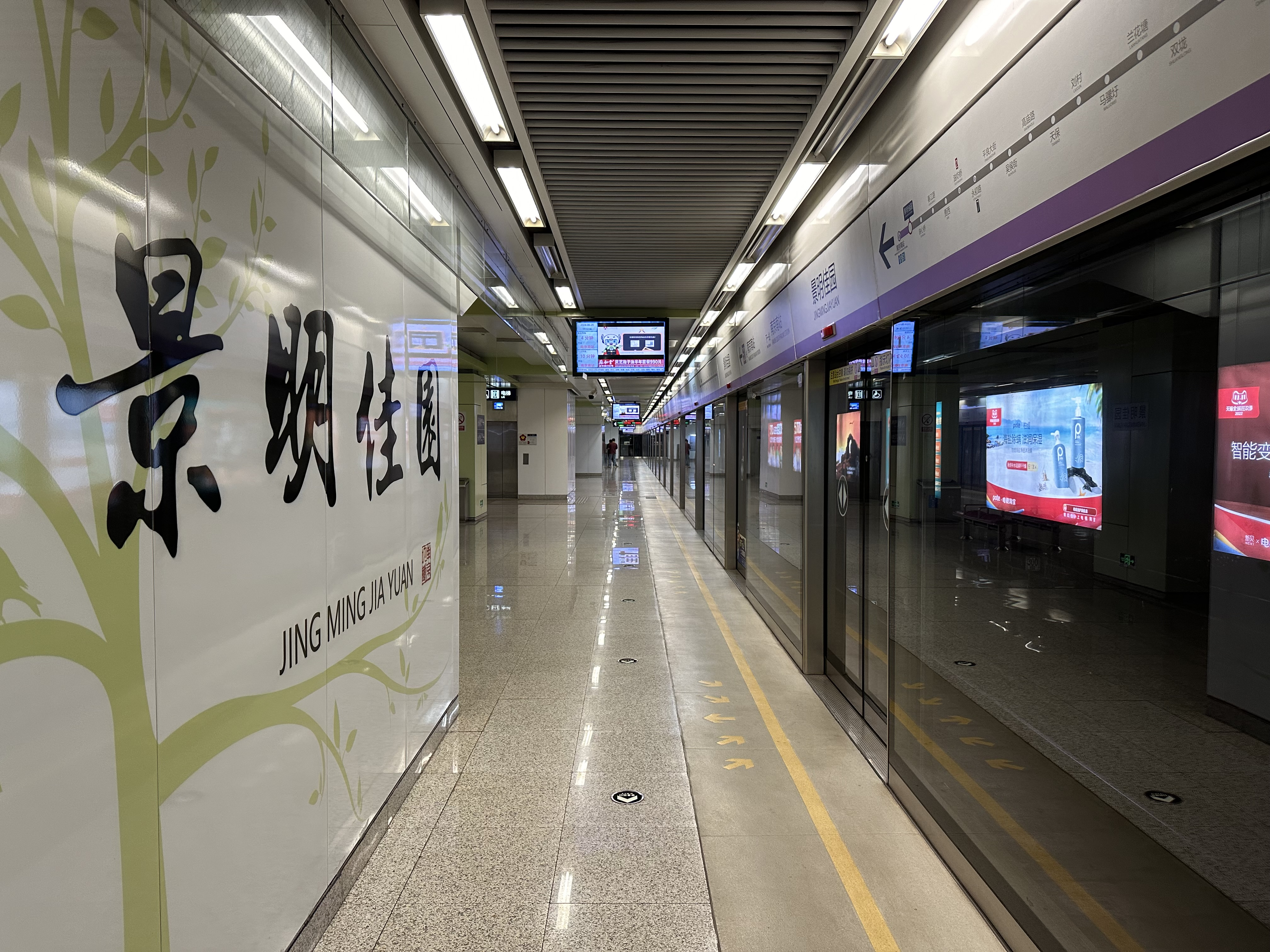

General information
- Location: Yuhuatai District, Nanjing, Jiangsu; China
- Operated by: Nanjing Metro Co. Ltd.
- Line: Line S3

History
- Opened: 6 December 2017; 8 years ago

Services
Preceding station	Nanjing Metro	Following station
Nanjing South Railway Station Terminus	Line S3	Tiexinqiao towards Gaojiachong
Location

Jingmingjiayuan station (Chinese: 景明佳园站) is a station of Line S3 of the Nanjing Metro. It started operations on 6 December 2017.
