= Line S3 (Nanjing Metro) =

Metro line in Nanjing, China

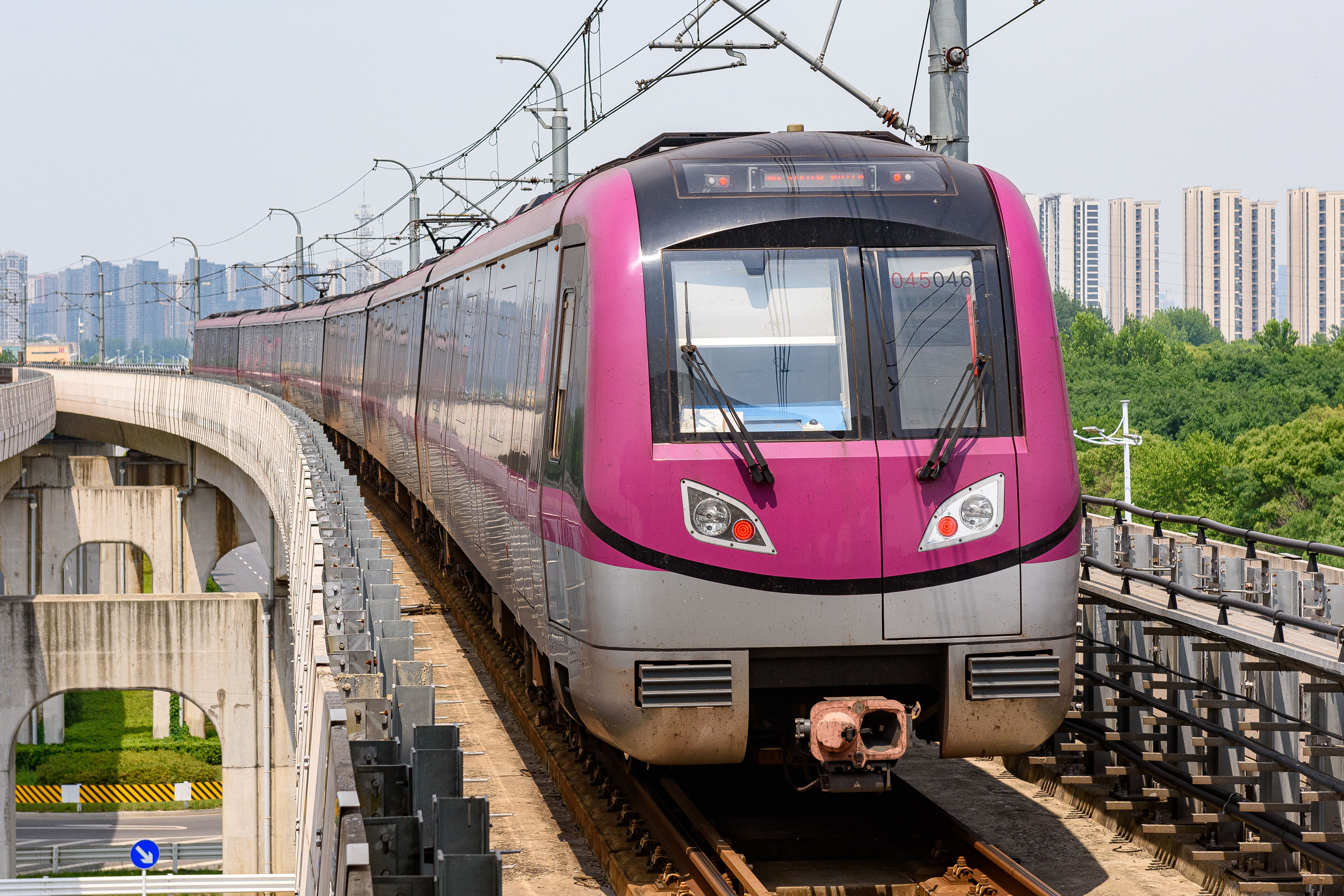
- Line S3 train leaving Liucun station

Overview
- Other names: Nanjing–He County intercity railway; Ninghe intercity railway (Note: "Ning" (宁), is the standard Chinese abbreviation for Nanjing. It comes from the name "Jiangning" (江宁) that the city had in the early Qing.); Ninghe Line
- Status: In operation
- Locale: Yuhuatai, Jianye and Pukou districts Nanjing, Jiangsu
- Termini: Nanjing South Railway Station; Gaojiachong
- Stations: 19

Service
- Type: Rapid transit
- System: Nanjing Metro

History
- Opened: 6 December 2017; 8 years ago

Technical
- Line length: 36.26 km (22.5 mi)
- Number of tracks: 2
- Character: Underground and Elevated
- Track gauge: 1,435 mm (4 ft 8 1/2 in)

Line S3 of the Nanjing Metro (Chinese: 南京地铁S3号线; pinyin: Nánjīng Dìtiě S-Sān Hào Xiàn), is a north-south suburban rapid transit line serving part of the southern and southwestern suburbs of Nanjing, running from Nanjing South Railway Station and Gaojiachong. It is the first line of the Nanjing Metro with passing tracks at select stations, allowing from distinct express local services. The first phase of the project is 36.22 km (22.51 mi) long with 19 stations, including 10 underground stations, 8 elevated stations and 1 ground station. The line crosses the Yangtze River using the Dashengguan Yangtze River Bridge. In 2012, the first phase of the project was approved by the NDRC for construction with the first section started construction on 27 December 2012. On August 13, 2017, the first phase of Line S3 started to be unmanned testing. The first phase of the line was completed by the end of 2017 and started trial operation on 6 December 2017.

== Opening timeline ==
Segment	Commencement	Length	Station(s)	Name
Nanjing South — Gaojiachong	6 December 2017	36.26 km (22.53 mi)	19	Ninghe ICR Phase 1

== Station list ==
Station name		Connections	Distance km		Location
English	Chinese	Connections	Distance km		Location
Nanjing South Railway Station	南京南站	1 3 6 S1 NKH	0.000	0.000	Yuhuatai / Jiangning
Jingmingjiayuan	景明佳园		1.963	1.963	Yuhuatai
Tiexinqiao	铁心桥		1.470	3.433	Yuhuatai
Chunjianglu	春江路		1.507	4.940	Yuhuatai
Jiaxi	贾西		1.446	6.386	Yuhuatai
Youfangqiao	油坊桥	2	1.608	7.994	Jianye
Yongchulu	永初路	7	1.187	9.181	Jianye
Pingliangdajie	平良大街	Hexi Tram	1.154	10.335	Jianye
Wuhoujie	吴侯街	Hexi Tram	0.949	11.284	Jianye
Gaomiaolu	高庙路		1.037	12.321	Jianye
Tianbao	天保		2.007	14.328	Yuhuatai
Liucun	刘村	9	1.525	15.853	Yuhuatai
Maluowei	马骡圩	11	9.844	25.697	Pukou
Lanhuatang	兰花塘		2.099	27.796	Pukou
Shuanglong	双垅		1.324	29.120	Pukou
Shiqihe	石碛河		1.471	30.591	Pukou
Qiaolinxincheng	桥林新城		1.350	31.941	Pukou
Linshan	林山		1.998	33.939	Pukou
Gaojiachong	高家冲		1.712	35.651	Pukou
