= Dashengguan Yangtze River Bridge =

Dashengguan Bridge 大胜关长江大桥
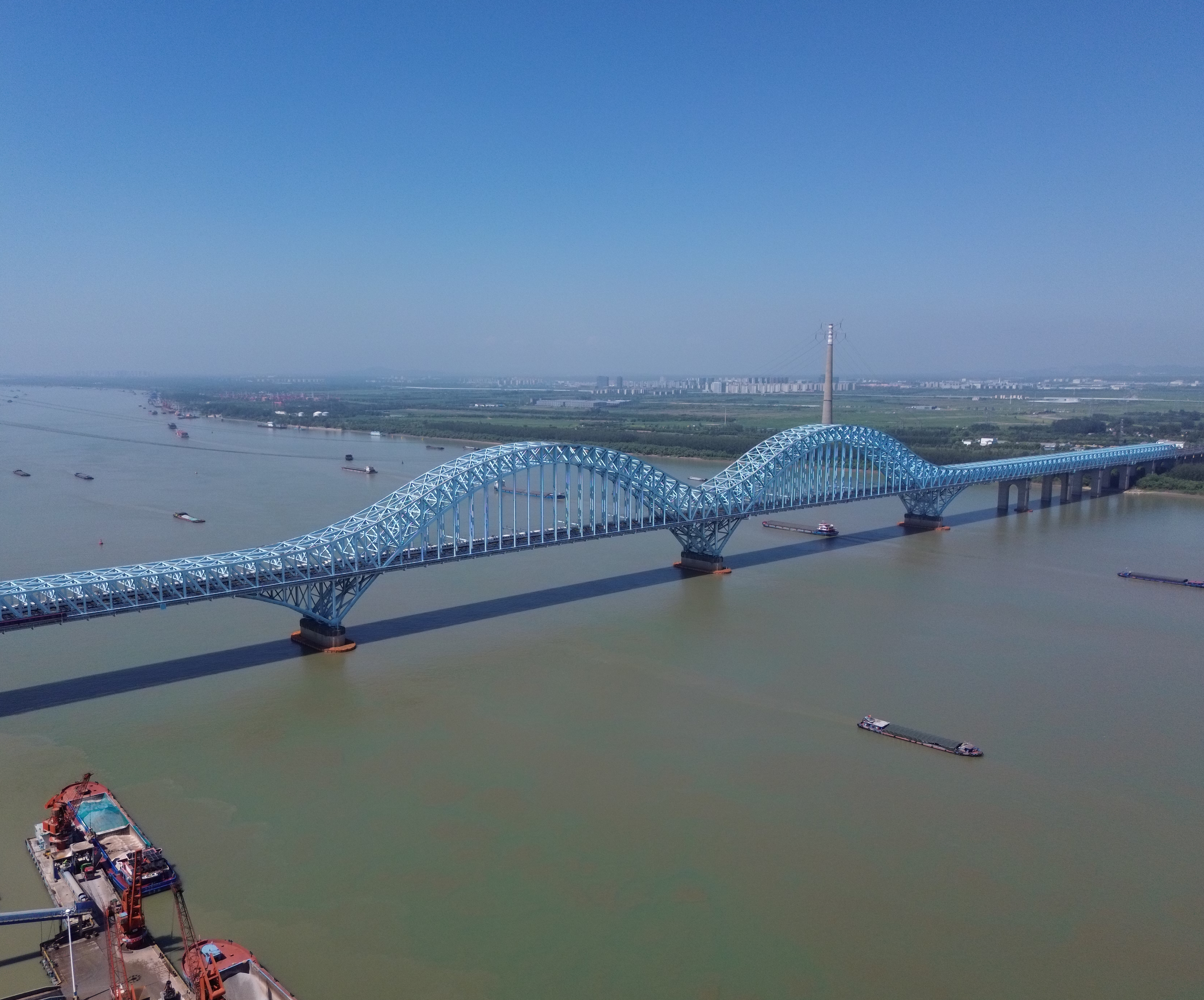
- Coordinates: 31.959833°N 118.630972°E
- Carries: 6 rail tracks: Beijing–Shanghai High-Speed Railway; Shanghai–Wuhan–Chengdu High-Speed Railway; Nanjing Metro Line S3
- Crosses: Yangtze River
- Locale: Nanjing, Jiangsu

Characteristics
- Design: Arch Bridge
- Total length: 1,615 m (5,299 ft)
- Longest span: 336 m (1,102 ft) (x2)

History
- Construction start: 2006
- Construction cost: $537 million USD
- Opened: 2011

Location
- Interactive map of Dashengguan Bridge

The Dashengguan Yangtze River Bridge (simplified Chinese: 大胜关长江大桥; traditional Chinese: 大勝關長江大橋; pinyin: Dàshèngguān Chángjiāng Dàqiáo; lit. 'pass of the great victory') crosses the Yangtze River in Nanjing, Jiangsu. Construction of the bridge started in 2006 and it was completed in 2010. The bridge has two main spans of 336 m (1,102 ft) it is one of the largest arch bridges in the world. It carries six tracks: two for the Beijing–Shanghai High-Speed Railway (opened on 30 June 2011), two for the Shanghai–Wuhan–Chengdu high-speed railway (opened on 22 January 2011) and two for line S3 of the Nanjing Metro (opened on 6 December 2017).

== See also ==
- Nanjing Yangtze River Bridge Older bridge that carries the "old" Beijing–Shanghai Railway.
- Beijing–Shanghai High-Speed Railway
- Yangtze River bridges and tunnels
- List of largest arch bridges
