= Gaojiachong station =

Metro station in Nanjing

Gaojiachong 高家冲
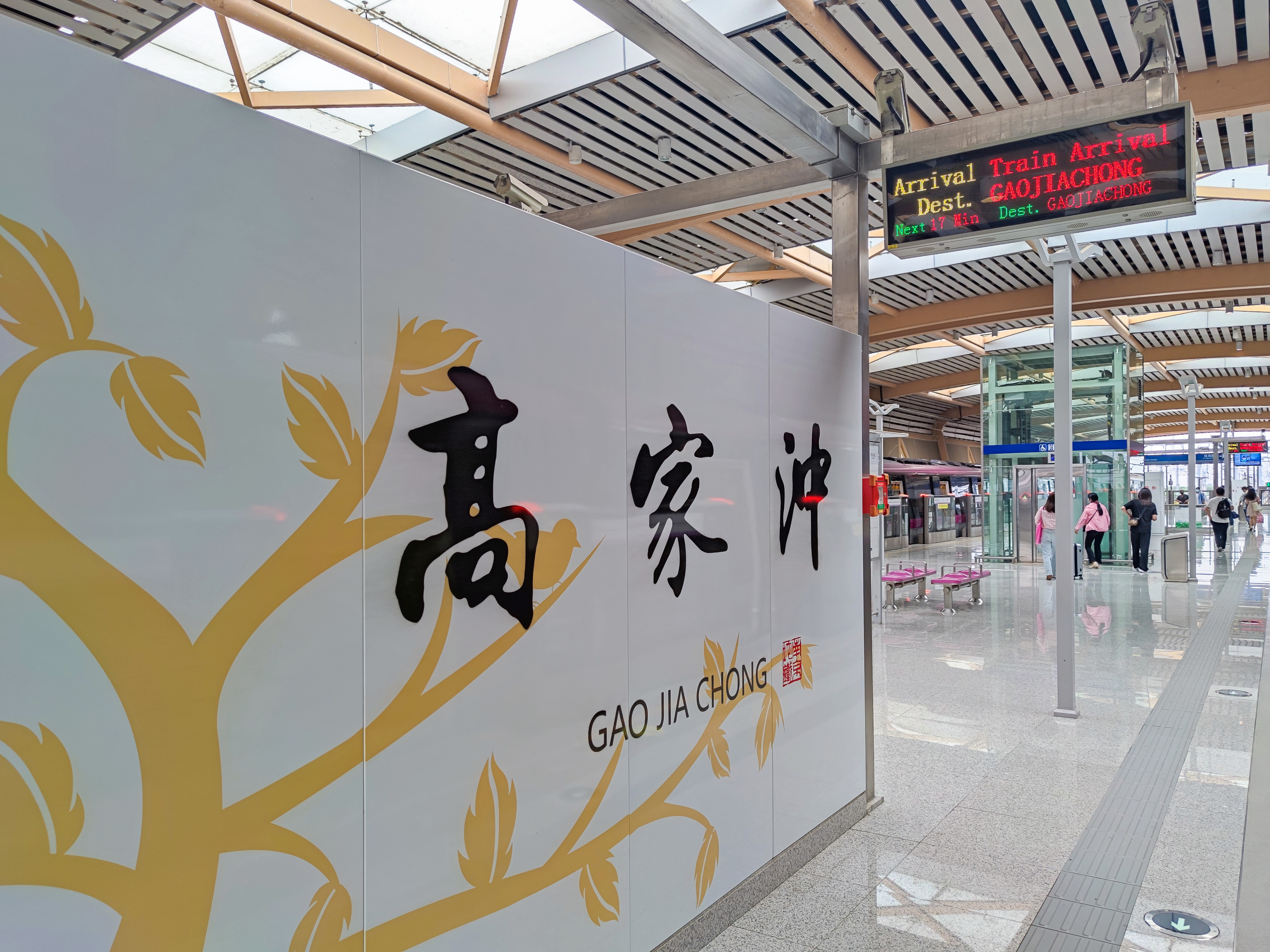

General information
- Location: Pukou District, Nanjing, Jiangsu; China
- Operated by: Nanjing Metro Co. Ltd.
- Line: Line S3

History
- Opened: 6 December 2017; 8 years ago

Services
Preceding station	Nanjing Metro	Following station
Linshan towards Nanjing South Railway Station	Line S3	Terminus
Location

Gaojiachong station (Chinese: 高家冲站) is a station of Line S3 of the Nanjing Metro. It started operations on 6 December 2017.
