= Zhu (surname) =

- Romanisation: Zhu (Mandarin); Chu (Cantonese); Gee (Taishanese); Choo (Hokkien)

Origin
- Meaning: Vermillion; named after the ancient State of Zhu (邾)
- Region of origin: Shandong

Other names
- Variant forms: 祝, 竺, 猪, 諸
- Related names: Zou (邹); Cao (also adopted by former subjects of Zou)

Chinese name
- Chinese: 朱
Transcriptions
Standard Mandarin
- Hanyu Pinyin: zhū
Yue: Cantonese
- Yale Romanization: zyu1
other Yue
- Taishanese: zi1
Southern Min
- Hokkien POJ: chu

Zhu is the pinyin romanization of five Chinese surnames: 朱, 祝, 竺, 猪 and 諸.

The most prominent of the five, Zhu (朱), is the 17th name in the Hundred Family Surnames poem and was the surname of the Ming dynasty emperors. It is alternatively spelled Chu (primarily in Hong Kong, Macau and Taiwan), Gee in the United States and Canada, and Choo (mostly in Singapore and Malaysia). As of 2018, it is the 14th most common surname in the People's Republic of China, with a population of around 18 million.

== Name ==
One interpretation is that 朱 refers to 朱雀 meaning vermillion. 朱 could also refer to cinnabar (朱砂). This is a completely different character from another Chu (楚), which is less common than Zhu.

== Origin and distribution ==
The ancestral surname (姓) of the ruling family of the State of Zhu (邾) was Cao. (p. 144, Xueqin). The State of Zou, as it was later renamed, was conquered and annexed by the state of Chu during the reign of King Xuan of Chu (369–340 BC). (p. 43, Chao). The ruling family and its descendants adopted Zhu (朱) as their surname in memory of their former state of Zhu (邾). (p. 43, Chao & p. 239, Tan).

During the Ming dynasty, some people of the Zhu clan moved to Taiwan, and others later migrated to Southeast Asia, Europe and the Americas. During the Qing dynasty the House of Zhu was purged by the House of Aisin-Gioro and the Manchu people who led the Qing armies. Many royal family members of the House of Zhu were executed at Caishikou Execution Grounds during the Qing dynasty. The Zhu clan is also found in Korea and is known as 주 (朱; Ju, Joo); it is the 32nd most common name in Korea though it is combined with the Zhou (周) surname (see List of Korean surnames).

Zhu (朱) is technically a branch of the Cao (曹) surname. Nowadays, Zhu is 14th most common, while Cao is 27th most common in terms of population size.

A 2013 study found that it was the 14th most common surnames, shared by 17,000,000 people or 1.280% of the population, with the province with the most being Jiangsu.

== Notable people surnamed 朱 ==
=== Historical figures ===
- Zhu Jun (Han dynasty), politician during the late Han dynasty; also a character in the Romance of the Three Kingdoms
- Zhu Ling, General of Cao Wei during the Three Kingdoms period
- Zhu Zhi, military general of Eastern Wu during the Three Kingdoms era of China
- Zhu Huan, military general of Eastern Wu during the Three Kingdoms era of China
- Zhu Ju, military general of Eastern Wu during the Three Kingdoms era of China
- Zhu Ran, military general of Eastern Wu during the Three Kingdoms era of China
- Zhu Can, an agrarian rebel leader during the disintegration of the Sui dynasty
- Zhu Jingze, official during the Tang dynasty and Wu Zetian's Zhou dynasty
- Zhu Mei, general during the Tang dynasty
- Zhu Pu, an official of the Tang dynasty, serving briefly as a chancellor during the reign of Emperor Zhaozong
- Zhu Jin, a warlord in the late Tang dynasty
- Zhu Ci, general and military governor under the Tang dynasty
- Zhu Tao, general under the Tang dynasty
- Zhu Kerong, grandson of Zhu Tao and military governor under the Tang dynasty
- Zhu Yansi, general of the Tang dynasty
- Zhu Xicai, general and military governor under the Tang dynasty
- Zhu Quanzhong, founder of the Later Liang
- Zhu Yougui, second emperor of the Later Liang
- Zhu Youzhen, third emperor of the Later Liang
- Zhu Yuanzhang, Founding Emperor of the Ming dynasty
- Zhu Yunwen, Second Emperor of the Ming dynasty
- Zhu Biao, the Hongwu Emperor's first son and Crown Prince
- Zhu Quan, Prince of Ning, Seventeenth son of the Hongwu Emperor and younger half-brother to the Yongle Emperor; military commander, historian and playwright
- Zhu Zaiyu, Prince of Zheng, a sixth-generation descendant of the Hongxi Emperor, the fourth emperor of the Ming dynasty; a musician and one of the first people to describe equal temperament in music in 1584
- Zhu Chenhao, Prince of Ning; 5th generation descendant of Zhu Quan, Prince of Ning; a rebel Prince
- Zhu Zhifan, Prince of Anhua; a rebel Prince
- Zhu Changqing, Prince of Huai, Ming pretender reigning as Emperor Dongwu of the Southern Ming dynasty
- Hongguang Emperor, born Zhu Yousong, Prince of Fu; Ming pretender and emperor of the Southern Ming dynasty which resisted the Qing dynasty
- Longwu Emperor, born Zhu Yujian, Prince of Tang; Ming pretender and emperor of the Southern Ming dynasty
- Yongli Emperor, born Zhu Youlang, Prince of Gui; Ming pretender and emperor of the Southern Ming dynasty
- Prince of Lu, born Zhu Yihai; a leader of the Southern Ming dynasty
- Prince of Ningjing, born Zhu Shugui; ninth-generation descendant of Zhu Yuanzhang, the founder of the Ming dynasty of China, via the line of his 15th son, Zhu Zhi, the Prince of Liao; a leader of the Southern Ming dynasty
- Koxinga whose title literally means Lord with the Imperial Surname; he was born Zheng Chenggong but given the right to bear the imperial surname, Zhu, by the Longwu Emperor, a pretender to the then collapsing Ming dynasty, for his noteworthy loyalist efforts; Koxinga founded the short-lived Kingdom of Taiwan

=== Government, politics and military ===
- Zhu Guohua, grandson of Zhu De and sentenced to death for rape
- Zhu Fulin, former deputy mayor of Jinhua and sentenced to life imprisonment for bribery
- Cyrus Chu (born 1955), Minister of National Science Council of the Republic of China (2011–2014)
- Zhu Binhou, a military aviation pioneer and WWI veteran pilot who flown combat missions for the Armée de l'Air
- Zhu Maichen, an impoverished student working as woodcutter; his wife divorced him to remarry a richer man; subsequently he became a provincial governor under Emperor Wu of Han; he rejected his ex-wife's subsequent attempts at reconciliation and is credited with the Chinese proverb: "Poured water cannot be retrieved". His biography is recorded in Volume 64 of the Book of Han
- Zhu Pu, a writer who briefly worked for the Wang Jingwei regime.
- Zhu Youqian, a warlord in the late Tang dynasty, he was falsely accused of plotting a rebellion and Emperor Zhuanzong put him and his entire family to death
- Ju Hala (Sinicized: 朱氏), a Manchu clan during the Qing dynasty, perhaps founded by and composed of assimilated Han Chinese of the Zhu surname. One example might be Zhu Guozhi (朱國治), a Chinese Bannerman in the Eight Banners during the Qing dynasty who was appointed the governor of Yunnan. He was captured by Wu Sangui in 1674 and died cursing the rebels. In 1742, he was included into the Temple of Patriots. Zhu Hongzhang could possibly be regarded as another example. The Marquis of Extended Grace and his heirs, who were the officially designated heirs of the Ming dynasty by the Qing dynasty, were inducted into the Plain White Banner of the Eight Banners system
- Zhu Hongzhang, a loyalist general during the Qing dynasty; he helped put down the Taiping Rebellion
- Zhu Zhixin, comrade of Sun Yat-sen who named Zhixin High School after his dead comrade
- Zhu Shaoliang, general in the National Revolutionary Army of the Republic of China
- Zhu Lühe, a politician and judicial officer in the Republic of China; he became an important politician during the Reformed Government of the Republic of China and the Wang Jingwei regime
- Zhu Shen, a politician and public prosecutor in the Republic of China; he became an important politician during the Provisional Government of the Republic of China and the Wang Jingwei regime
- Zhu Pei-De, General
- Zhu De, co-founder of the Chinese Red Army, forerunner of the People's Liberation Army
- Zhu Qi, general of the People's Liberation Army; currently commander of the Beijing Military Region
- Zhu Jiahua, famous politician of the Republic of China
- Sir Moilin Jean Ah-Chuen (朱梅麟), a Sino-Mauritian politician and business man from Mauritius. He became First Chinese Cabinet Minister from 1967 to 1976 and First Chinese Member, Legislative Council in 1949. He was knighted by Queen Elizabeth II.
- Zhu Rongji, former PRC Premier; he is a direct descendant of the Hongwu Emperor of the Ming dynasty
- David S. C. Chu, United States Under Secretary of Defense appointed by George W. Bush
- Jim Chu, Chief Constable of the Vancouver Police Department
- Zhu Qizhen, former Vice Foreign Minister and Ambassador to the United States
- Steven Chu, the 12th United States Secretary of Energy
- Eric Chu, a former Vice Premier of the Republic of China; subsequently the first Mayor of New Taipei
- Choo Han Teck, a Judge of the Supreme Court of Singapore
- Choo Wee Khiang (朱为强), former Singaporean politician
  - Desmond Choo (朱倍慶), nephew of Choo Wee Khiang, Singaporean politician
- Susan Chu (朱俶賢), wife of former Taiwan (ROC) Vice President Vincent Siew
- Zhu Hailun, Deputy Party Secretary of the Xinjiang Uyghur Autonomous Region
- Carmen Chu, Assessor-Recorder of the City and County of San Francisco since 2013
- Zhu Fenglian, deputy director and Spokesperson of the Information Bureau at the Taiwan Affairs Office of the State Council since 2019
- Chu Yiu-ming, One of the founders of the Occupy Central
- Samuel Chu, Founder and President of The Campaign for Hong Kong
- Zhu Liang (1924–2025), politician, Head of the International Department of the Chinese Communist Party

=== Philosophy and religion ===
- Zhu Xi, Song-dynasty scholar and main proponent for Neo-Confucianism; he was elevated to a position of honor in the Temple of Confucius several decades after his death and recognized as the third sage of Confucianism after Confucius and Mencius during the reign of the Kangxi Emperor of the Qing dynasty
- Zhu Qianzhi, Chinese intellectual and historian; influenced Mao Zedong

=== Arts ===
- Zhu Da, renowned painter and calligrapher of the Qing dynasty; agnatic descendant of Zhu Quan, Prince of Ning
- Zhu Dake, Chinese scholar, cultural critic and essayist
- Zhu Ziqing, renowned writer and poet
- Zhu Jian'er, a prominent Chinese composer
- Zhu Xiao-Mei, Chinese classical pianist and teacher
- Chu Yibing, cellist
- Zhu Xiao Di, Chinese-American writer
- Zhu Wen, Chinese short story writer turned director
- Joyce Chu, Malaysian singer-songwriter and actress
- Julie Zhu, New Zealand documentary filmmaker, podcaster and photographer

=== Science and technology ===
- Zhu Shijie, Chinese mathematician
- Steven Chu, one of three co-recipients of the 1997 Nobel Prize in Physics; 12th US Secretary of Energy
- Chu Ching-wu, renowned physicist; expert on superconductivity
- Gilbert Chu, professor of medicine and biochemistry at Stanford Medical School; older brother of Steven Chu, the 12th US Secretary of Energy
- Jun Zhu, statistician and entomologist
- Zhu Xiping, professor of mathematics at Sun Yat-sen University; winner of the 2004 Morningside Medal of Mathematics at the Third International Congress of Chinese Mathematicians (ICCM)
- Zhu Qingshi, famous chemist, member of the Royal Society of Chemistry. He was the former president of the University of Science and Technology of China. He was also a delegate of the 8th and 9th National People's Congress, and the 10th National Committee of the Chinese People's Political Consultative Conference.

=== Business ===
- Zhu Chuanfeng, businessman sentenced to death for selling gutter oil
- Zhu Chuanqing, businessman sentenced to life in prison for selling gutter oil
- Zhu Chuanbo, businessman sentenced to life in prison for selling gutter oil
- David Chu, Taiwanese-American, founder of Nautica, men's designer outerwear company
- Zhu Baoguo, Chinese billionaire, founder of Joincare Pharmaceutical Group Industrial
- Zhu Gongshan, Chinese billionaire, founder of GCL-Poly Energy Holdings Limited, an energy supplier in China
- Zhu Huiming, Chinese billionaire, founder of Hangzhou Binjiang Real Estate Group
- Zhu Jun (businessman), Chinese industrialist and businessman; Chairman of Nasdaq listed company, the Nine City (NASDAQ: NCTY); also chairman of the Shanghai Shenhua football club.
- Chu Lam Yiu (朱林瑤), chairwoman and CEO, Huabao International Holdings
- Zhu Mengyi (朱孟依), Chairman of Guangdong Zhujiang Invest, Hopson Development
- Zhu Xingliang, Chinese billionaire, founder of Suzhou Gold Mantis Construction Decoration
- Zhu Xinli, Chinese multi-millionaire, founder and chairman of China Huiyuan Juice Group
- Zhu Yicai, Chinese billionaire, founder and chairman of China Yurun Group
- Zhu Yunlai, CEO of China International Capital Corp; he is the son of Zhu Rongji, former Premier of the People's Republic of China, and a direct descendant of the Hongwu Emperor of the Ming dynasty

=== Sports and entertainment ===
- Alex "Xpecial" Chu, American League of Legends player
- Choo Hoey, Singaporean musician and conductor; formerly music director of the Singapore Symphony Orchestra
- Choo Seng Quee, former national football coach of Indonesia, Malaysia and Singapore.
- Ken Chu, F4 member
- Dadawa, real name Zhu Zheqin; singer/songwriter/indie producer, who is well known for her vocalization
- Julie Chu, U.S. Olympic Team hockey player
- Jon M. Chu, American film director and screenwriter
- Loletta Chu, Ethnic Chinese from Myanmar; winner of the 1977 Miss Hong Kong Pageant
- Athena Chu (朱茵), Hong Kong actress
- Zhu Jianhua, P.R.C. Olympic high jumper
- Zhu Jingyi (archer), Chinese archer
- Zhu Lin, a Chinese badminton player
- Zhu Ling (volleyball), a Chinese volleyball player who competed in the 1984 Summer Olympics
- Chu Lanlan, Chinese opera singer
- Chu Mu-yen 朱木炎, Hakka Chinese; Gold medalist, Taekwondo, 2004 Athens Olympics; Champion, World Taekwondo Championships, 2003
- Nathan Tjoe-A-On, Indonesian footballer
- Zhu Shenglong (born 2000), Chinese hurdler
- Zhu Xiaolin, a Chinese long-distance runner, who specialises in marathon running; won the Xiamen International Marathon and was third at the 2010 Rotterdam Marathon. She represented China at the 2008 Beijing Olympics
- Zhu Yawen, Chinese actor
- Zhu Yilong, Chinese actor and singer
- Zhu Yuanling, Chinese skateboarder
- Zhu Yuanyuan, Chinese actress
- Zhu Yunying, Chinese volleyball player
- Zhu Zhengting, Chinese singer, dancer and actor, former member of Nine Percent and member of NEXT
- Zhu Zhu, Chinese actress and singer who rose to fame as a host for MTV China
- Zhu Zifeng, Chinese diver

=== Miscellaneous ===
- Zhu Haiyang, Virginia Tech murderer who decapitated Yang Xin
- Zhu Xianjian, North Korean defector and robber
- Morgan Chu, an intellectual property attorney and one of the first Asian Americans to lead a major U.S. law, Irell & Manella LLP; younger brother of Steven Chu, the 12th US Secretary of Energy
- Zhu Ling (poisoning victim), victim of an unsolved 1995 thallium poisoning case in Beijing, China
- Zhu Min (economist), Chinese economist and is Deputy Managing Director of the International Monetary Fund

=== Foreign ===
- Chu Văn An (朱文安), a Confucian, teacher, physician and high-ranking mandarin of the Trần dynasty in Đại Việt
- Châu Văn Tiếp (朱文接), an 18th-century Vietnamese military commander, best known for his role as a general of Nguyễn Ánh
- Sinan Joo clan, a Korean clan descended from Neo-Confucian philosopher Zhu Xi
- Ju Ji-hoon (朱智勳), model and actor from South Korea

== See also ==
- Zhu (state)
- House of Zhu
- Yan Emperor

== Reading ==
- Brook, Timothy, 1998, The Confucian of Pleasure: Commerce and Culture in Ming China, University of California Press. ISBN 0-520-21091-3
- Chao, Sheau-yueh J., 2000, "In Search of Your Asian Roots: Genealogical Research on Chinese Surnames", Clearfield. ISBN 0-8063-4946-8
- Li, Chi, 1967, "The Formation of the Chinese People: An Anthropological Inquiry", Russell & Russell. U.S. Library of Congress Card No: 66-27117.
- Li Xueqin, 1985 "Eastern Zhou and Qin Civilizations", (K.C. Chang trans.). Yale University Press. ISBN 0-300-03286-2
- Mote, F.W., 1999, "Imperial China 900 - 1800", Harvard University Press. ISBN 0-674-44515-5
- Paludan, Ann, 1998, "Chronicle of the Chinese Emperors: The Reign-By-Reign Record of the Rulers of Imperial China", Thames & Hudson. ISBN 0-500-05090-2
- Paludan, Ann, 1981, "The Imperial Ming Imperial Tombs", Yale University Press. ISBN 0-300-02511-4
- Tan, Thomas Tsu-wee, 1986, "Your Chinese Roots: The Overseas Chinese Story", Times Books International. ISBN 0-89346-285-3
- Wu, Kuo-Cheng, 1982, The Chinese Heritage. Crown Publishers, Inc. ISBN 0-517-54475-X
