= The Most Recent Biographies of Chinese Dignitaries =

1941 Japanese biographical dictionary

Chinese name
- Traditional Chinese: 最新支那要人傳
- Simplified Chinese: 最新支那要人传
Transcriptions
Standard Mandarin
- Hanyu Pinyin: Zuìxīn Zhīnà Yàorén Zhuàn
- Wade–Giles: Tsui-hsin Chih-na Yao-jen Chuan

Japanese name
- Kanji: 最新支那要人伝
Transcriptions
- Romanization: Saishin Shina Yōjin Den

The Most Recent Biographies of Chinese Dignitaries (Chinese: 最新支那要人傳, Japanese: 最新支那要人伝) is a guide to prominent individuals in the Republic of China, compiled in Japan by The Asahi Shimbun newspaper during the Second Sino-Japanese War. Published on 2 February 1941, the work references 343 contemporary notables in the Kuomintang and the Nationalist government, the Chinese Communist Party, the pro-Japanese Wang Jingwei regime and Mengjiang, and independent politicians and celebrities.

A digitization of the reference work can be found on the website of the National Diet Library of Japan, the full list of biographies follows.

== Biographies ==
The following list is arranged in gojūon order, based on the Japanese pronunciation of the names.

=== 1 to 25 ===
No.	Photo	Name (Chinese)	Name (romanization)
1		阿勒坦鄂齊爾	Altanochir
2		殷汝耕	Yin Rugeng
3		殷同	Yin Tong
4		于學忠	Yu Xuezhong
5		于品卿	Yu Pinqing
6		于右任	Yu Youren
7		烏古廷	Wu Guting
8		衛立煌	Wei Lihuang
9		袁禮敦	Wang Ludeng
10		閻錫山	Yan Xishan
11		王揖唐	Wang Yitang
12		王蔭泰	Wang Yintai
13		王永泉	Wang Yongquan
14		王家楨	Wang Jiazhen
15		王景岐	Wang Jingqi
16		王曉籟	Wang Xiaolai
17		王克敏	Wang Kemin
18		王纘緒	Wang Zuanxu
19		王修	Wang Xiu
20		王樹翰	Wang Shuhan
21		王樹常	Wang Shuchang
22		王世杰	Wang Shijie
23		王正廷	Wang Zhengting
24		王靖國	Wang Jingguo
25		王造時	Wang Zaoshi

=== 26 to 50 ===
No.	Photo	Name (Chinese)	Name (romanization)
26		王大楨	Wang Dazhen
27		王寵惠	Wang Chonghui
28		王伯群	Wang Boqun
29		王陸一	Wang Luyi
30		汪時璟	Wang Shijing
31		汪精衛	Wang Zhaoming
32		汪祖澤	Wang Zuze
33		汪道源	Wang Daoyuan
34		翁照垣	Weng Zhaoyuan
35		翁文灝	Weng Wenhao
36		歐大慶	Ou Daqing
37		恩克巴圖	Enkhbat
38		温世珍	Wen Shizhen
39		溫宗堯	Wen Zongyao
40		何應欽	He Yingqin
41		何鍵	He Jian
42		何香凝	He Xiangning
43		何成濬	He Chengjun
44		何素璞	He Supu
45		何庭流	He Tingliu
46		何東	Robert Hotung
47		何佩瑢	He Peirong
48		何廉	He Lian
49		夏奇峰	Xia Qifeng
50		夏恭	Xia Gong

=== 51 to 75 ===
No.	Photo	Name (Chinese)	Name (romanization)
51		夏肅初	Xia Suchu
52		夏晉麟	Xia Jinlin
53		賈士毅	Jia Shiyi
54		賀國光	He Guoguang
55		賀耀組	He Yaozu
56		郭衛民	Guo Weimin
57		郭泰祺	Guo Taiqi
58		郭沫若	Guo Moruo
59		郭爾卓爾札普	Gorjorjab
60		岳開先	Yue Kaixian
61		甘介侯	Gan Jiehou
62		甘乃光	Gan Naiguang
63		關麟徴	Guan Linzheng
64		顔惠慶	Yan Huiqing
65		魏道明	Wei Daoming
66		居正	Ju Zheng
67		許繼祥	Xu Jixiang
68		許修直	Xu Xiuzhi
69		許少榮	Xu Shaorong
70		許崇灝	Xu Chonghao
71		許崇清	Xu Chongqing
72		許崇智	Xu Chongzhi
73		許世英	Xu Shiying
74		金永昌	Jin Yongchang
75		金馥生	Jin Fusheng

=== 76 to 100 ===
No.	Photo	Name (Chinese)	Name (romanization)
76		金問泗	Jin Wensi
77		虞和德	Yu Hede
78		嚴家熾	Yan Jiachi
79		胡適	Hu Shih
80		胡文虎	Aw Boon Haw
81		胡霖	Hu Lin
82		顧維鈞	Koo Vi-kyuin
83		顧祝同	Gu Zhutong
84		顧孟餘	Gu Mengyu
85		吳鶴齡	Wu Heling
86		吳敬恆	Wu Jingheng
87		吳思豫	Wu Siyu
88		吳忠信	Wu Zhongxin
89		吳鼎昌	Wu Dingchang
90		吳鐵城	Wu Tiecheng
91		孔祥熙	Kung Hsiang-hsi
92		江亢虎	Jiang Kanghu
93		江朝宗	Jiang Chaozong
94		香翰屏	Xiang Hanping
95		高一涵	Gao Yihan
96		高冠吾	Gao Guanwu
97		高宗武	Gao Zongwu
98		黃炎培	Huang Yanpei
99		黃季陸	Huang Jilu
100		黃琪翔	Huang Qixiang

=== 101 to 125 ===
No.	Photo	Name (Chinese)	Name (romanization)
101		黄旭初	Huang Xuchu
102		項英	Xiang Ying
103		谷鐘秀	Gu Zhongxiu
104		谷正綱	Ku Cheng-kang
105		谷正鼎	Ku Cheng-ting
106		谷正倫	Ku Cheng-lun
107		蔡廷鍇	Cai Tingkai
108		蔡培	Cai Pei
109		施肇基	Alfred Sao-ke Sze
110		謝冠生	Xie Guansheng
111		朱家骅	Zhu Jiahua
112		朱桂山	Zhu Guishan
113		朱經農	Zhu Jingnong
114		朱紹良	Zhu Shaoliang
115		朱深	Zhu Shen
116		朱霽青	Zhu Jiqing
117		朱德	Zhu De
118		朱樸	Zhu Pu
119		朱履龢	Zhu Lühe
120		周恩來	Zhou Enlai
121		周化人	Zhou Huaren
122		周家彥	Zhou Jiayan
123		周啟剛	Zhou Qigang
124		周鯁生	Zhou Gengsheng
125		周作人	Zhou Zuoren

=== 126 to 150 ===
No.	Photo	Name (Chinese)	Name (romanization)
126		周作民	Zhou Zuomin
127		周震麟	Zhou Zhenlin
128		周佛海	Zhou Fohai
129		周隆庠	Zhou Longxiang
130		諸青來	Zhu Qinglai
131		徐永昌	Xu Yongchang
132		徐謙	Xu Qian
133		徐源泉	Xu Yuanquan
134		徐淑希	Xu Shuxi
135		徐謨	Xu Mo
136		徐良	Xu Liang
137		邵力子	Shao Lizi
138		松津旺楚克	Songjin Wangchuke
139		商震	Shang Zhen
140		章士釗	Zhang Shizhao
141		章乃器	Zhang Naiqi
142		焦易堂	Jiao Yitang
143		蔣介石	Chiang Kai-shek
144		蒋作賓	Jiang Zuobin
145		蔣廷黻	Jiang Tingfu
146		蔣鼎文	Jiang Dingwen
147		蔣夢麟	Jiang Menglin
148		蕭吉珊	Xiao Jishan
149		蕭同茲	Xiao Tongzi
150		聶其杰	Nie Qijie

=== 151 to 175 ===
No.	Photo	Name (Chinese)	Name (romanization)
151		植子卿	Zhi Ziqing
152		岑德廣	Cen Deguang
153		秦汾	Qin Fen
154		鄒韜奮	Zou Taofen
155		鄒琳	Zou Lin
156		鄒魯	Zou Lu
157		成仿吾	Cheng Fangwu
158		齊燮元	Qi Xieyuan
159		石星川	Shi Xingchuang
160		石友三	Shi Yousan
161		薛岳	Xue Yue
162		錢永銘	Qian Yongming
163		錢大鈞	Qian Dajun
164		蘇體仁	Su Tiren
165		宋靄齡	Soong Ai-ling
166		宋慶齡	Soong Ching-ling
167		宋子文	Soong Tse-vung
168		宋子良	Soong Ziliang
169		宋美齡	Soong Mei-ling
170		曹浩森	Cao Haosen
171		曹若山	Cao Ruoshan
172		曹汝霖	Cao Rulin
173		曾擴情	Zeng Kuoqing
174		曾養甫	Zeng Yangfu
175		孫科	Sun Fo

=== 176 to 200 ===
No.	Photo	Name (Chinese)	Name (romanization)
176		孫連仲	Sun Lianzhong
177		太虛	Taixu
178		戴英夫	Dai Yingfu
179		戴傳賢	Dai Chuanxian
180		卓特巴札普	Jodbajab
181		達賴喇嘛	14th Dalai Lama
182		覃振	Qin Zhen
183		鈕永建	Niu Yongjian
184		褚民誼	Chu Minyi
185		刁作謙	Diao Zuoqian
186		刁敏謙	Diao Minqian
187		張維翰	Zhang Weihan
188		張蔭梧	Zhang Yinwu
189		張英華	Zhang Yinghua
190		張嘉璈	Zhang Jia'ao
191		張嘉森	Carsun Chang
192		張學良	Chang Hsueh-liang
193		張群	Zhang Qun
194		張繼	Zhang Ji
195		張國燾	Zhang Guotao
196		張熾章	Zhang Jiluan
197		張治中	Zhang Zhizhong
198		張人傑	Zhang Renjie
199		張仁蠡	Zhang Renli
200		張東蓀	Zhang Dongsun

=== 201 to 225 ===
No.	Photo	Name (Chinese)	Name (romanization)
201		張道藩	Zhang Daofan
202		張發奎	Zhang Fakui
203		趙毓松	Zhao Yusong
204		趙祺	Zhao Qi
205		趙正平	Zhao Zhengping
206		趙戴文	Zhao Daiwen
207		趙丕廉	Zhao Pilian
208		沈鈞儒	Shen Junru
209		沈覲鼎	Shen Jinding
210		沈鴻烈	Shen Honglie
211		沈士遠	Shen Shiyuan
212		沈嗣良	Shen Siliang
213		陳介	Chen Jie
214		陳其采	Chen Qicai
215		陳儀	Chen Yi
216		陳玉銘	Chen Yuming
217		陳果夫	Chen Guofu
218		陳群	Chen Qun
219		陳公博	Chen Gongbo
220		陳光甫	Chen Guangfu
221		陳濟棠	Chen Jitang
222		陳樹人	Chen Shuren
223		陳紹寬	Chen Shaokuan
224		陳誠	Chen Cheng
225		陳中孚	Chen Zhongfu

=== 226 to 250 ===
No.	Photo	Name (Chinese)	Name (romanization)
226		陳調元	Chen Diaoyuan
227		陳獨秀	Chen Duxiu
228		陳布雷	Chen Bulei
229		陳孚木	Chen Fumu
230		陳銘枢	Chen Mingshu
231		陳友仁	Chen Youren
232		陳立夫	Chen Lifu
233		陳廉仲	Chen Lianzhong
234		丁惟汾	Ding Weifen
235		丁其昌	Ding Qichang
236		丁默邨	Ding Mocun
237		丁玲	Ding Ling
238		程潛	Cheng Qian
239		程天放	Cheng Tianfang
240		鄭毓秀	Zheng Yuxiu
241		杜運宇	Du Yunyu
242		杜月笙	Du Yuesheng
243		唐仰杜	Tang Yangshe
244		唐生智	Tang Shengzhi
245		陶希聖	Tao Xisheng
246		陶克陶	Tao Ketao
247		陶履謙	Tao Luqian
248		湯恩伯	Tang Enbo
249		湯爾和	Tang Erhe
250		湯澄波	Tang Chengbo

=== 251 to 275 ===
No.	Photo	Name (Chinese)	Name (romanization)
251		湯良禮	Tang Liangli
252		董顯光	Dong Xianguang
253		董康	Dong Kang
254		鄧穎超	Deng Yingchao
255		鄧錫侯	Deng Xihou
256		德王	Demchugdongrub
257		任援道	Ren Yuandao
258		巴薩爾	Basar Gord
259		馬寅初	Ma Yinchu
260		馬永魁	Ma Yongkui
261		馬君武	Ma Junwu
262		馬鴻逵	Ma Hongkui
263		馬仲英	Ma Zhongying
264		馬超俊	Ma Chaojun
265		馬良	Ma Liang
266		馬麟	Ma Lin
267		白雲梯	Bai Yunti
268		白崇禧	Bai Chongxi
269		柏文蔚	Bai Wenwei
270		莫德惠	Mo Dehui
271		潘毓桂	Pan Yugui
272		潘芸閣	Pan Yunge
273		潘雲超	Pan Yunchao
274		潘公展	Pan Gongzhan
275		馮玉祥	Feng Yuxiang

=== 276 to 300 ===
No.	Photo	Name (Chinese)	Name (romanization)
276		馮節	Feng Jie
277		繆斌	Miao Bin
278		富雙英	Fu Shuangying
279		傅作義	Fu Zuoyi
280		傅式說	Fu Shiyue
281		傅筱庵	Fu Xiaoan
282		補英達賴	Bayingdalai
283		方宗鰲	Fang Zong'ao
284		彭學沛	Peng Xuepei
285		彭東原	Peng Dongyuan
286		彭德懷	Peng Dehuai
287		鮑文樾	Bao Wenyue
288		茅盾	Mao Dun
289		穆湘玥	Mu Xiangyue
290		毛澤東	Mao Zedong
291		俞鴻鈞	Yu Hung-chun
292		俞飛鵬	Yu Feipeng
293		熊式輝	Xiong Shihui
294		余漢謀	Yu Hanmou
295		余晉龢	Yu Jinhe
296		姚作賓	Yao Zuobin
297		葉恭綽	Ye Gongchuo
298		葉劍英	Ye Jianying
299		葉楚傖	Ye Chucang
300		葉挺	Ye Ting

=== 301 to 325 ===
No.	Photo	Name (Chinese)	Name (romanization)
301		葉蓬	Ye Feng
302		楊杰	Yang Jie
303		楊虎	Yang Hu
304		楊虎城	Yang Hucheng
305		楊庶堪	Yang Shukan
306		楊森	Yang Sen
307		羅文幹	Luo Wengan
308		雷壽榮	Lei Shourong
309		李煜瀛	Li Shizeng
310		李漢魂	Li Hanhun
311		李錦綸	Li Jinlun
312		李根源	Li Genyuan
313		李濟深	Li Jishen
314		李士群	Li Shiqun
315		李思賢	Li Sixian
316		李守信	Li Shouxin
317		李聖五	Li Shengwu
318		李祖虞	Li Zuyu
319		李宗仁	Li Zongren
320		李道軒	Li Daoxuan
321		李品仙	Li Pinxian
322		李銘	Li Ming
323		李烈鈞	Li Liejun
324		劉郁芬	Liu Yufen
325		劉紀文	Liu Jiwen

=== 326 to 343 ===
No.	Photo	Name (Chinese)	Name (romanization)
326		劉峙	Liu Zhi
327		劉尚清	Liu Shangqing
328		劉瑞恆	Liu Ruiheng
329		劉文輝	Liu Wenhui
330		劉文島	Liu Wendao
331		龍雲	Long Yun
332		梁寒操	Liang Hancao
333		梁鴻志	Liang Hongzhi
334		梁漱溟	Liang Shuming
335		林語堂	Lin Yutang
336		林汝珩	Lin Ruheng
337		林森	Lin Sen
338		林祖涵	Lin Boqu
339		林柏生	Lin Bosheng
340		林彪	Lin Biao
341		盧鏡如	Lu Jingru
342		盧用川	Lu Yongchuan
343		鹿鍾麟	Lu Zhonglin
