= Xia Suchu =

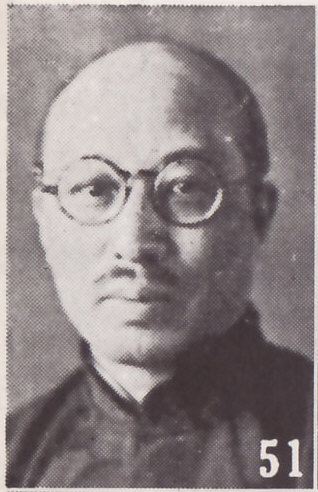
- Xia Suchu as pictured in The Most Recent Biographies of Chinese Dignitaries
- Born: 1889; Maha, Guizhou, Qing dynasty
- Died: after February 1943
- Occupation: Politician

Xia Suchu (simplified Chinese: 夏肃初; traditional Chinese: 夏肅初; pinyin: Xià Sùchū; Wade–Giles: Hsia Su-ch'u; 1889–?) was a politician in the Chinese Republic. He was an important politician during the Provisional Government of the Republic of China and the Wang Jingwei regime (Republic of China-Nanjing). His art-name was Xuchu (旭初). He was born in Maha (麻哈, now in Duyun), Guizhou.

== Biography ==
Xia Suchu went to Japan where he successively graduated the 1st Junior High School of Kyoto (京都府立第一中学) and the 1st High School (ja:第一高等学校 (旧制)). Later he returned to China, he belonged to Huang Fu, and worked in the Beiping Political Affairs Readjustment Commission (駐平政務整理委員會). In December 1935 the Hebei–Chahar Political Council was established, he also worked in it.

In December 1937 Wang Kemin established the Provisional Government of the Republic of China. Xia Suchu also participated in it, and was appointed a director to the Relief Bureau. In next September he was appointed a director to the General Affairs Bureau of the Ministry for Interior, and supported Minister Wang Yitang.

In March 1940 the Wang Jingwei regime was established, Xia Suchu was appointed Executive Vice-chief to the Evaluation Department of the Examination Yuan (考試院銓敘部常務次長). In the same May he was transferred to Chief Secretary of the Examination Yuan. In next July he was transferred to Chief to the Agency for Secretary of the North China Political Council (華北政務委員會). In March 1942 he was appointed to the Chief to the Agency for State Affairs of the same Council. In next February he resigned his post.

The whereabouts of Xia Suchu from after this point are unknown.

== See also ==
- List of people who disappeared mysteriously (pre-1910)

== Footnotes ==
- Liu Shoulin (刘寿林) (etc.ed.) (1995). The Chronological Table of the Republic's Officer (民国职官年表). Zhonghua Book Company (Zhonghua Shuju; 中华书局). ISBN 7-101-01320-1.
- Committee for Problems of East Asia (東亜問題調査会） (1941). The Biographies of Most Recent Chinese Important People (最新支那要人伝). Asahi Shimbun.
