= Yin Tong =

Chinese politician and military personnel (1889–1942)

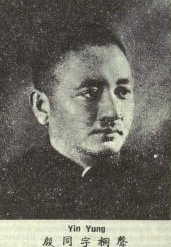
Yin Tong (Who's Who in China 5th ed., 1936)

Yin Tong (Chinese: 殷同; pinyin: Yīn Tóng; Wade–Giles: Yin T'ung; 1889 – December 30, 1942) was a politician and military personnel in the Republic of China. He was an important person during the Provisional Government of the Republic of China and Wang Jingwei regime. His courtesy name was Tongsheng (桐聲). He was born in Jiangyin, Jiangsu.

== Biography ==
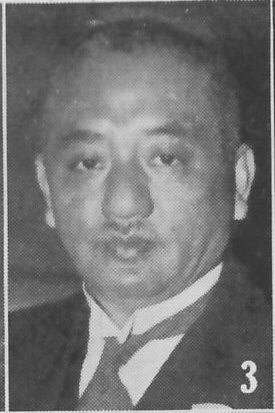
Yin Tong as pictured in The Most Recent Biographies of Chinese Dignitaries

After graduating the Nanjing Fourth Military Junior High School, Yin Tong went to Japan where he graduated the Military Account School (ja:陸軍経理学校). Later he returned to China, in 1913, he was appointed chief staff officer to the 1st brigade, 3rd division, Jiangsu Army. In 1917 he was transferred to be Chief of the Account Department, Military of Entering the War (參戰軍).

From 1921 Yin Tong successively held the positions of Chief of the Statistics Division in the Military Ministry, Head of the Zichuan (湽川) Mining Office, etc. In 1928 he was appointed Supervisor of Salt industry office, Hebei Province. On that time, he, Cheng Ke (程克), Yuan Liang (袁良) and Yin Rugeng (Yin Ju-keng) was regarded as "Four Prominent Figures" of Japan hand.

In May 1933 Yin Tong became a Chinese negotiator on the Tanggu Truce. In next month he was appointed advisor to the Beiping Political Affairs Readjustment Commission (駐平政務整理委員會) and member to the Requisitioning Committee on North Chinese Military Region. He became a brain to the Chairperson of the Readjustment Commission Huang Fu, and was in charge of negotiating with Japan. In October he was transferred to director of the Administrative bureau of Beining Railway (北寧鐵路). He successively held the positions of adviser and counselor of the Ministry for Railway.

In December 1937 Wang Kemin established the Provisional Government of the Republic of China, Yin Tong also participated in it. In next March he was appointed Governor to the General Office for Construction (建設總署督辦) of the same Government. In March 1940 the Wang Jingwei regime was established, he was appointed Executive member of the North China Political Council (華北政務委員會) and Member to the Central Political Committee of Kuomintang (Wang's Clique), etc. He also held the position of Governor to the General Office for Construction, the North China Political Council.

Yin Tong died from Uremia with Heart disease at Beijing on 30 December 1942.
