= Gao Zongwu =

Chinese diplomat (1905–1994)

- 高宗武
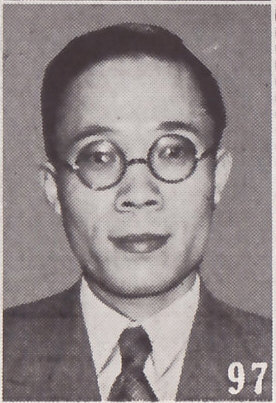
- Gao Zongwu as pictured in The Most Recent Biographies of Chinese Dignitaries
- Born: 1905
- Died: 1994 (aged 88–89); United States
- Education: Kyushu Imperial University
- Political party: Kuomintang
- Other political affiliations: Kuomintang (Wang Jingwei)

Gao Zongwu (Chinese: 高宗武; Wade–Giles: Kao Tsung-wu; 1905 – 1994) was a Chinese diplomat in the Republic of China during the Second Sino-Japanese War. He was best known for his key role in Sino-Japanese negotiations from 1937 to 1940, during which he served as Chiang Kai-shek's and later Wang Jingwei's pointman with Japan. Disillusioned with the harsh terms Japan imposed on Wang’s collaborationist regime, Gao and fellow diplomat Tao Xisheng defected in January 1940 and leaked the main terms of Wang’s negotiations with Japan to the press.

== Biography ==
=== Early life and career ===
Born around 1905, Gao Zongwu was educated in Japan at the Kyushu Imperial University. Described as being intelligent and a skilled politician, Gao suffered from chronic bouts of tuberculosis. He later returned to China to teach political science at Nanjing University and parts of his dissertation on Sino-Japanese diplomacy were published in Chinese magazines. These were read by Li Shengwu, an Oxford-educated scholar on international law and colleague of Wang Jingwei, who brought them to his attention. Wang met with Gao, being impressed with the young man's work, and invited him to join the government (Wang being the Chinese Minister of Foreign Affairs at the time). Gao rapidly rose through the ranks due to his abilities and became Chief of the Asia Bureau of the Foreign Ministry before he was thirty years old. Thus he became one of Wang's closest friends and supporters, entering the so-called "low-key club" of Chinese officials who wanted to establish peace with Japan after the Marco Polo Bridge Incident, despite the atmosphere of treason that surrounded those who supported a peace policy in the eyes of the public. He became one of the most prominent members of the group, along with Zhou Fohai. Gao also had extensive contacts among the Chinese banking community, a member of which he knew well through a mutual acquaintance, which helped advance his career.

Gao Zongwu spoke fluent Japanese and had served as Wang Jingwei's translator while the latter had been foreign minister.

=== Sino-Japanese peace talks ===
Gao would go on to play a major role in negotiations between Japan and the Chinese government throughout the next two years. Between the Marco Polo Bridge Incident in the summer of 1937 and the outbreak of the Battle of Shanghai by fall of that year, Gao met with both Wang and Chiang Kai-shek. He expressed his intent to establish a peace agreement with Japan and completely turn around Sino-Japanese relations. Wang agreed, and Chiang gave his approval. On 31 July 1937, Gao met with a banking contact and his acquaintance, Japanese businessman Nishi Yoshiaki, a protege of Matsuoka Yosuke, Japanese diplomat and former president of the South Manchurian Railway Company, who supported the peace movement. Shortly after the fall of Nanjing Gao resigned from his position in the Foreign Ministry and traveled to Hong Kong on what was ostensibly an intelligence gathering mission, but was really there at the behest of Zhou Fohai and the low-key club to make contacts with officials sympathetic to the peace movement. Zhou kept Chiang informed of their efforts the entire time.

In late 1937 Gao took a break to recuperate from a tuberculosis attack, and a friend of his from the Foreign Ministry continued his work, meeting with Nishi in January 1938 in Shanghai. It was through Nishi that Gao's friend arranged a visit to Tokyo on 15 February to begin conversations with pro-Chinese members of the Japanese leadership, the main one being Colonel Kagesa Sadaaki of the strategy section of the Army General Staff, along with Vice Chief of General Staff Hayao Tada. Through Gao's friend they passed a number of letters to Chiang Kai-shek describing their desire to negotiate a peace. After leaving Japan on 5 March, he met with Gao, Nishi, and the journalist Matsumoto Shigeharu—Gao's former professor at Kyushu University—in Hong Kong. Afterwards they headed to report their findings to Zhou, who passed on the letters to Chiang.

On 16 April Gao returned to Hong Kong and met with Nishi, telling him Chiang's positive reaction to the letters from Colonel Kagesa. He had also told Gao basic conditions for peace, including Japanese recognition of Chinese sovereignty, and later negotiations for the question of Manchukuo and Inner Mongolia. Nishi then departed to Japan on April 19 to see if a visit to Tokyo by Gao was possible, but returned with negative results as Kagesa was not willing to enter negotiations at the time. He returned from Japan with nothing more than vague assurances of support from some officers of the Army General Staff, which Gao reported to Chiang, much to the Chinese leader's outrage, who ordered Gao to cut off the talks. In March 1938, however, Gao met with Matsumoto, who encouraged him to undertake an unauthorized mission to Tokyo. Zhou Fohai supported the idea, offering to take responsibility for the trip. Gao arrived in Japan in early July.

During the diplomat's three-week stay in Tokyo he met with Takeru Inukai, an advisor to Prime Minister of Japan Prince Fumimaro Konoe, among others. It was unclear exactly how the name of Wang Jingwei came up but Gao, while emphasizing he did not intend to oppose Chiang, believed that negotiations could continue through Wang if Chiang was too unwilling to continue them. Gao passed the results of his mission on to Zhou after his return to Shanghai in mid-July but ended up being hospitalized again because of tuberculosis. Zhou reported the results of Gao's Tokyo trip to both Wang—who was opposed to the idea of betraying Chiang—and also the Chinese leader himself, who was more annoyed with it than anything else. However, Wang's attitude would change as 1938 went on and more Chinese civilians died as a result of the intensifying warfare, which Wang blamed on the Kuomintang's resistance policies. By the fall of 1938, Gao had arranged contact between another low-key club member, Mei Siping, and Matsumoto, who in turn connected him to Tokyo which assured Mei that the Japanese War Ministry was willing to have a more lenient China policy. The low-key club was further encouraged by Prince Konoe's radio address on 3 November 1938 that called for a "New Order in East Asia" to oppose Communism and Western imperialism, and that Japan would welcome China into it, even considering giving up demands for territorial and economic concessions.

From 12 November until 20 November, Gao, Mei Siping, and Zhou Longxiang went to Shanghai to take part in negotiations for Wang's eventual defection from the government of Chiang Kai-shek in Chongqing. They would sign a document known as the "Conference Proceedings" which would serve as the basic agreement of terms between the low-key club and the Imperial Japanese Army. On the Japanese side with Lieutenant Colonel Imai Takeo, head of "Operation Watanabe" (the Japanese code name for the dealings that led to Wang's defection), along with Colonel Kagesa and Takeru Inukai who flew in from Tokyo as the last details were worked out. Five important issues were discussed by Gao's team and the Japanese side—recognition of Manchukuo, Chinese indemnity payments to Japan, Japanese economic activities in China, Japanese extraterritoriality, and the withdrawal of IJA troops from China. Conflicting reports from participants arose over whether the Chinese side agreed to recognize Manchukuo or not. But they firmly rejected any indemnity payments. Gao and his group won concessions on economic affairs, agreeing to simply grant Japan permission to exploit the natural resources of north China and give it favored trade nation status. The Japanese also agreed to review their extraterritorial concessions in China. As for the troop withdrawal, they agreed that China and Japan would have a joint anti-Soviet defense force in Inner Mongolia and the Beijing–Tianjin corridor, while Japanese troops would leave the rest of China within two years.

The two groups also came to an agreement regarding the details of Wang's defection, and that he would not merely lead a peace movement but essentially a new collaborationist government (although Wang later made a contradictory claim to this in his deathbed testament in 1944, asserting that it was not their intent at the time to establish a regime opposing Chiang). According to Gao, the French ambassador to China Henri Cosme had some influence on Wang's decision to defect, who believed that China would be better off reaching a peace agreement as Japan was more powerful. They intended to set up this government in unoccupied China in order to emphasis Wang's independence and avoid the treasonous puppet status of the existing puppet regimes, the Provisional Government and Reformed Government of the Republic of China. They would rely on support from anti-Kuomintang regional warlords who distrusted Chiang, which they expected to join the Wang government, as well as major offensives by the IJA against the Nationalist Army.

Unbeknownst to Gao and the others at the time, the Japanese government had not taken a full role in overseeing the results of the conference in Shanghai but left the work to lower-ranking military officers. These were officials sympathetic to China but representing a minority in the Japanese leadership. This would have consequences later on when the Japanese higher leadership ultimately disagreed to use the terms reached at this conference. Meanwhile, the delegates also worked out a schedule for Wang's defection. Wang eventually escaped to Hanoi in French Indochina, but continued negotiations dragged out for months as Prince Konoe damaged the peace movement in a 22 December 1938 announcement that made clear his lack of commitment to the terms from the conference, bowing to pressure from the hardline faction of the General Staff. A much harsher policy towards China had been adopted by the military bureaucracy around that time, while Prince Konoe personally had no interest in supporting Wang in forming a new Chinese government. Konoe's successor as premier, Baron Hiranuma Kiichirō, also adopted a wait-and-see attitude in regards to the Wang Jingwei situation.

As the Wang group began leaving from Hanoi to Japan in April 1939 and had passed the point of no return after Wang's personal secretary was assassinated in a botched Kuomintang Blue Shirts hit, Gao Zongwu was becoming disillusioned and came to represent the anti-Japanese camp of the peace movement. The Japanese already started to dislike him due to his persistent attitude at the Shanghai conference to give the Wang regime as much independence and power as possible. He believed Wang was in danger of becoming a puppet. In May and June Wang made a visit to Tokyo to meet with high officials of the Japanese government, along with Zhou and Gao (who advised him against the meeting). During that time their Japanese hosts identified Gao as a "troublemaker" and sought to separate him from Wang as much as possible. Gao had come close to being poisoned while there, which did not improve his opinion of the Japanese.

However, the Wang movement had made progress in mid-1939 after the conclusion of the border clashes between Japan and the Soviets in Manchuria. When following the clashes Japan's ally Germany signed a non-aggression pact with the Soviet Union, the pro-Axis Hiranuma government fell, and it was replaced by Abe Nobuyuki's government, who was sympathetic to Wang. The Abe government agreed to pledge full support for Wang. In light of this, the IJA commands in China were reorganized into one unified command (the China Expeditionary Army) which ended Wang's quarrels with the leaders of existing puppet regimes and their Japanese advocates, allowing him to bring them under his authority. In November and December 1939 the Wang group negotiated with the Japanese authorities a different set of terms in which the Japanese went back on everything they promised in the previous Shanghai conference negotiated by Gao and Mei, relying on the harsher terms composed by the military bureaucracy, and by then Gao had become so disenchanted from the rest of the peace movement because of this Japanese betrayal that he abandoned Wang.

On New Year's Day in 1940, Gao Zongwu and one of his associates, Tao Xisheng, escaped with the assistance of the infamous Shanghai crime boss Du Yuesheng, who had contacted Chiang to let him know of Gao's intent to return. Chiang then had Nationalist intelligence chief General Dai Li help organize their defection. Gao, who had translated the treaty to Chinese for Wang, stole a copy of it with him. They arrived in Hong Kong on 5 January. They initially remained quiet but handed over the secret documents from Wang's negotiations with the Japanese to the Kuomintang news agency on 21 January. They then publicized the next day a telegram that accused Japan of trying to dismember China and urged Wang to reconsider his actions. This caused a shock in Wang's movement, enraging Zhou Fohai, for example. Wang's group responded that Gao was upset over his position (slated to be merely the vice foreign minister despite his critical role and diplomatic experience, while the foreign ministry portfolio instead went to a medical doctor by profession, Chu Minyi), and that the documents were fake. They were in fact copies of the initial proposals and not the final agreement, but many of their points had remained the same, and represented a major propaganda victory for Chiang Kai-shek's government as they destroyed the good name of Wang in the public perception.

=== Later life ===
Following his much-celebrated defection by the authorities in Chongqing, Gao was given a passport by Chiang and emigrated to the United States, where he lived the rest of his life until his death.

His memoirs were later published and have been an important source of information for historians on the Wang Jingwei peace movement.

== Sources ==
=== Books ===
- Boyle, John H. (1972). China and Japan at War, 1937-1945; The Politics of Collaboration. Stanford University Press. ISBN 0804708002.
- Henriot, Christian (2004). In the Shadow of the Rising Sun: Shanghai under Japanese Occupation. Cambridge University Press. ISBN 061889425X.
- Mitter, Rana (2013). Forgotten Ally: China's World War II, 1937-1945. Houghton Mifflin Harcourt. ISBN 978-0521822213.
