= Wu Zanzhou =

Republic of China politician (1885–1949)

Wu Zanzhou (simplified Chinese: 吴赞周; traditional Chinese: 吳贊周; pinyin: Wú Zànzhōu) (April 25, 1885 – October 2, 1949) was a military officer and politician in the Republic of China. He belonged to the Beijing Government and Zhili clique. In the end, he became an important politician in the Provisional Government of the Republic of China and the Wang Jingwei regime. He was born in Zhengding, Zhili (Hebei).

== Biography ==
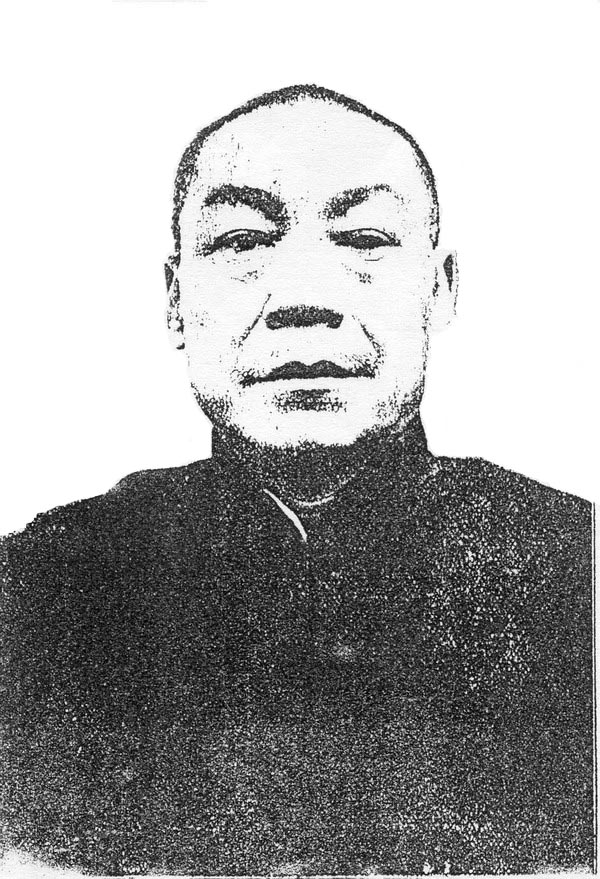
Wu Zanzhou

After graduating the Baoding Military Academy, Wu Zanzhou went to study in Japan. After returning to China, he belonged to the Zhili clique of General Sun Chuanfang. When Sun intercepted the National Revolutionary Army which engaged in Northern Expedition, Wu was appointed as the commander of the 6th Mixed Brigade of the 2nd Army, Anguojun (安國軍). In 1926, when Sun was defeated by the National Revolutionary Army, Wu escaped to Tianjin. Later he came back to his hometown.

In the era of the National Government, the National Revolutionary Army usually corrected taxes from Wu and occupied his house by several reasons, he held a grudge against them. In October 1937, Japanese Troops entered to Zhengding. At that time, Wu negotiated with Kiyoshi Katsuki who was the commander of the 1st Army of the Japanese Northern China Area Army and had been his schoolmate in Japan. Wu concluded a cease-fire agreement with Katsuki. Later Wu became the president of the Local Preservation Council in Zhengding, and cooperated with Japan.

In December of same year, Wang Kemin established the Provisional Government of the Republic of China, in which Wu also participated. The following February, the Local Preservation Council was reformed to the Government of County, and Wu was appointed as governor. That autumn, he was promoted to Governor of the Southern Hebei Area Government (冀南道尹公署道尹). In June 1939, when the Governor of Hebei Province Gao Lingwei resigned his post, Wu succeeded him.

In March 1940, when the Wang Jingwei regime was established, Wu stayed in his former position as a member of the North China Political Council. Until March 1943, he stayed on as governor of Hebei Province. After resigning as governor, he was appointed to be president of the Police High School, and was awarded the rank of lieutenant general. In 1945, he resigned his post, and became the president of the Tianjin Yongli Chemical Corporation (天津永利化學公司).

After the Wang Jingwei regime collapsed, Wu was arrested by Chiang Kai-shek's National Government, although it did not try his case. After the People's Liberation Army occupied the Beiping, he was put on trial in the People's Court. Because of the charge of treason and surrender to the enemy (namely Hanjian), he was sentenced to life imprisonment.

He died in prison of cancer on October 2, 1949.

== Alma mater ==
Baoding Military Academy
