= Wen Shizhen =

Wen Shizhen may refer to:

- Wen Shizhen (born 1877) (1877–1951), politician and diplomat in the Republic of China
- Wen Shizhen (born 1940) (1940–2021), Chinese Communist Party politician from Liaoning
