= Xu Xiuzhi =

Chinese politician

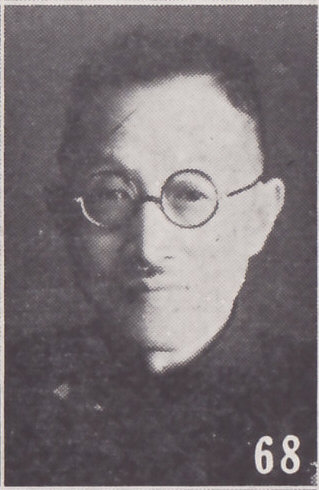
Xu Xiuzhi as pictured in The Most Recent Biographies of Chinese Dignitaries

Xu Xiuzhi (simplified Chinese: 许修直; traditional Chinese: 許修直; pinyin: Xǔ Xiūzhí; Wade–Giles: Hsü Hsiu-chi; 1880–1954) was a politician in the Republic of China. He belonged to Beijing Government and National Government. Later he participated in the Provisional Government of the Republic of China, the Reformed Government of the Republic of China and the Wang Jingwei regime (Republic of China-Nanjing). His former name was Zhuoran (卓然) and his courtesy name was Xixi (西溪). He was born in Wuxi, Jiangsu.

== Life and career ==
Xu Xiuzhi went to study to in Japan, and graduated from the Department of Law, Chuo University. After he returned to China, he successively held the post of Local Judicial Officer in Jiangsu and Zhejiang. In the end, he became the judge of the Daliyuan (大理院). In November 1924, Xu Xiuzhi was appointed to the Director of the Cast Mark Bureau by Prime Minister Huang Fu. After that, Xu became Huang's confidant.

In 1927, Xu Xiuzhi participated in National Government, and was appointed to the Chief of the Office of Legislation, Shanghai City. In October, he transferred to the chief secretary of the Ministry of Traffic. In 1933, he was appointed to the member of the Arranging Committee on Political Affairs to Beiping (駐平政務整理委員會), and was in charge of negotiating with Japan. In July 1935, he was promoted to Executive Vice-Minister for Interior by the Minister for Interior Huang Fu. Next February, Huang Fu resigned his post due to disease. Xu also withdrew from his post.

After the Second Sino-Japanese War broke out in December 1937, Xu Xiuzhi became the chief of the division of the public welfare, Xinminhui (新民會). Next January, he was appointed to the chief of the office of the Research, the Executive Committee, the collaborationist Provisional Government of the Republic of China. In May 1938, he was appointed to the Ministry for Judicial Administrating, Executive Yuan, the Reformed Government of the Republic of China. But he did not really take office at this post. On July, he became the Vice-president of the Northern Chinese Telegraph and Telephone Company, and also held the director of the Association for Overseas Chinese in Beijing. After 1939, the whereabouts of Xu were not so clear, but in February 1945, he was appointed to be Mayor of the Peking Special City of the Wang Jingwei regime.

After the Wang Jingwei regime had collapsed, the whereabouts of Xu Xiuzhi were mostly unknown. He died at Beijing in 1954.

== Alma mater ==
Chuo University

== Footnotes ==
- Xu Youchun (徐友春) (main ed.) (2007). Unabridged Biographical Dictionary of the Republic, Revised and Enlarged Version (民国人物大辞典 增订版). Hebei People's Press (Hebei Renmin Chubanshe; 河北人民出版社). ISBN 978-7-202-03014-1.
- Liu Shoulin (刘寿林) (etc.ed.) (1995). The Chronological Table of the Republic's Officer (民国职官年表). Zhonghua Book Company. ISBN 7-101-01320-1.
- The Biographies of Most Recent Chinese Important People (最新支那要人伝). Asahi Shimbun. 1941.
