= Wen Shizhen (politician, born 1877) =

Republic of China politician

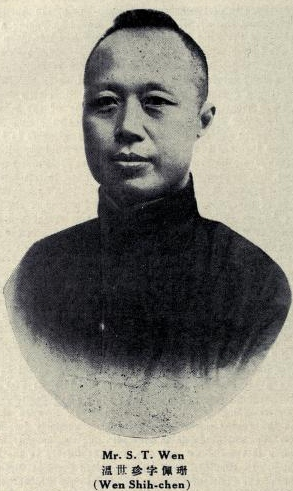
Wen Shizhen (Who's Who in China 3rd ed., 1925)

Wen Shizhen (simplified Chinese: 温世珍; traditional Chinese: 溫世珍; pinyin: Wēn Shìzhēn; Wade–Giles: Wen Shih-chen; 1877–1951), also known as S. T. Wen, was a politician and diplomat in the Republic of China. He was Mayor of Tianjin during the Provisional Government of the Republic of China and the Wang Jingwei regime (Republic of China-Nanjing). His courtesy name was Peishan (佩珊). He was born in Tianjin.

== Beijing government ==
Wen Shizhen graduated from the Beiyang Naval College (北洋水師學堂) in 1898. He served for 4 years in the Chinese Navy as a lieutenant while he went to the United Kingdom for training. Later he transferred to the staff of Li Hongzhang. In 1906 he was appointed a secretary for foreign affairs to the Viceroy of Liangguang.

In 1913 Wen Shizhen was appointed advisor in foreign affairs to the Military Governor (Dudu; 都督) Zhejiang. In 1916 he was given an additional post as High Diplomatic Advisor to the Military Governor Jiangxi Li Chun (李純). In August 1917 Li Chun became Military Governor Jiangsu; Wen accompanied him. In October 1920 he was appointed Superintendent of Customs of Nanjing. The next month he became concurrently Commissioner of Foreign Affairs in Nanjing. The next year he became a member of the Chinese Delegation to the Washington Naval Conference as the honorary councilor.

In 1923 Wen Shizhen was treated as an ambassador extraordinary and plenipotentiary. With the Zhili clique's support, Wen was appointed Commissioner of Foreign Affairs and concurrently Superintendent of Customs of Shanghai in September 1924. That year the Zhili clique was beaten by the Fengtian clique in the Second Zhili–Fengtian War, and Wen was invited by the Fengtian clique's Military Governor Yang Yuting. Later the National Revolutionary Army occupied Shanghai, so Wen defected to Japan, and retired from political life for a while.

== Collaboration with Japan ==
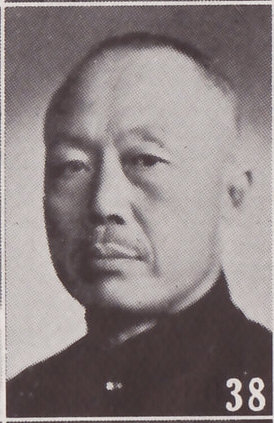
Wen Shizhen as pictured in The Most Recent Biographies of Chinese Dignitaries

In December 1937, Wang Kemin established the Provisional Government of the Republic of China. Wen also participated in it, and was appointed Superintendent of Customs of Tianjin, Inspector of the Bank of Hebei Province, and Chairperson of the Arranging Commission for tariffs, etc.

At that time Pan Yugui (潘毓桂) was appointed Mayor of Tianjin Special City. However, his birthplace was not Tianjin, so the leading figures of Tianjin and the Japanese Special Service Agency of Tianjin did not want to support him. While Wen Shizhen was born in Tianjin, his work was better than Pan's, so he won support with people in the political circle. Pan and Wen struggled with each other; in 1939, Pan resigned his post and Wen became the mayor. In March 1940, the Wang Jingwei regime was established, while Wen stayed at his post. In February 1943 he resigned Mayor.

After the surrender of Japan at the end of World War II, Wen was arrested by Chiang Kai-shek's National Government, and because of the charge of treason and surrender to the enemy (namely Hanjian), he was sentenced to death. However, Wen was not executed while he was imprisoned in Tianjin. At the end of 1948, because the People's Liberation Army's entering Tianjin was coming, Wen was released by the Kuomintang authority. The following January he was rearrested by the Tianjin People's Government of the Chinese Communist Party.

Wen Shizhen was executed by the People's Republic of China in 1951.

== Alma mater ==
Beiyang Naval College

== Footnotes ==
- Xu Youchun (徐友春) (main ed.) (2007). Unabridged Biographical Dictionary of the Republic, Revised and Enlarged Version (民国人物大辞典 增订版). Hebei People's Press (Hebei Renmin Chubanshe; 河北人民出版社). ISBN 978-7-202-03014-1.
- Who's Who in China 3rd ed. (中國名人錄 第三版). The China Weekly Review (Shanghai) (上海密勒氏評論報). 1925.
- The Before and After of Pan Yugui was appointed to the Fake Mayor of Tianjin (潘毓桂出任天津伪市长的前前后后) Archived 2011-07-07 at the Wayback Machine The Official Website of Hebei Ward, Tianjin (天津市河北区政务网)
- Liu Shoulin (刘寿林) (etc.ed.) (1995). The Chronological Table of the Republic's Officer (民国职官年表). Zhonghua Book Company. ISBN 7-101-01320-1.
- Committee for Problems of East Asia (東亜問題調査会) (1941). The Biographies of Most Recent Chinese Important People (最新支那要人伝). Asahi Shimbun.
