= Yue Kaixian =

Chinese politician (1883-?)

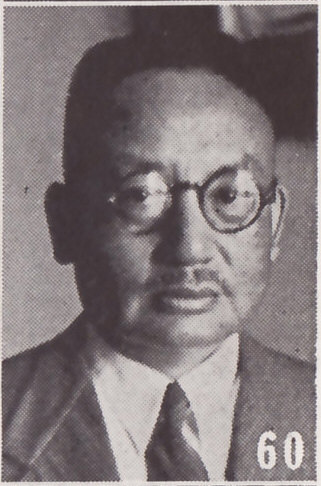
Yue Kaixian as pictured in The Most Recent Biographies of Chinese Dignitaries

Yue Kaixian (traditional Chinese: 岳開先; simplified Chinese: 岳开先; pinyin: Yuè Kāixiān; Wade-Giles: Yue K'ai-hsien; born 1883) was a politician in the Republic of China. Another art-name was Pijiang (闢疆). He was born in Chengdu, Sichuan.

== Biography ==
Yue Kaixian claimed that he was descended from Yue Fei who was a hero in Southern Song dynasty. From 1933 until February 1936, Yue Kaixian worked as the Foreign Ministry's Special Negotiator to Chahar (at that time, the Chairperson of Chahar was Song Zheyuan).

Later Yue Kaixian participated in the Provisional Government of the Republic of China. In January 1939 he was appointed Director to the Foreign Affairs Bureau of the Administrative Council of the same Government. In March 1940 the Wang Jingwei regime was established, he was appointed Chief to the General Office for Business (實業總署署長) which post he held until November 1943.

After that the whereabouts of Yue Kaixian were unknown.

== Footnotes ==
- Liu Shoulin (刘寿林) (etc.ed.) (1995). The Chronological Table of the Republic's Officer (民国职官年表). Zhonghua Book Company. ISBN 7-101-01320-1.
- Intelligence Department of Ministry for Foreign Affairs, Japan (外務省情報部） (1928). The Directory of Current Chineser, revised edition (現代支那人名鑑 改訂). Researching and Compilation Department of Toua Doubunkai (東亜同文会調査編纂部).
