= Xu Liang =

Chinese diplomat and politician (1893-1951)

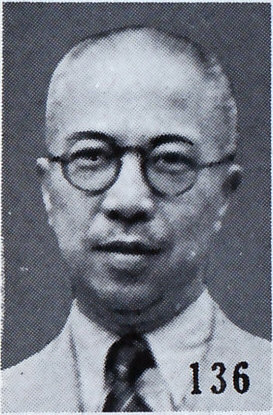
- Xu Liang as pictured in The Most Recent Biographies of Chinese Dignitaries

Chinese name
- Traditional Chinese: 徐良
Transcriptions
Standard Mandarin
- Wade–Giles: Hsu Liang
Yue: Cantonese
- Jyutping: Ceoi^{4} Loeng^{4}

Xu Liang (Note: Chinese: 徐良; pinyin: Xú Liáng; Wade–Giles: Hsu Liang; Jyutping: Ceoi^{4} Loeng^{4}) (1893–1951) was a diplomat and politician in the Republic of China. He was an important politician during the pro-Japanese collaborationist Nanjing Nationalist Government, serving as the Minister of Foreign Affairs and the ambassador to Japan. His courtesy name was Shanbo (善伯; pinyin: Shàn bó; Jyutping: Sin^{6} Baak^{3}). He was born in Sanshui, Guangdong.

== Biography ==
Xu Liang went to Japan, and entered to Yokohama Daidou School (横浜大同学校). He then went to the United States, where he graduated from Columbia University and Washington University (from which "Washington University" he graduated is uncertain). Later, Xu Liang returned to China and was appointed a secretary to the Ministry for Justice, Ministry for Foreign Affairs, and the Interior Ministry. Afterwards he successively held the positions of secretary or advisor to many Local Governments or Legations. In the Nationalist Government era, he became a member of the Legation staff to the United States and an officer in the Ministry for Foreign Affairs.

When the Wang Jingwei regime was established in March 1940, Xu Liang also participated in it. He was appointed Vice-Minister for Foreign Affairs and Chief of the Central Political Committee's Commission for Foreign Affairs, etc. In October 1940 he was appointed Ambassador to Japan, and sent to Manchukuo as a special envoy. That December he returned to Nanjing and was promoted to Minister of Foreign Affairs, a post which he held until October 1941. Later he was appointed member of the North China Political Council (華北政務委員會) and member of the National Government.

After the Wang Jingwei regime had collapsed, Xu Liang was arrested by Chiang Kai-shek's government. He was convicted of treason and surrender to the enemy (namely Hanjian) and sentenced to death. But Xu wasn't executed, while being imprisoned in Tianjin. In the end of 1948, as the Communist army approached Tianjin, he was released by the Nationalist authorities. The following January he was once again arrested by the Communist authorities in Tianjin.

In July 1951 Xu Liang was sentenced to death by the Tianjin authorities and executed at Ningjin County, Hebei in the same year.

== Notes ==
Government offices
Preceded by Chu Minyi	Minister of Foreign Affairs (Wang Jingwei Government); December 1940 – October 1941	Succeeded by Chu Minyi
