= Wang Yintai =

Chinese politician

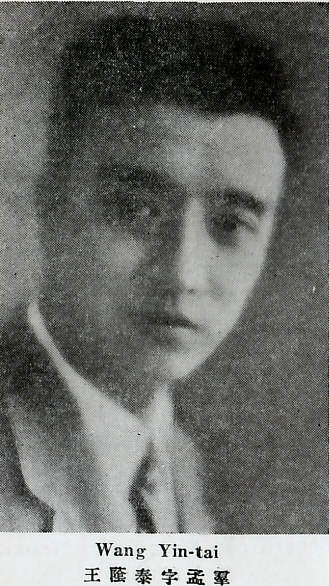
Wang Yintai (Who's Who in China 4th ed., 1931)

Wang Yintai (traditional Chinese: 王蔭泰; simplified Chinese: 王荫泰; pinyin: Wáng Yìntài, Wade-Giles: Wang Yin-t'ai) (1886 - December 15, 1961) was a politician in the Republic of China. He belonged to Fengtian clique, later he became an important politician during the Provisional Government of the Republic of China and the Wang Jingwei regime (Republic of China-Nanjing). He was born in Fenyang, Shanxi, and original place was Shaoxing, Zhejiang. His father was a politician and scholar, Wang Shitong (王式通).

== Biography ==
=== In the Beijing Government ===
Wang Yintai went to Japan where he graduated the 1st High School (ja:第一高等学校 (旧制)) in 1906. Next, he went to Germany where he graduated Department of Law, University of Berlin in 1912. In next year he returned to China, belonged to the Beijing Government, and successively held the positions of lecturer of the Department of Law to the Peking University and bench of the High Public Prosecutor, etc.

In 1919 Wang Yintai was appointed Legal adviser to the Office for the Custody of Enemy Property (敵國財產管理處法律顧問) and the Special Agent (特派員) to Kulun (庫倫; Ulan Bator), Outer Mongolia. In next Year he transferred to Director of General Affairs Department, Kulun Pacification Agency (庫倫宣撫署). In 1921 he went to Northeast, and became a legal adviser for Zhang Zuolin. In 1926 he was appointed Vice-Minister for Foreign Affairs, and served concurrently as a delegate plenipotentiary to the Chinese Tariff Revision Conference, Chairman of the Sino-Russian Conference Commission.

In 1927 Pan Fu(潘復)'s Cabinet was formed, Wang Yintai was appointed Minister for Foreign Affairs. And Wang also held vice-president of Research Society for Treaty and the General Manager of the China Financial Bank (中華匯業銀行總經理). In February 1928 he transferred to Minister for Justice, namely the final Minister for Justice in Beijing Government. In June Beijing Government had collapsed, Wang escaped to Northeast. Later he went to Shanghai and was an established lawyer.

=== In the Provisional Government and the Wang Jingwei regime ===
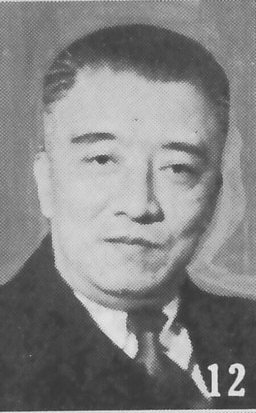
Wang Yintai as pictured in The Most Recent Biographies of Chinese Dignitaries

In December 1937 Wang Kemin established the Provisional Government of the Republic of China, Wang Yintai also participated in it, and was appointed Minister for Business. In March 1940 the Wang Jingwei regime was established, Wang Yintai transferred to Governor of the General Office for Business (實業總署督辦), the North China Political Council (華北政務委員會). On that time, he also held the position of Executive Member of the same Council. In November 1943 he was appointed Governor of the General Office for Agriculture and Chief to the Agency for General Affairs in the same Council. In February 1945 he was promoted to be Chairperson of the North China Political Council.

After the Wang Jingwei regime collapsed, Wang Yintai was arrested by Chiang Kai-shek's National Government of the Republic of China at Beiping in December 1945. In next October 8, because of the charge of treason and surrender to enemy (namely Hanjian), he was sentenced to death on Nanjing High Court. He appealed to the Supreme Court, he was commuted to life imprisonment in December 1947. He was imprisoned in Shanghai. After the People's Republic of China was established, his treatment wasn't changed.

Wang Yintai died in prison on December 15, 1961.

== Alma mater ==
Humboldt University of Berlin

== Footnotes ==
- Xu Youchun (徐友春) (main ed.) (2007). Unabridged Biographical Dictionary of the Republic, Revised and Enlarged Version (民国人物大辞典 增订版). Hebei People's Press (Hebei Renmin Chubanshe; 河北人民出版社). ISBN 978-7-202-03014-1.
- Who's Who in China 5th ed. (中國名人錄 第五版). The China Weekly Review (Shanghai) (上海密勒氏評論報). 1936.
- Yu Zidao (余子道) (etc.) (2006). The Complete History of Wang's Fake Regime (汪伪政权全史). Shanghai People's Press (Shanghai Renmin Chubanshe; 上海人民出版社). ISBN 7-208-06486-5.
- History of Prison in Shanghai (上海监狱志), The Office of Shanghai's History (上海地方志办公室) Website
- Liu Shoulin (刘寿林) (etc.ed.) (1995). The Chronological Table of the Republic's Officer (民国职官年表). Zhonghua Book Company. ISBN 7-101-01320-1.
- Committee for Problems of East Asia (東亜問題調査会） (1941). The Biographies of Most Recent Chinese Important People (最新支那要人伝). Asahi Shimbun.
