= Chang Yin-wu =

Chinese politician

- 張蔭梧
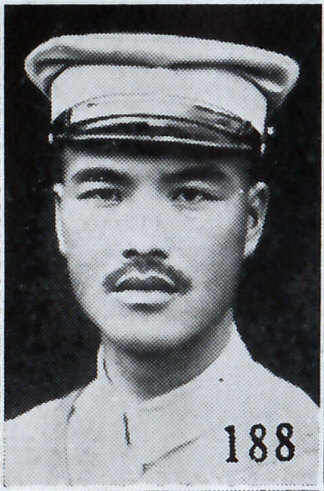
- Chang Yin-wu as pictured in The Most Recent Biographies of Chinese Dignitaries

Personal details
- Born: 1891 Pao-ting (now Baoding), Chih-li (now Hebei), Qing dynasty
- Died: 27 May 1949 (aged 57–58) Beiping, People's Republic of China
- Party: Kuomintang
- Occupation: Politician

Chang Yin-wu
- Traditional Chinese: 張蔭梧
- Simplified Chinese: 张荫梧
Transcriptions
Standard Mandarin
- Hanyu Pinyin: Zhāng Yìnwú
- Wade–Giles: Chang1 Yin4-wu2

Chang Yin-wu (Chinese: 張蔭梧; pinyin: Zhāng Yìnwú); 1891 – May 27, 1949), or Chang Yen-wu, was a Kuomintang educator and politician of the Republic of China. He was born in Baoding, Hebei. He was a graduate of the Baoding Military Academy. He was the 17th Republican mayor of Peiping (now Beijing). After the capture of Beijing by the forces of the Chinese Communist Party, he was arrested by the People's Liberation Army in February 1949 and jailed. He died three months later in prison.

Preceded by He Qigong	Mayor of Beijing; 1929–1931	Succeeded by Wang Tao

== Bibliography ==
- 徐友春主編 (2007). 民国人物大辞典 増訂版|和書. 河北人民出版社. ISBN 978-7-202-03014-1.
- 劉国銘主編 (2005). 中国国民党百年人物全書|和書. 団結出版社. ISBN 7-80214-039-0.
- 東亜問題調査会 (1941). 最新支那要人伝|和書. Asahi Shimbun Company.
- 劉寿林ほか編 (1995). 民国職官年表|和書. Zhonghua Book Company. ISBN 7-101-01320-1.
