= He Peirong =

Chinese politician

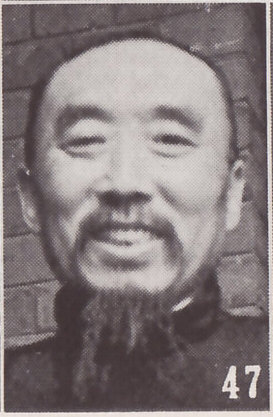
He Peirong as pictured in The Most Recent Biographies of Chinese Dignitaries

He Peirong (Chinese: 何佩瑢; pinyin: Hé Pèiróng; 1880 – June 6, 1942) was a military personnel and politician in the Republic of China. He belonged to the Beijing Government, Anhui clique. In the end, he was an important politician during the Reformed Government of the Republic of China and the Wang Jingwei regime (Republic of China-Nanjing). His courtesy name was Yunshan (韵珊). He was born in Jianshi, Hubei.

== Biography ==
In 1906 He Peirong went to Japan where he graduated Department of the Infantry in the 4th period, the Imperial Japanese Army Academy. Later he returned to China, he was appointed an instructor of the Baoding Military Academy.

In 1912 the Republic of China was established, He Peirong was appointed Chief of Staff to the 2nd Division of the Beijing Army. He belonged to the Anhui clique. In February 1917 he became Chief to the Political Affairs Agency of Hubei Province. In next August he also held the position of Chief of the Financial Agency.

In March 1919 He Peirong was appointed acting Governor Hubei, and on November, he was promoted to be real Governor. But in next August Anhui clique was defeated by Zhili clique on Zhili–Anhui War, so he also resigned his post. He was transferred to Councilor to the office for Military Governor Hubei and Director to the Mining Bureau of the Hubei. From 1928 he didn't get any political or military position in the National Government.

In 1937, after breaking out the Second Sino-Japanese War, He Peirong was appointed Chief to the House of Councilors and chairperson to the Political Council in Wuhan. In October 1938 Wuhan was occupied by Japanese Troops, He was appointed President of the Local Preservation Council of Wuhan by Japanese. In next April he was appointed chairperson to the House of Councilors of Wuhan City, the Reformed Government of the Republic of China. In same November he was promoted to be Governor Hubei.

In March 1940 the Wang Jingwei regime was established, while He Peirong kept his former position. In same May he organized the local party which named Republican Party (Gonghedang; 共和黨). In October Hubei Provincial Government was reformed and was changed to the committee system, while he was also appointed Chairperson of Hubei. In December he dissolved the Republican Party, then he entered to the Kuomintang (Wang's clique) and was appointed Central Executive Member of it. In next May he also held the positions of executive director and Chief-secretary to the Hubei branch of Chinese General Assembly, the League of Eastern Asia. In June he also held the position of Commander of the Security Forces of Hubei.

He Peirong was poisoned by Japanese Troops at Hankou Special City on June 6, 1942.

== Alma mater ==
Imperial Japanese Army Academy

=== Awards and decorations ===
- Order of the Precious Brilliant Golden Grain
- Order of Wen-Hu
- Star of the Order of the Sacred Treasure
- Order of Rank and Merit 6th class

== Footnotes ==
- Xu Youchun (徐友春) (main ed.) (2007). Unabridged Biographical Dictionary of the Republic, Revised and Enlarged Version (民国人物大辞典 增订版). Hebei People's Press (Hebei Renmin Chubanshe; 河北人民出版社). ISBN 978-7-202-03014-1.
- Zheng Renjia (鄭仁佳), "The biographical sketch of He Peirong" (何佩瑢小傳)Biographical Writings (傳記文學) Website (need Traditional Chinese font)
- Liu Shoulin (刘寿林) (etc.ed.) (1995). The Chronological Table of the Republic's Officer (民国职官年表). Zhonghua Book Company. ISBN 7-101-01320-1.
- Committee for Problems of East Asia (東亜問題調査会） (1941). The Biographies of Most Recent Chinese Important People (最新支那要人伝). Asahi Shimbun.
