= Zhu Shen =

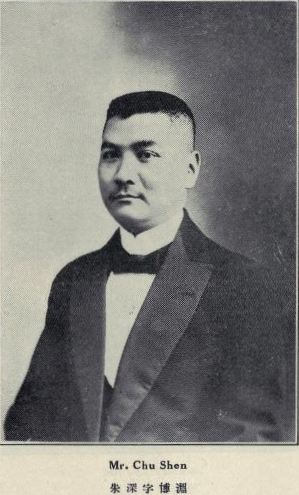
Zhu Shen (Who's Who in China 3rd ed., 1925)

Zhu Shen (Chinese: 朱深; pinyin: Zhū Shēn; Wade–Giles: Chu Shen; 1879 – July 2, 1943) was a politician and public prosecutor in the Republic of China. He was an important politician during the Provisional Government of the Republic of China and the Wang Jingwei regime. His courtesy name was Boyuan (博淵). He was born in Yongqing, Zhili (Hebei).

== Biography ==
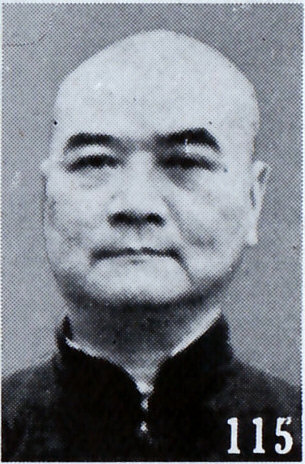
Zhu Shen as pictured in The Most Recent Biographies of Chinese Dignitaries

Zhu Shen went to Japan and studied law in Tokyo Imperial University where he graduated with the degree of L. L. B. Later he returned to China, in August 1912 he was appointed Acting Chief Procurator of the Local Procuratorate in Peking. In November 1913, he was appointed Chief Procurator the Metropolitan High Procuratorate. In November 1915, he promoted to be chief of the Chief Procuratorate.

In March 1918, Zhu Shen was appointed Minister for Justice of the Duan Qirui Cabinet. In next June he was concurrently appointed Minister for Interior upon the resignation of Qian Nengxun (錢能訓) from the Ministry and the Premiership. In December he was relieved of the concurrent post. He was a strong supporter of the Anhui clique.

In July 1920, Anhui Clique was beaten by Zhili clique in the Zhili–Anhui War, Zhu Shen was also placed on the wanted-list, so he escaped to Tianjin. He was pardoned in December 1923. In 1925 he was appointed Manager of the Capital under the Provisional Chief Executive (臨時執政), Duan Qirui. But in next year he resigned his post, and went into the business circle.

In December 1937, Wang Kemin established the Provisional Government of the Republic of China, Zhu Shen also participated in it. Zhu was appointed Minister for Justice. In 1939 he also held President of the Power Company in Northern China. In March 1940 the Wang Jingwei Regime was established, Zhu Shen was appointed Executive Member and Chief of the Agency for Political Affairs of the North China Political Council (華北政務委員會), etc. In February 1943 he was promoted to be Chairperson of the North China Political Council.

Zhu Shen died of illness at Beijing on July 2, 1943.

== Footnotes ==
- Zheng Renjia (鄭仁佳), "The Biographical Sketch of Zhu Shen" (朱深小傳)Biographical Writings (傳記文學) Website (need Traditional Chinese font)
- Xu Youchun (徐友春) (main ed.) (2007). Unabridged Biographical Dictionary of the Republic, Revised and Enlarged Version (民国人物大辞典 增订版). Hebei People's Press (Hebei Renmin Chubanshe; 河北人民出版社). ISBN 978-7-202-03014-1.
- Who's Who in China 3rd ed. (中國名人錄 第三版). The China Weekly Review (Shanghai) (上海密勒氏評論報). 1925.
- Who's Who in China 5th ed. (中國名人錄 第五版). The China Weekly Review (Shanghai) (上海密勒氏評論報). 1936.
- Liu Shoulin (刘寿林) (etc.ed.) (1995). The Chronological Table of the Republic's Officer (民国职官年表). Zhonghua Book Company. ISBN 7-101-01320-1.
- Committee for Problems of East Asia (東亜問題調査会） (1941). The Biographies of Most Recent Chinese Important People (最新支那要人伝). Asahi Shimbun.
