= Gao Lingwei =

Chinese politician (1870-1940)

Gao Lingwei 高凌霨
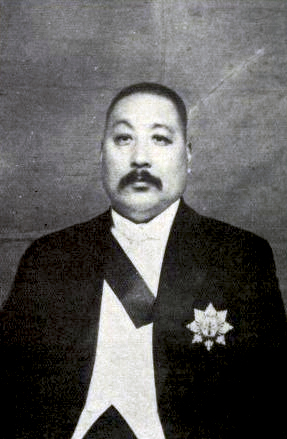

Acting President of China
- In office 14 June 1923 – 10 October 1923
- Premier: Himself (acting)
- Preceded by: Li Yuanhong
- Succeeded by: Cao Kun

Acting Premier of China
- In office 14 June 1923 – 12 January 1924
- President: Himself (acting); Cao Kun
- Preceded by: Zhang Shaozeng
- Succeeded by: Sun Baoqi

Personal details
- Born: September 12, 1870 Tianjin, Qing China
- Died: March 4, 1940 (aged 69) Beijing, China
- Party: Non-partisan
- Awards: Order of the Precious Brilliant Golden Grain

Gao Lingwei (Chinese: 高凌霨; pinyin: Gāo Língwèi; Wade–Giles: Kao Ling-wei; Hepburn: Kō Ryōi); (September 12, 1870 – March 4, 1940) was a Chinese politician during the late Qing dynasty and the early Republic of China.

A Tianjin native, he was appointed to Hubei where he held many offices relating to finance and education including a stint as superintendent of the provincial military academy. There he became a protégé of Zhang Zhidong in China's modernization effort and was appointed governor of Hunan. After the Xinhai Revolution, he returned to Tianjin and subsequently became a minister in many Warlord era cabinets. In 1923, he became the Acting President while Cao Kun "campaigned" for the presidency by bribing the National Assembly. Finally, he served briefly as Cao's first premier.

== Biography ==
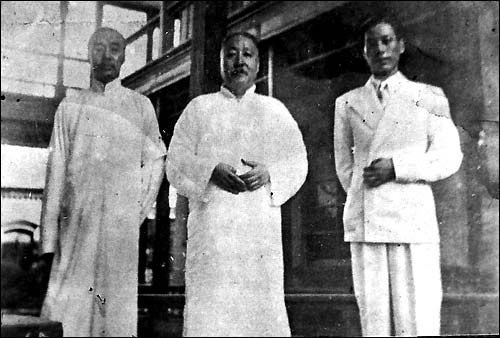
Gao Lingwei (Middle)

=== Early career ===
Gao Lingwei was born in Tianjin in 1868. He successfully passed the Imperial examinations and was afterwards assigned to the province of Hubei for official appointment. He was the sub-director of the high school attached to Chin Hsin College, and superintendent of the Military Academy in Hubei. Later, he became the director of the Hubei Government Mint. While holding the position of Viceroy of Hunan and Hubei, Zhang Zhidong ordered the establishment of an arsenal, industrial plants and copper and silver mints, and also encouraged the establishment of schools in his territory. Gao Lingwei participated in all these activities to the satisfaction of the Great Viceroy. In 1906, he was promoted to be the Commissioner of Education in Hubei. It was at a time when the Central Government tried to concentrate power in Beijing and local finances were consequently stringent and funds for education became very scant. Despite such circumstances Gao Lingwei found the necessary funds was able to increase the number of schools in that province by tenfold in a few months. In 1909 Gao Lingwei was promoted to be the Provincial Treasurer, a very high provincial appointment at that time. After serving in that important capacity for some time, one of his parents died, and according to the ancient custom, he had to retire from official duties for three years.

=== Warlord era politician ===
When the Xinhai Revolution came in 1911, Gao Lingwei went to Tianjin and continued living in retirement. During his retirement in Tianjin, at the request of his friends, he did all he could to direct the organization of banks along modern lines in different parts of the country. In August 1913 he was appointed the acting chief of the Financial Bureau of Zhili Province. In September 1913 he was ordered to act concurrently as Chief of the Preparation Bureau for the Collection of National Taxes in Zhili. He was relieved of these two posts in April 1914. In 1915 Gao Lingwei was the High Advisor to the Office of the Tuchun of the Three Eastern Provinces. In August 1917, he became a member of the Legislative Yuan from Zhili. In August 1920, he was appointed as the Vice-Minister of Agriculture and Commerce. In January 1921 he received the Second Class Tashou Chiaho. In July 1921 he was appointed as the vice-president of the Bank of Agriculture and Commerce. In October 1921 he was appointed as the Minister of Finance and awarded the First Class Tashou Chiaho. In November 1921 he was ordered to become the concurrently Director General of the Currency Bureau and also the Director General of the Salt Administration. In December 1921, he was transferred to become the Minister of the Interior. In this capacity he served in January 1922 the following concurrent positions: Director-General of Famine Relief; Director General of the Metropolitan Municipal Administration; and President of the Yangtze River Commission. In March 1922 Gao Lingwei was awarded the First Class Wenfu. In May 1922 he was ordered to act concurrently as Minister of Communications. This acting post was only held by him for half a month. In June 1922 Gao Lingwei was relieved of the portfolio of the Interior Ministry. On the 18th of the same month he was appointed to be the Civil Governor of Zhili, but he did not assume office and on the 24th he was relieved of the post of governor. In August 1922 he was appointed as the Acting Minister of Finance, in September he was transferred to become the Acting Minister of Agriculture and Commerce. In October 1922 Gao Lingwei was awarded the First Class Tashou Paokuang Chiaho. In November 1922 he was transferred to be the Acting Minister of the Interior. In January 1923 he was appointed as the Minister of the Interior. In February he was ordered to hold concurrently the Presidency of the Yangtze River Commission. In October 1923 Gao Lingwei was appointed Premier of China. He held this position until January 1924, when he was appointed to be the Director General of the Customs Administration to succeed Sun Baoqi, who had been appointed as the Premier. However, in October 1924, the armies of the warlord Feng Yuxiang overthrew President Cao Kun, and Gao Lingwei fled to Tianjin, and from there to Shanghai.

=== Later career ===
In 1926, Gao Lingwei returned from Shanghai to Tianjin, where he lived at the Japanese concession. He came into contact there with Duan Qirui, Wang Yitang and Zhang Yanqing, the future foreign minister of Manchukuo) and was active in promoting Sino-Japanese relations. He began cooperating with the Japanese secret services from 1930. In 1935, Gao Lingwei was made a member of the Hebei-Chahar Political Council. After the start of the Second Sino-Japanese War, he joined the pro-Japanese Provisional Government of the Republic of China led by Wang Kemin, who appointed him acting Mayor of Tianjin. From December 17, 1937, he was appointed governor of Hebei province. However, he resigned his post in May 1938 and moved to Beijing, where he died of a heart attack in 1940.

Political offices
Preceded by Li Yuanhong	President of China; 1923	Succeeded by Cao Kun
Preceded by Zhang Shaozeng	Premier of China; 1923–1924	Succeeded by Sun Baoqi
Preceded by office established	Mayor of Tianjin; 1937–1938	Succeeded by Pan Yugui
Preceded by office established	Governor of Hebei; 1938–1939	Succeeded by Wu Zanzhou
