= Zhou Longxiang =

Chinese politician

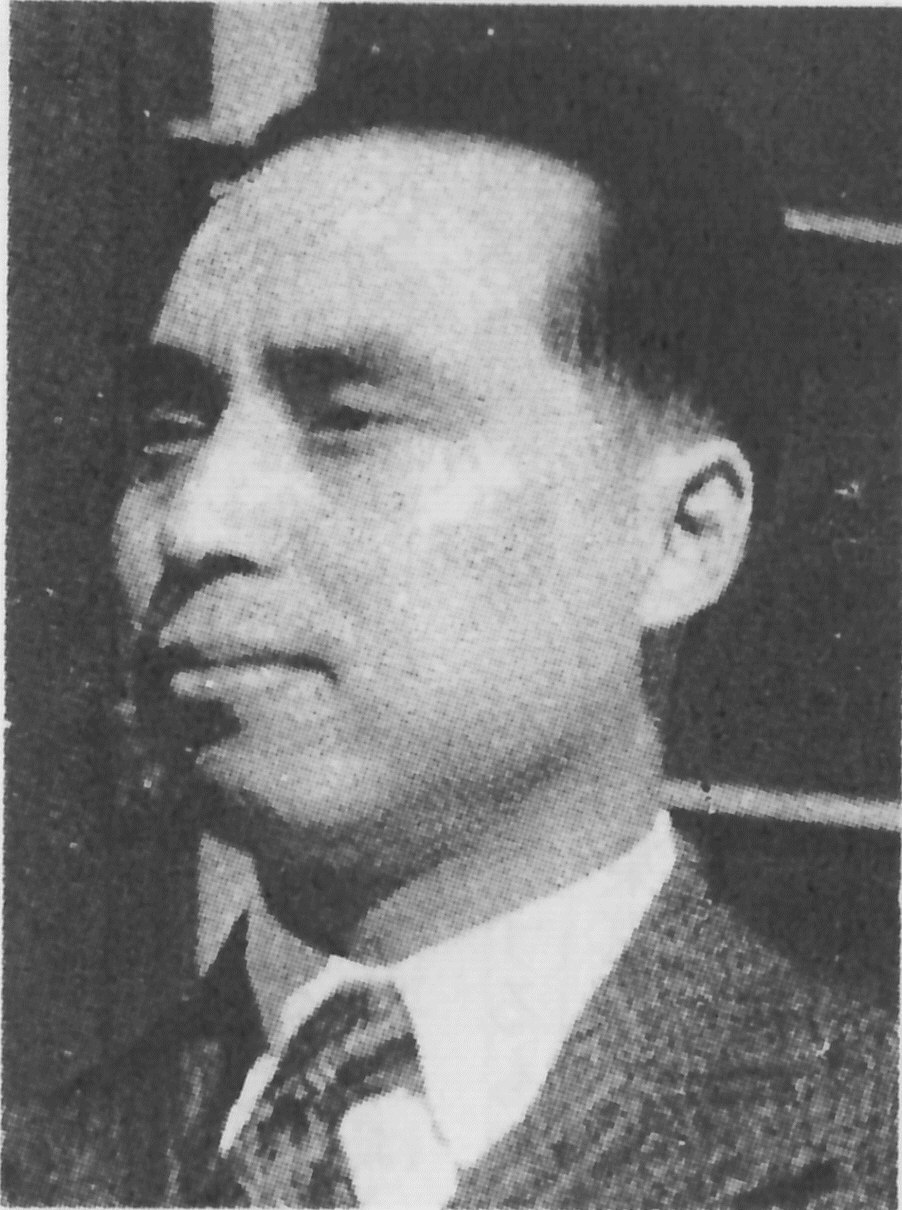
Zhou Longxiang

Zhou Longxiang (Chinese: 周隆庠; pinyin: Zhōu Lóngxiáng; Wade–Giles: Chou Long-hsiang) (1905–1969) was a politician in the Republic of China. He was an important politician during the Wang Jingwei regime. He was born in Wuxi, Jiangsu.

== Biography ==
He went to Japan where he graduated the Kyushu Imperial University in 1932. Later he returned to China, he became a Japanese interpreter for Wang Jingwei. At the end of 1937, he served the positions in the Bureau for Information of the Ministry for Foreign Affairs.

In May 1938 Zhou Longxiang went to Japan with Gao Zongwu (高宗武) suggested by Wang Jingwei, and negotiated with Japanese Government about peace between China and Japan. In May 1939 Wang escaped from China to Japan and negotiated with Japanese Prime Minister Kiichiro Hiranuma, on that time Zhou served as interpreter for them. Zhou was appointed Central Member of the Kuomintang (Wang's clique) on same August. In November Zhou Longxiang, Zhou Fohai, Tao Xisheng (陶希聖) and Mei Siping (梅思平) negotiated about conditions for peace with Sadaaki Kagesa (影佐禎昭) who was Chief to the 8th Section of the General Staff Headquarters, Imperial Japanese Army.

In March 1940 Zhou Longxiang was appointed Member to the Advisory Committee for Foreign Affairs of the Central Political Committee. In April he was promoted to be Executive Vice-Minister for Foreign Affairs (he took office formally on same July) and Chief to the Bureau for Asia of the Ministry for Foreign Affairs. In June 1941 Zhou visited Japan in the suite of Wang Jingwei, and Zhou served as interpreter. In October Zhou was appointed Political Vice-Minister for Foreign Affairs (his position was reformed to Vice-Minister for Foreign Affairs in January 1943).

In September 1942 Zhou Longxiang was promoted to be Chief Secretary of the Executive Yuan. In November when Wang Jingwei went to Japan for Greater East Asia Conference, Zhou was in Wang's retinue, and served as interpreter. In May 1944 Zhou was appointed Vice-Chief Secretary to the Supreme National Defense Council of the Central Political Committee. In November Wang died in Japan, Zhou was transferred to Chief of the Civil Servant, and served a Japanese interpreter for Chen Gongbo.

After the Wang Jingwei Regime had collapsed, Zhou Longxiang defected to Japan in the suite of Chen Gongbo, but in October 1945 he was extradited to China under diplomatic pressure from Chiang Kai-shek. Later because of the charge of treason and surrender to enemy (namely Hanjian), Zhou was sentenced to life imprisonment.

Zhou Longxiang died of illness at Shanghai in 1969.
