= Zhu Lühe =

Chinese politician (1877–1945)

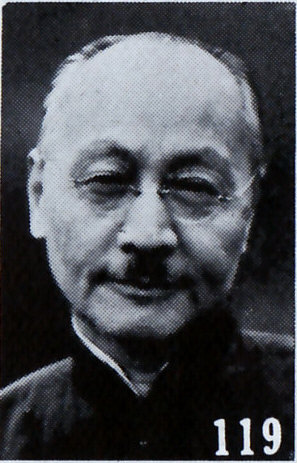
Zhu Lühe as pictured in The Most Recent Biographies of Chinese Dignitaries

Zhu Lühe (Chinese: 朱履龢; pinyin: Zhū Lǚhé; Wade–Giles: Chu Lü-he; 1877 April 13, 1945) was a politician and judicial officer in the Republic of China. He was an important politician during the Reformed Government of the Republic of China and the Wang Jingwei regime. His courtesy name was Xiaoshan (笑山). He was born in Jiaxing, Zhejiang.

== Biography ==
Zhu studied in the United Kingdom. He later returned to China and became the secretary of the Debate Commission for Legal and Rights (法權討論會) and the Special Conference for Customs.

In June 1927, he was appointed as the chief of the Bureau for General Affairs of the Ministry for Foreign Affairs, National Government. In October, he was transferred to the Second Bureau of the same ministry, becoming its chief. The next February, he was appointed the secretary of the Ministry for Justice, and the next month (Note: In October 1928, the Ministry for Justice was reformed to the Ministry for Judicial Administration.) he was promoted to Vice-Minister for Justice (his position became the Political Affairs Vice-Minister in November). In April 1930, he was promoted to acting minister for Judicial Administration, and in December, he also became a member of the Legislative Yuan. The next December, Luo Wengan (羅文幹) was appointed Minister for Justice, so Zhu returned to the position of Political Affairs Vice-Minister for Judicial Administration. In January 1932, he resigned his post.

In August 1938, Zhu was appointed the Vice-Minister for Judicial Administration. The next May, he was promoted to Chief Justice of the Supreme Court. In March 1940, when the Wang Jinwei Regime was established, Zhu was appointed the vice-chief of the Judicial Yuan and a member of the Central Political Committee. In April, Zhu also became the chairperson of the Disciplinary Action Committee for Central Public Servants.

On April 13, 1945, Zhu died in Nanjing at the age of 69.
