= Chu Lanlan =

Chinese opera singer (1982–2022)

- Born: 1982; Beijing, China
- Died: 30 December 2022 (aged 40); Beijing, China
- Occupation: Peking opera singer

Chu Lanlan (Chinese: 朱兰兰; 1982 – 30 December 2022) was a Chinese opera singer.

Chu made her singing debut on television in 1990, when she was eight years old. She studied at the Chinese Academy of Traditional Chinese Opera. Possessing a soprano range, Chu specialized in Peking Opera. She wrote the song and dance "Farewell My Concubine" for the Peking Opera. She also performed at the 2008 Summer Olympics.

Chu had also worked on projects on public welfare. Her last performance was in early November 2022 in which she was accompanied by her son. In December 2022, Chu died from the complications of COVID-19.
