= Mei Siping =

Chinese politician and traitor

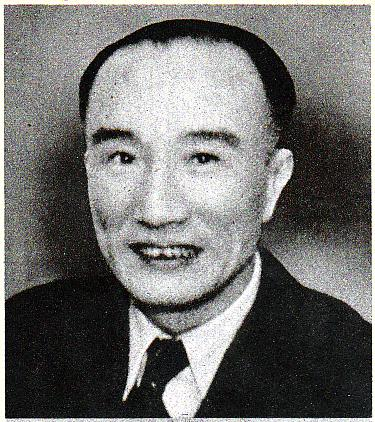
- Born: 梅思平; 1896
- Died: 14 September 1946 (aged 49/50)
- Other name: Mei Zufeng
- Political party: Kuomintang
- Status: Executed by shooting
- Conviction: Treason
- Penalty: Death

Mei Siping (Chinese: 梅思平; 1896 – September 14, 1946) was a Kuomintang politician of the Republic of China and associate of Wang Jingwei. He served in various posts in Wang's government in Nanjing, as well as second (and final) president of Southern University in 1945, and briefly held office as governor of his home province.

== Career ==
After the downfall of Wang's government, Mei was arrested and executed for collaboration. His daughter personally denounced him prior to his execution.

== Personal life ==
He was born in Wenzhou, Zhejiang.

== Bibliography ==
- Xu Youchun (徐友春) (main ed.) (2007). Unabridged Biographical Dictionary of the Republic, Revised and Enlarged Version (民国人物大辞典 增订版). Hebei People's Press (Hebei Renmin Chubanshe; 河北人民出版社). ISBN 978-7-202-03014-1.
- KWAN Kwok Huen「Mei Siping小伝」『伝記文学』ホームページ（Taiwan、要繁体字フォント）
- Liu Jie (2000). 漢奸裁判 対日協力者を襲った運命. Chuokoron-Shinsha（中公新書）. ISBN 978-4121015440.
- 劉寿林ほか編 (1995). 民国職官年表. Zhonghua Book Company. ISBN 7-101-01320-1.

Preceded by new office	Minister of Industry and Commerce; March 1940-August 1941	Succeeded by merged into Ministry of Business
Preceded by Wang Ruikai	Governor of Zhejiang; February–August 1941	Succeeded by Fu Shiyue
Preceded by created from merger of Ministries of Agriculture and Industry and Commerce	Minister of Business; August 1941-September 1943	Succeeded by Chen Junhui
Preceded by Chen Qun	Minister of the Interior; September 1943-August 1945	Succeeded by post abolished
