= Zhu Hongzhang =

Qing Dynasty general

Zhu Hongzhang (Chinese: 朱洪章; pinyin: Zhū Hóngzhāng; 1832–1895), courtesy name Huanwen (煥文), posthumous name Wushen (武慎), was an official official and a military general of the Qing dynasty of China. Born in Liping, Guizhou, he joined the Xiang Army to fight against the Taiping Rebellion and to restore the stability of the Qing dynasty. He was one of the nine generals who led a force of 60,000 troops to recover Nanjing from the Taiping Heavenly Kingdom in 1864. Zhu was awarded a third-class merit for the recovery of Nanjing for the Qing dynasty, after Commander Zeng Guoquan commended Zhu's work to the Qing government.

== The First-Wave Offensive ==
During the Battle of Nanjing (1864), on 19 July the attackers detonated explosives in a tunnel under Taiping Gate (太平), bringing somewhere between 2 and 10 km of the wall down. Zhu led 1800 soldiers through the breach, into the city, but 460 were killed by the bombs of the weakened Taiping defenders. Zhu's troops took Taiping on the following day. This won Zhu the Imperial yellow jacket merit.
