= Zhu Fulin =

Chinese politician sentenced to life in prison for bribery

- 朱福林

Governor of Jinhua
- In office 2008-2012

Personal details
- Born: November 1959 (age 66) Yiwu, Zhejiang, China
- Party: Chinese Communist Party (1990-2012)

Zhu Fulin (Chinese: 朱福林; born November 1959), from Yiwu, Zhejiang, is a former Chinese politician convicted of corruption and sentenced to life in prison. Zhu once served as deputy mayor of Jinhua City, Zhejiang.

In 2013, Zhu was sentenced to life imprisonment for bribery, accepting bribes worth 15 million yuan (US$2.45 million), and abusing his position to take cash in exchange for company environment report manipulation, real estate, and appointing officials. All of Zhu's personal property was confiscated, and Zhu was also deprived of political rights for life.

== Career ==
Zhu Fulin started working in December 1976 and joined the Chinese Communist Party in November 1990 with a master's degree. He used to be a soldier and cadre of the 026 Army of the PLA Infrastructure Engineering Corps; Cadre of Graduate Department of Hebei Normal University, lecturer and associate professor of the geography department.

Zhu Fulin's official career began in his hometown. As a professor of geography, Zhu Fulin found work in Jinhua Development Zone Management Committee as the deputy chief engineer of the development zone. After entering the official position, he served as deputy director of Jinhua Urban Construction Committee and deputy secretary and deputy director of the party group of Jinhua Land Management Planning Bureau (presiding); Director and Party Secretary of Jinhua Municipal Bureau of Land Management and Planning; Deputy Secretary and District Chief of Wucheng District Committee, Secretary of Lanxi Municipal Committee.

In 2008, Zhu Fulin became the vice mayor of Jinhua. During his four years as the deputy mayor of Jinhua, Zhu Fulin had been in charge of hot urban construction, planning, land, tourism and civil defense, and contacted the management committee of Shuanglong Scenic Area.

== Corruption ==
In August 2012, Zhu was detained by the Central Commission for Discipline Inspection and taken away by the Zhejiang Provincial Commission. Zhu was suspected of helping a real estate company take land illegally. Zhu's wife was also detained.

On August 15, 2013, Zhu's bribery case was heard by the Lishui Intermediate People's Court in Zhejiang. Procuratorial organs have found out through legal examination that from 2000 to 2012, Zhu Fulin took advantage of his position as director of Jinhua Land Management and Planning Bureau, secretary of Lanxi Municipal Party Committee, and deputy mayor of Jinhua City to seek benefits for others in matters such as land development, personnel arrangement, and enterprise environmental assessment.

Moreover, Zhu accepted 14.42 million yuan and 3000 euros of cash (totaling more than 15.8 million yuan), three gold bars, a Mazda car, and other gifts from 14 different people, including Xu Moumou (徐某某).

On December 20, 2013, the Lishui Intermediate People's Court sentenced Zhu Fulin to life in prison for bribery and taking advantage of his position. They also deprived his political rights for life and confiscated all his property.
