= Jun Zhu (statistician) =

American statistician and entomologist

Jun Zhu is a statistician and entomologist who works as a professor in the Departments of Statistics and Entomology at the University of Wisconsin–Madison. Her research interests involve the analysis of spatial data and spatio-temporal data, and the applications of this analysis in environmental statistics.

After earning a bachelor's degree from Knox College (Illinois) in mathematics and computer science in 1994, Zhu moved to Johns Hopkins University, where she earned a master's degree in mathematical sciences in 1995. She completed her Ph.D. in statistics at Iowa State University in 2000. Her dissertation, Asymptotic Inference for Spatial Cumulative Distribution Function, was jointly supervised by Soumendra Nath Lahiri and Noel Cressie.

Zhu serves on the Human Studies Review Board of the United States Environmental Protection Agency. In 2012 she chaired the American Statistical Association's Section on Statistics and the Environment. In 2015 she was elected as a Fellow of the American Statistical Association, and the Section on Statistics and the Environment gave her their Distinguished Achievement Medal.
