= Wang Ruikai =

Chinese politician (died 1941)

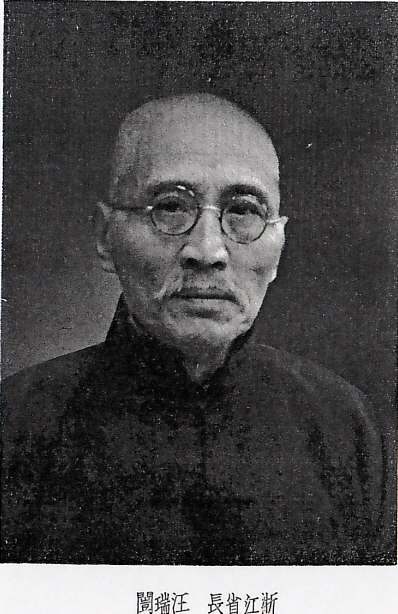
Wang Ruikai

Wang Ruikai (traditional Chinese: 汪瑞闓; simplified Chinese: 汪瑞恺; pinyin: Wāng Ruìkǎi; Wade-Giles: Wang Jui-k'ai) (? - January 24, 1941) was a politician in the Republic of China. He was Governor of Zhejiang during the Reformed Government of the Republic of China and the Wang Jingwei regime (Republic of China-Nanjing). He was born in Xuyi, Anhui.

== Biography ==
In 1912 Wang Ruikai was appointed as the first Governor of Jiangxi. When the Second Revolution (二次革命) broke out, he resigned his post; his resignation was in April 1914). In 1916 he was appointed as Councilor of the National Council (參政院).

In March 1938 Liang Hongzhi established the Reformed Government of the Republic of China; Wang Ruikai also participated in it. That May, the Zhejiang Provincial Government was established and Wang was appointed the first Governor of Zhejiang. In March 1940 the Wang Jingwei regime was established; Wang Ruikai stayed in his former position. That October, the Governorship of Zhejiang was renamed to the Chairmanship of Zhejiang since the system of provincial government was changed to the committee system. Wang Ruikai was appointed the Chairman of Zhejiang and thus kept his former position.

Wang Ruikai died while holding his post on January 24, 1941.
