= Zhu Pu (writer) =

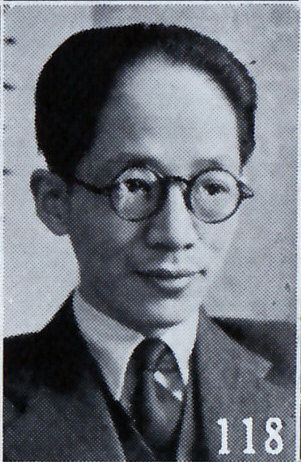
- Zhu Pu in The Most Recent Biographies of Chinese Dignitaries
- Born: Zhu Shengzhai; 1902; Wuxi County, Jiangsu Province, Qing China
- Died: December 9, 1970 (aged 67–68); Hong Kong
- Education: Public University of China
- Occupations: Writer; civil servant
- Employer: Oriental Magazine: Wang Jingwei regime
- Children: 2
- Writing career
- Years active: 1928-1970
- Genres: Short story; poetry; prose poetry; essay; history

Chinese name
- Traditional Chinese: 朱樸
- Simplified Chinese: 朱朴
Transcriptions
Standard Mandarin
- Hanyu Pinyin: zhū pǔ
- Wade–Giles: chu p'u

Birth Name
- Traditional Chinese: 朱省齋
- Simplified Chinese: 朱省斋
Transcriptions
Standard Mandarin
- Hanyu Pinyin: zhū shěng zhāi

Zhu Pu (Wades-Giles: Chu P'u; 1902-December 9, 1970), born Zhu Shengzhai, was a Chinese writer, art collector, and civil servant. While renowned for his poems and short stories about daily life, he remains a controversial figure due to his association with the pro-Japanese Wang Jingwei regime.

== Early life ==
Zhu Pu was born in Jingyun Village, Wuxi County, Jiangsu Province to a formerly wealthy family. His father, Zhu Shushan (Chinese: 朱述珊; pinyin: zhū shù shān) was a famous painter who died sometime after World War I. His birth name was Zhu Shengzhai(Chinese: 朱省齋; pinyin: zhū shěng zhāi). His courtesy name was Pu Zhi(Chinese: 樸之; pinyin: pǔ zhī). He later used the names Pu Yuan (Chinese: 樸園; pinyin: pǔ yuán), and finally Zhu Pu (Chinese: 朱樸; pinyin: zhū pǔ) in his writings. He was a student in the Donglin Academy from the ages of 7 to 10 years old. After graduating, he briefly became an apprentice in a paper mill due to his father lacking funds to send him to secondary school. Eventually, Zhu secretly returned home due to the unbearable labor. By this time, his family raised enough money to have him go to secondary school. After graduating, Zhu enrolled in commerce courses at the Public University of China (Chinese: 中國公學; pinyin: zhōng guó gōng xué).

== Meeting Wang Jingwei ==
Although Zhu was enrolled in the Public University of China, his family's financial status threatened his path towards graduation. However, his determination as a student convinced the Dean of the university to let him continue his studies. After graduating, he became friends with the future Kuomintang Governor of Jiangsu, Chen Guofu. In 1928, Zhu traveled to Europe to open up additional business opportunities between the West and China. While in Paris, he met Lin Bosheng, Zeng Zhongming, and Wang Jingwei.

== Writings and work under the Wang Jingwei regime ==
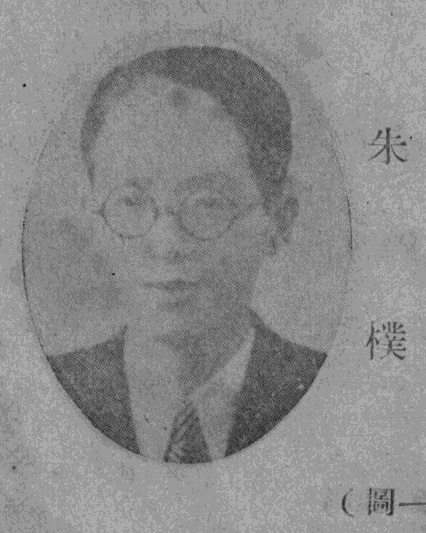
Zhu Pu in the 1937 Mirrors of the Personages of the Republic of China

Zhu Pu contributed to the Oriental Magazine. He wrote poems and stories about local customs in China and the daily lives of people. During the Second Sino-Japanese War, Zhu briefly worked as a deputy minister for Wang Jingwei's propaganda department. When his wife and eldest son died in 1941, he stopped working for the regime due to grief and despair. He then established the Gujin (Chinese: 古今; pinyin: gǔ jīn) journal in March 1942 where he would write stories and poetry. Gujin was eventually shut down in 1944.

== Later life and death ==
After the war, Zhu Pu briefly moved to Beijing. He then finally immigrated to Hong Kong in 1947 where he would run a calligraphy and art business. On December 9, 1970, he died of a heart attack under mysterious circumstances. A rumor about his death involved Zhu attempting to smuggle Qi Baishi's paintings from Communist China. Border guards attempted to arrest him, frightening Zhu to the point of death.
