= Yan Jiachi =

Chinese politician

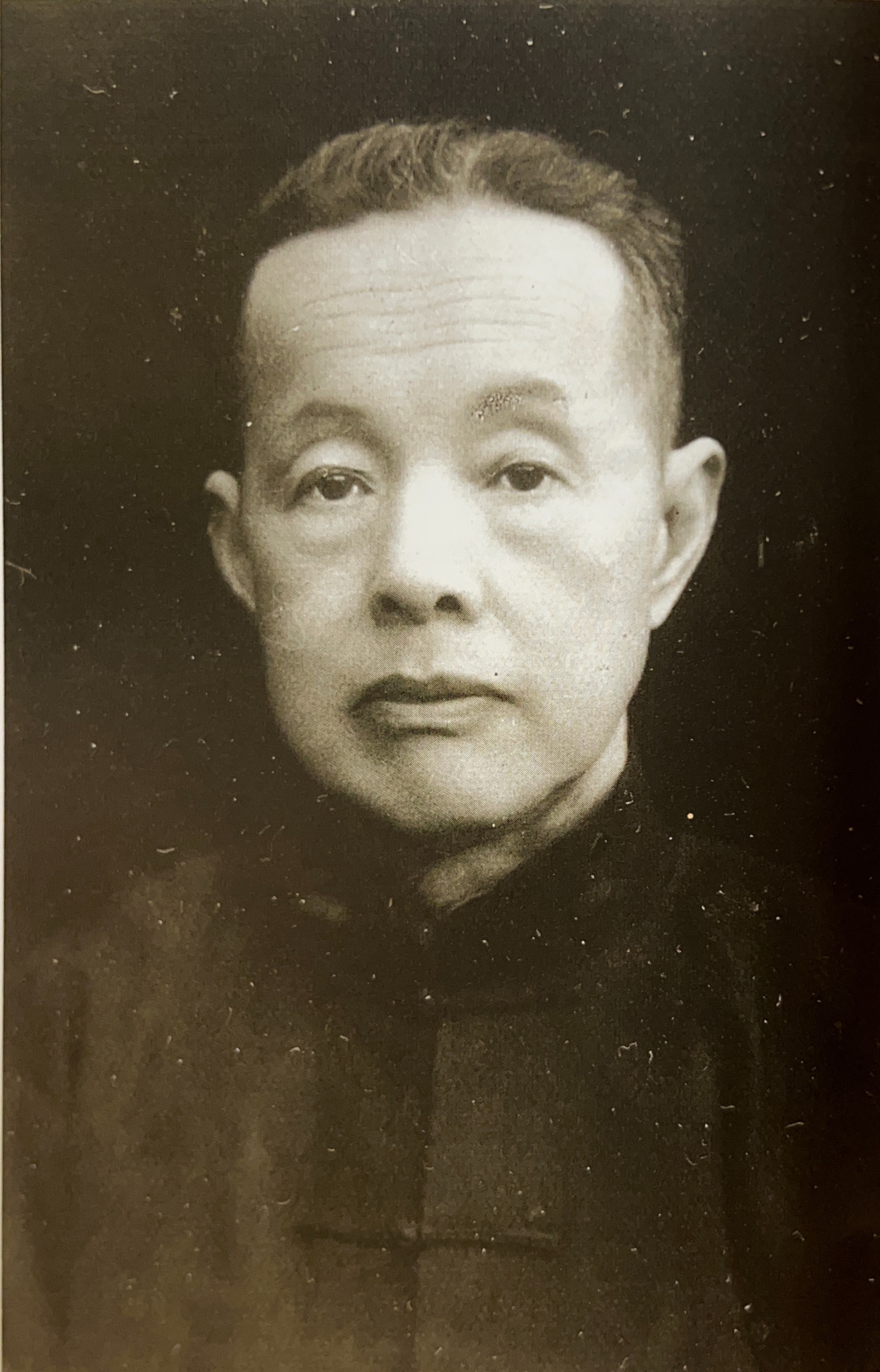

Yan Jiachi (simplified Chinese: 严家炽; traditional Chinese: 嚴家熾; pinyin: Yán Jiāchì; 1885–1952) was a politician in the end of Qing Dynasty and the Republic of China. He was a local official in the Qing and the Beijing Government. In the end, he became an important politician in the Reformed Government of the Republic of China and the Wang Jingwei regime (Republic of China-Nanjing). His courtesy name was Mengfan (孟繁). He was born in Wuxian (now, Wuzhong District and Xiangcheng District, Suzhou), Jiangsu.

== Biography ==
Yan Jiachi came of the Suzhou prestigious family, Dongshan Yan Family (東山嚴氏). He successively held the several local governors, for example, governor of the Jiujiang, governor of the Jingdezhen, governor of the Shaozhou (now, Shaoguan), governor of the Guangzhou, etc. When he was holding an office, he recovered the remains of 72 revolutionaries which was executed at Huanghuaguang (黃花崗).

In January 1913, Yan Jiachi was appointed to the chief of the preparation office for National Tax in Guangdong. It was not long before he was transferred to the manager of the Yuehai Barrier (粵海關). Next May, he promoted to the chief of the Financial Agency of Guangdong. In May 1915, he was transferred to the chief of the Financial agency of Hunan. Next August, he resigned his post. In October 1920, he was appointed to the chief of the Financial Agency of Jiangsu. In the same year, he became the General Manager of the Southeast University. In 1925, he resigned his post, and was appointed to the vice-chief of the general office for bureaucratic production in Hebei and Rehe.

In March 1938, Liang Hongzhi established the Reformed Government of the Republic of China. Yan Jiachi also participated in it, and was appointed to the Vice-Minister for Finance. In November, he resigned his post. Next April, the Minister for Finance Chen Jintao (陳錦濤) came down with illness, so Yan was appointed to the acting Minister (and Chen was dead on June), and he took office formally on September.

In March 1940, the Wang Jingwei regime was established, Yan Jiachi was appointed to the Political Affairs Vice-Minister for Finance and the Control Officer of the Control Yuan (監察院監察使). He worked as the Political Affairs Vice-Minister until January 1943, and worked as the Control Officer until May 1944.

After the Wang Jingwei regime had collapsed, Yan Jiachi was arrested by the Chiang Kai-shek's National Government. Because of the charge of the treason and surrender to enemy (namely Hanjian), he was sentenced to 13 years' penal servitude. After establishing the People's Republic of China, his treatment wasn't changed. He died in prison, Guangzhou in 1952.
