= North China Political Council =

Wang Jingwei regime autonomous zone

North China Political Council Chinese: 華北政務委員會 Japanese: 華北政務委員会
- 1940–1945
- Flag
- Motto: New People's Principles (Chinese: 新民主義)
- Status: Autonomous region of the Reorganized National Government of the Republic of China
- Capital and largest city: Beijing
- Common languages: Chinese
- Government: Dictatorship
- Chairman (Note: The Chairman served as the de facto head of state of the government.)
  - 1940–1943: Wang Yitang
  - 1943: Zhu Shen
  - 1943–1945: Wang Kemin
- Historical era: Second Sino-Japanese War
  - Tsingtao Conference: January 1940
  - Government established: 30 March 1940
  - Disestablished: 18 August 1945
Preceded by	Succeeded by
Provisional Government of the Republic of China	Republic of China
- Today part of: China

The North China Political Council or North China Political Affairs Commission (Chinese: 華北政務委員會; pinyin: Huáběi Zhèngwù Wěiyuánhuì; Japanese: 華北政務委員会), sometimes known as the Beijing regime, was an autonomous region under the Wang Jingwei regime that existed during the Second Sino-Japanese War.

Formed on 30 March 1940, it succeeded the Provisional Government of the Republic of China when that regime was merged into the newly established Reorganized National Government of the Republic of China led by Wang Jingwei in Nanjing. The council was a puppet administration of Japan, operating under the direct supervision of the Japanese North China Area Army.

== Background and Formation ==
Following the outbreak of the Second Sino-Japanese War in July 1937, the Japanese military established regional puppet administrations in occupied territories. The Japanese North China Area Army sponsored the establishment of the Provisional Government of the Republic of China in Beijing on 14 December 1937. This government was dominated by the executive committee chaired by Wang Kemin.

In January 1940, a conference was held at Tsingtao to draft a unified collaborationist central government under Wang Jingwei in Nanjing, agreeing that while Nanjing would serve as the capital of the Reorganized National Government, the Beijing regime would retain its autonomy. On 30 March 1940, the Nanjing government was officially established, and the former Provisional Government was restructured into the North China Political Council.

== Provincial Administration ==
The Council exercised administrative oversight over five provincial administrations in occupied northern China. The provinces were governed by regional collaborators.

Hebei was led by Wu Zanzhou and controlled Beijing and Tianjin. Shanxi was led by Su Tiren, who was selected due to his connections to the regional warlord Yan Xishan, and controlled Taiyuan. Shandong was under Tang Yangdu, and administered all but four of the province's 105 counties. Henan was led by Chen Jingzhi and operated out of Kaifeng, controlling the area east of the New Yellow River. Additionally, the Xuzhou Special District Commissioner's Office supervised 18 counties in northern Jiangsu and 10 counties in northern Anhui.

== Currency ==
Established under the Provisional Government in March 1938, the United Reserve Bank issued its own United Reserve Bank notes (lianyin-quan). The Japanese forced the local population to exchange the fabi for these notes to undermine the Nationalist government's monetary control. Even after the Wang Jingwei regime created the Central Reserve Bank in 1941, the United Reserve Bank kept operating and issuing currency in the North until the end of the war.

== Military ==
The military forces of the North China Political Council, though part of the Collaborationist Chinese Army, operated under the command of the Council and its Japanese advisors, not Nanjing.

The Provisional Government's military force, the North China Peace Preservation Army (Chinese: 华北治安军), was initially established in October 1939. The force completed its initial phase in September 1940, consisting of 8 regiments organized into three group commands and two independent regiments. These units were deployed in Hebei and Shandong provinces to assist the Japanese military in securing local transport routes and strongpoints. Under the new administration, this force was renamed to the North China Pacification Army (华北绥靖军).

The regular forces grew in phases, expanding from the initial 8 regiments to 22 regiments during the Hundred Regiments Offensive in late 1940, 29 regiments in late 1941, and 34 regiments plus 1 training group totaling 37,000 men in 1942. The Japanese China Expeditionary Army sought to maintain a force strength of 100,000 regular troops under the Council (compared to 110,000 under Nanjing and 10,000 under Mengjiang). However, the total collaborationist army strength in the north was only 118,000 men.

=== Security Forces ===
In addition to the regular army, the Council maintained extensive local police and security detachments. For example, the Hebei Provincial Government trained and deployed a 20,000-man police force and a 2,500-man security force distributed across rural townships. To secure the countryside, the Japanese North China Area Army set a target of maintaining 300 police or security troops in each county. In early 1940, the police forces of Shanxi, Shandong, Hunan, and Hebei totaled approximately 72,500 men.

Japanese Army Minister Hideki Tojo and Chief of Staff Sugiyama Gen held a meeting in December 1940 and agreed to expand local police for the pacification of North China, reaching 69,000 county-level armed police under the direct supervision of Japanese military police by late 1941.

== Sources ==
- Kataoka, Tetsuya (1974). Resistance and Revolution in China: The Communists and the Second United Front. University of California Press.
