= Wang Kemin =

Chinese politician (1879–1945)

- 王克敏
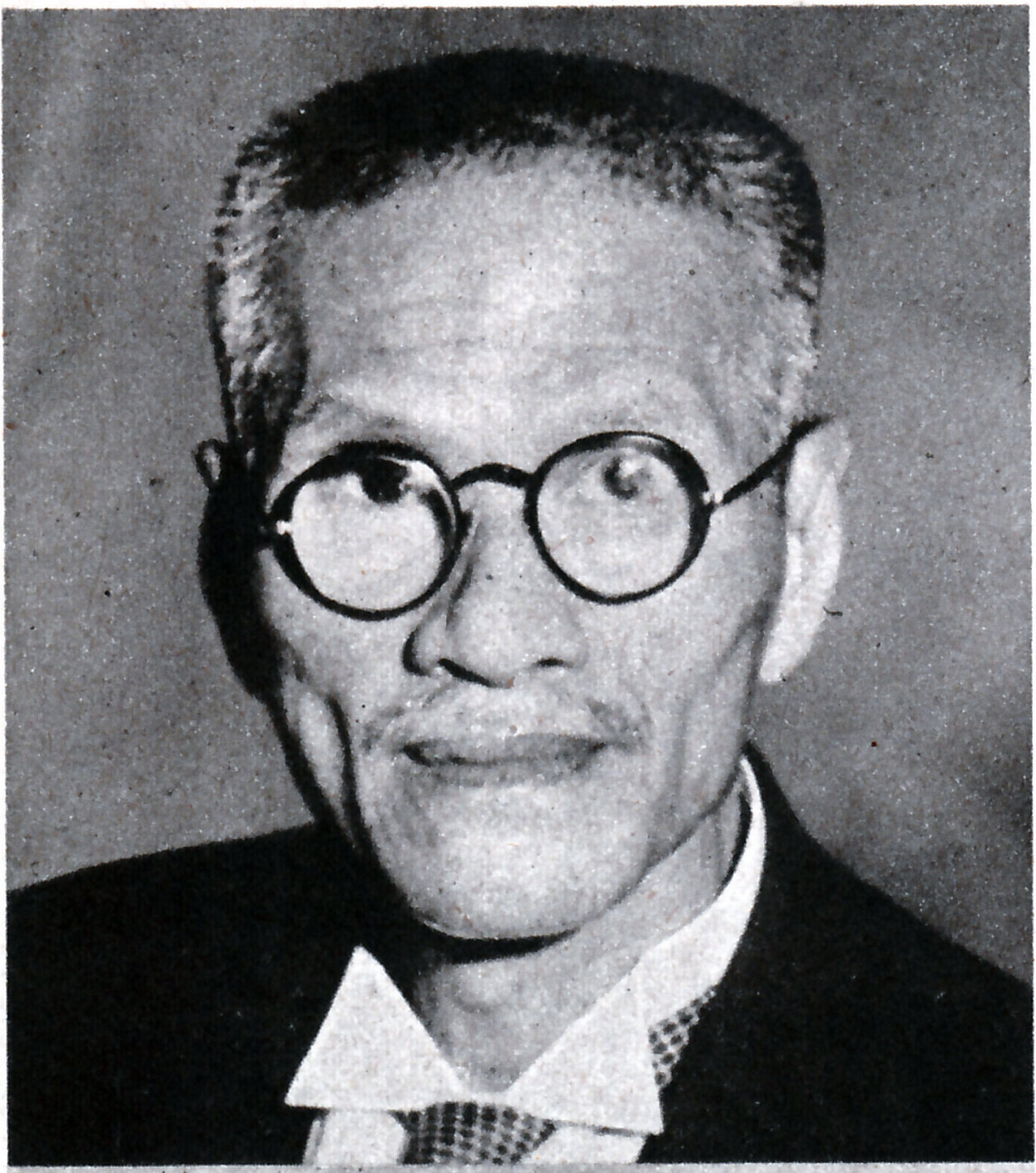

President of the Executive Council of the Provisional Government of the Republic of China
- In office 14 December 1937 – 30 March 1940
- Preceded by: Position Established
- Succeeded by: Position Abolished

Minister of Administration of the Provisional Government of the Republic of China
- In office 14 December 1937 – 30 March 1940
- Preceded by: Position Established
- Succeeded by: Position Abolished

Chairman of the North China Political Council
- In office 30 March 1940 – 5 June 1940
- Preceded by: Position Established
- Succeeded by: Wang Yitang
- In office 2 July 1943 – 8 February 1945
- Preceded by: Zhu Shen
- Succeeded by: Wang Yintai

Minister of Finance of the Beiyang government of the Republic of China
- In office 1 December 1917 – 23 March 1918
- President: Feng Guozhang
- Premier: Wang Shizhen
- Preceded by: Liang Qichao; Li Sihao (acting since 22 November 1917)
- Succeeded by: Cao Rulin
- In office 10 July 1923 – 24 July 1923
- President: Gao Lingwei (acting)
- Premier: Gao Lingwei (acting)
- Preceded by: Zhang Yinghua
- Succeeded by: Zhang Hu (acting)
- In office 12 November 1923 – 31 October 1924
- President: Cao Kun
- Premier: Gao Lingwei (acting); Sun Baoqi; Wellington Koo; Yan Huiqing
- Preceded by: Zhang Hu
- Succeeded by: Chengting T. Wang
- In office 13 May 1926 – 13 May 1926 (Note: Following the collapse of Duan Qirui's provisional government, the Second Yan Huiqing Cabinet was fully restored before the nomination of new ministers to establish legitimacy. Neither Wu Peifu nor Yan Huiqing himself wanted Wang to stay in the government, so Wang was dismissed immediately after being installed. Wellington Koo was nominated as the replacement, but he refused to assume the post until 8 June 1926.)
- President: Yan Huiqing (acting)
- Premier: Yan Huiqing (acting)
- Preceded by: He Delin
- Succeeded by: Wellington Koo; Liu Fu (acting) (Note: Largely due to the conflict between the Zhili and the Fengtian cliques, the Yan Huiqing Regency Cabinet was never able to inaugurate. As such, Liu kept acting the post as the vice minister until the cabinet collapsed at 22 June 1926.)

Personal details
- Born: May 4, 1879 Hangzhou, Zhejiang Province, Empire of China
- Died: December 25, 1945 (aged 66) Beijing, Republic of China

Wang Kemin (Chinese: 王克敏; pinyin: Wáng Kèmǐn; Wade-Giles: Wang K'o-min, May 4, 1879 – December 25, 1945) was a Chinese politician. A leading official in the Chinese republican movement and early Beiyang government of the Republic of China, later noted for his role as in the collaborationist Provisional Government of the Republic of China and Wang Jingwei regime during World War II.

== Biography ==
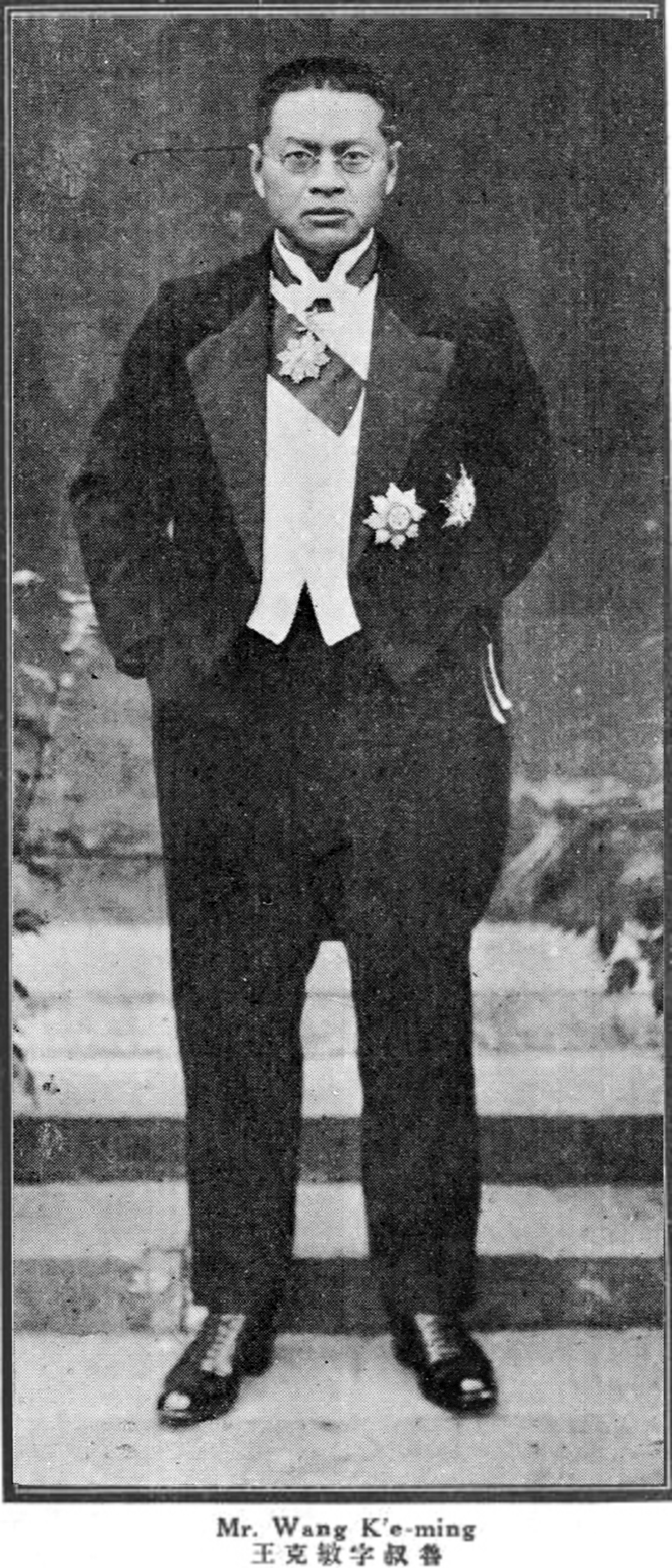
Wang Kemin during China's Beiyang government

Wang was a native of Hangzhou in Zhejiang province. In 1901, he was dispatched by the government of Qing Dynasty China to Japan, where he studied western economics and accounting from his nominal position as attaché at the Chinese embassy in Tokyo. After his return to China in 1907, he was appointed to a post under the Viceroy of Zhili to manage foreign affairs. After the Republic of China had been established, he was sent to France in 1913. On his return, by orders of Duan Qirui he helped establish the Bank of China, and became its president from July 1917. He served as the Chinese minister of finance under the Beiyang Government from December 1917 to March 1918. In December 1918, he was the only representative of the Beiyang Government to attend a meeting with the Nanjing Government in an attempt to reunify China.

He served as Minister of Finance again from July–August 1923 under the premiership of Gao Lingwei. However, Wang was strongly opposed by the Fengtian clique led by Zhang Zuolin, and forced to resign his post after only a week. He returned as Minister of Finance with the support of Cao Kun of the Zhili clique from November 1923-October 1924. During this time, he also oversaw the operations of a number of other banks, including the Bank of Tianjin.

After the success of Chiang Kai-shek's Northern Expedition a warrant for Wang's arrest was issued by the Kuomintang and he fled to Dalian in the Kwantung Leased Territory under Japanese jurisdiction.

In 1931, Wang Kemin returned to Beijing when Zhang Xueliang took control of Hebei Province, and took a post in the Peking Finance committee. He became mayor of Tianjin in 1932. In 1935 Wang was in the Kuomintang Hebei Government and had a post in the Northeast Government Affairs Committee, and the Peking Government Affairs Committee and other important posts. However, he retired to Shanghai in 1935.

After the Second Sino-Japanese War broke out in 1937, the Imperial Japanese Army quickly overran North China, and the Japanese Imperial General Headquarters authorized the creation of a collaborationist regime as part of its overall strategy to establish an autonomous buffer zone between China and Japanese-controlled Manchukuo. This government was based in Beijing, and proclaimed Wang Kemin accepted the post of President of the Provisional Government of the Republic of China, with its capital in Beijing on December 14, 1937. The government nominally controlled the provinces of Hebei, Shandong, Shanxi, Henan and Jiangsu. But its activities were carefully prescribed and overseen by advisors provided by the Japanese Northern China Area Army. The failure of the Japanese to give any real authority to the Provisional Government discredited it in the eyes of the local inhabitants, and made its existence of only limited propaganda utility to the Japanese authorities.

The Provisional Government was, along with the Reformed Government of the Republic of China, merged into Wang Jingwei's Nanjing Nationalist Government on March 30, 1940, but in practical terms actually remained virtually independent under the name of the "North China Political Council" (華北政務委員會) until the end of the war. Wang Kemin retained power as Chairman of the North China Political Council, as well as becoming Internal Affairs Minister in the Nanjing Nationalist Government.

Wang was arrested by the government of the Republic of China after the surrender of Japan and tried for treason. He committed suicide before the conclusion of his trial on December 25, 1945.

== Bibliography ==
- David P. Barrett and Larry N. Shyu, eds.; Chinese Collaboration with Japan, 1932-1945: The Limits of Accommodation Stanford University Press 2001
- John H. Boyle, China and Japan at War, 1937–1945: The Politics of Collaboration (Harvard University Press, 1972).
- James C. Hsiung and Steven I. Levine, eds., China's Bitter Victory: The War with Japan, 1937–1945 (Armonk, N.Y.: M. E. Sharpe, 1992)
- Ch'i Hsi-sheng, Nationalist China at War: Military Defeats and Political Collapse, 1937–1945 (Ann Arbor: University of Michigan Press, 1982).
- Frederick W. Mote, Japanese-Sponsored Governments in China, 1937–1945 (Stanford University Press, 1954).
- Howard L Boorman and Richard C. Howard, eds.; Biographical Dictionary of Republican China, Volume I: AI - CH'U, Columbia University Press, 1967.
