= Provisional Government of the Republic of China (1937–1940) =

Chinese puppet state of the Empire of Japan

Provisional Government of the Republic of China Chinese: 中華民國臨時政府 Japanese: 中華民国臨時政府 Zhōnghuá Mínguó Línshí Zhèngfǔ Chūka Minkoku Rinji Seifu
- 1937–1940
- Five Races Under One Union Flag
- Motto: New People's Principles (Chinese: 新民主義)
- Anthem: Song to the Auspicious Cloud (1937–1940) (Note: Modified version used in 1921–1928.)
- Status: Unrecognized government Puppet government of the Empire of Japan
- Capital and largest city: Beijing
- Common languages: Chinese
- Government: Dictatorship
- President of the Executive Council (Note: traditional Chinese: 行政委員會委員長; simplified Chinese: 行政委员会委员长; pinyin: Xíngzhèng Wěiyuánhuì Wěiyuánzhǎng)
  - 1937–1940: Wang Kemin
- Historical era: Second Sino-Japanese War
  - Marco Polo Bridge Incident: 7 July 1937
  - Government established: 14 December 1937
  - Merged into Reorganized National Government: 30 March 1940
Preceded by	Succeeded by
Republic of China; East Hebei Autonomous Government	Reorganized National Government of China; North China Political Council

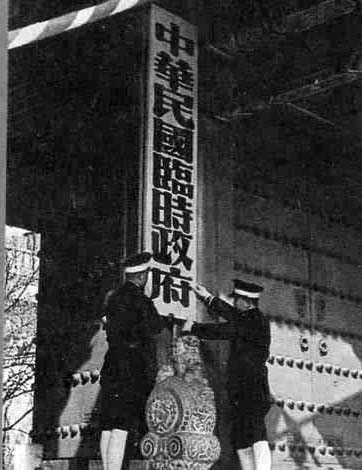
The sign of the government unveiled in Zhongnanhai in Beijing on December 14, 1937

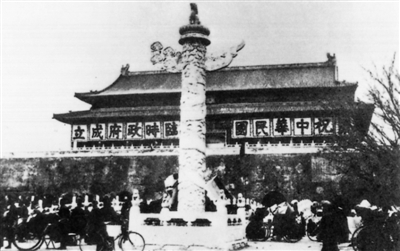
Signs on Tiananmen Gate hailing the founding of the government in 1937

The Provisional Government of the Republic of China (Note: traditional Chinese: 中華民國臨時政府; simplified Chinese: 中华民国临时政府; pinyin: Zhōnghuá Mínguó Línshí Zhèngfǔ, or Japanese: 中華民国臨時政府, romanized: Chūka Minkoku Rinji Seifu) was a puppet government of the Empire of Japan that existed in China from 1937 to 1940 during the Second Sino-Japanese War. It had been formed largely on the initiative of Imperial Japanese Army commanders in north China, before securing approval from Japanese government authorities in Tokyo. Thus the Provisional Government had nominal authority in Japanese occupied zones in north China, while to the south the Central China Expeditionary Army established the Reformed Government of the Republic of China in 1938, which had authority in the Yangtze River area. Both essentially served as a local organ of the Japanese military authorities, due to the presence and extensive powers of Japanese advisors within the Provisional Government over native Chinese bureaucrats, and because it never made any attempt to secure international recognition, even from Japan.

== History ==
After the conquest of Northern China, Japanese Imperial General Headquarters authorized the creation of a collaborationist regime as part of its overall strategy to establish an autonomous buffer zone between China and Japanese-controlled Manchukuo. Initially, this resulted in the creation of local and provincial autonomous administrations, such as the East Hebei Autonomous Government. But plans were drawn up throughout 1937 to unite all of these smaller regimes into one that would serve as a future central government of China. The Provisional Government united these smaller local councils and nominally controlled the provinces of Hebei, Shandong, Shanxi, Henan and Jiangsu. However, the regime's real influence was largely limited to where Japanese military control extended permanently, which meant its jurisdiction was in larger cities and railways. The authority of the Provisional Government was further limited by the existence of the Inner Mongolian autonomous government and the continued resistance of the East Hebei Government to fully integrate.

The Provisional Government of the Republic of China was officially inaugurated by Wang Kemin, former Kuomintang Minister of Finance and Shanghai banker, on 14 December 1937, with its capital at Beijing. Wang was assisted by Tang Erho, who served as chairman of the Legislative Yuan and Minister of Education. Initially Major General Seiichi Kita, the head of the local Japanese special services and foremost "puppeteer" in north China on whose initiative the Provisional Government would be formed, wanted the head of state to be either Cao Kun or Wu Peifu, former warlords of the early republican period who had some national fame in China. But neither one took up the post because their price for collaboration was too high. In the end, the Provisional Government leadership did not include anyone of renown or fame. Many of its members were older bureaucrats whose careers spanned the early republican era (1910s and 1920s) and even the preceding Qing dynasty. Some had picked the wrong side during the warlord era and thus were bitterly anti-Kuomintang. The difficulty that Kita and other Japanese administrators faced in recruiting members for the puppet regime caused a delay of its formation.

Its activities were carefully prescribed and overseen by advisors provided by the Japanese Northern China Area Army. The failure of the Japanese to give any real authority to the Provisional Government discredited it in the eyes of the local inhabitants, and made its existence of only limited propaganda utility to the Japanese authorities.

The Provisional Government was, along with the Reformed Government of the Republic of China, merged into Wang Jingwei's Nanjing-based reorganized national government on 30 March 1940, but in practical terms actually remained virtually independent under the name of the "North China Political Council" (華北政務委員會) until the end of the war. Many of the same members of the Provisional Government continued to serve the Japanese in north China throughout the 1940s in their original capacities.

== Politics ==
The main source of its sovereignty was a constitution written by an unelected committee. The internal structure of the Provisional Government was similar to the Kuomintang government of Chiang Kai-shek, but in practice there was little division of power between the different branches, which were the four yuan: Executive, Legislative, Control, and Judicial (the Examination Yuan's powers had been given to the ministry of education). The Control Yuan was abolished not long after the government was established. The Executive Yuan was given great powers at the expense of the other branches, however, such as deciding all legislation and having the Legislative Yuan (whose members were appointed by the Executive) merely rubber stamp its decisions. The Executive supervised five ministries, which did not include either a foreign affairs or military ministry, most notably (although there was a ministry of public security). The Provisional Government never made any serious attempt to secure international recognition, not even from Japan. Some representatives had been sent to Tokyo but these were more "ambassadors of goodwill" rather than officially accredited diplomats. No formal treaties or other agreements were concluded by the Provisional Government, with all negotiations done directly with the authorities of the Japanese North China Area Army.

Its official ideology was Confucianism, and it condemned the Kuomintang and Chiang Kai-shek for destroying China with their policies. The Provisional Government took the view that the Kuomintang took unnecessarily hostile actions towards Japan, allied with the Soviet Union and the Chinese Communists, and thus ended up damaging China. The ideas of Confucianism, such as the "kingly way," were considered by the government to be antidotes to the social damage caused by Sun Yat-sen's Three Principles of the People. As it sought to distance itself from the Chinese Nationalist principles this later brought contention with the other collaborator Wang Jingwei when negotiations occurred to bring the Provisional Government under the fold of his new Reorganized National Government of China in 1940, which portrayed itself as the legitimate heirs of the Kuomintang.

The Education Ministry and the "New People's Society" were in charge of spreading these aforementioned ideas through the usage of propaganda. The latter group had been established as the brainchild of Major General Seiichi Kita, modeled on the Concordia Association in neighboring Manchukuo. It was essentially a political organ that was designed to spread the government's ideas to the public and mobilize economic and military support for the Provisional Government and Japan. The New People's Society was not a mass organization with millions of members but a small tight-knit group that included many smaller sub-organizations. Among their activities ranged from training future civil servants, sending students to Japan, giving medical services to remote villages, providing disaster relief, establish free tea houses, promoting Chinese art and pilgrimages to Confucian temples, as well as discussing political events in their radio stations and official newspaper, the New People's Daily. The core values emphasized were Confucian virtues, familial piety, respect for authority, and devotion to scholarship. In the end, however, the organization failed to rally mass public support for the Provisional Government and Japan, being countered by the Communist Party's propaganda.

=== Officials ===
Minister	Post	Former Post in the Beiyang Government
Wang Kemin	President of the Executive Council; Minister of Administration	Minister of Finance
Tang Erho	President of the Discussion Council; Minister of Education	Minister of Finance
Dong Kang	President of the Judiciary Council	Minister of Justice; Minister of Finance
Wang Yitang	Minister of the Interior	Minister of Interior Affairs
Qi Xieyuan	Minister of Security; Commander-in-chief of the North China Pacification Army	Military Inspector of Jiangsu
Wang Yintai	Minister of Industry	Minister of Foreign Affairs; Minister of Justice
Jiang Chaozong	Mayor of the Beijing Special City	Infantry Commander
Gao Lingwei	Mayor of the Tianjin Special City	Minister of Interior Affairs; Acting Premier

== Economy ==
In March 1938 the Japanese had the Provisional Government establish a United Reserve Bank with the primary intent of severing north China's financial structures from the rest of Kuomintang-controlled China, as well as to shatter the finances of the Kuomintang government by destabilizing its currency. The Provisional Government declared that the Chinese national currency used by the Nationalists could only remain in circulation for one year before its own United Reserve Bank notes would become the primary currency of the region. It allowed the regime to offset its lack of ability to collect tax revenues from its nominal territory, for a time.

However, it was not long before mass inflation began and neither Chinese merchants nor Japanese businessmen decided to accept the new bank notes. The Kuomintang currency remained in use everywhere outside of the Japanese military's immediate reach, while Communist guerrillas operating in north China declared it illegal to possess United Reserve Bank notes. Also, foreign businesses operating in the port of Tianjin refused to accept the new currency. The circulation of Japanese military scrips for the purchases of local goods and the introduction of Bank of Japan yen notes also added to the confusion.

The Federal Reserve Notes continued to be one of three separate currencies in the Japanese-occupied areas of China until the Japan's defeat.

The trafficking of opium also played a major role in the financial activities of the Japanese military in north China. A so-called "Opium Prohibition Bureau" had been established, but it actually had the task of bringing the narcotics trade under the control of the authorities rather than suppressing it. Most of the major industries in north China had been placed under the control of Japanese businesses, and while a Sino-Japanese Economic Council had been established in March 1938 in Beijing with the intent of being used to resolve disputes over economic matters, in the end the final decisions regarding the economy were still made in Tokyo. Industries such as resource production (iron, coal, electricity, etc.) as well as communications and transportation had been placed in the hands of either the China Development Company, an offshoot of the South Manchurian Railway Company that was under the Japanese military's control, or major Japanese firms. However, there was little Japanese or Chinese capital attracted to such ventures in north China, and as the war went on Japan's primary emphasis was placed on resource extraction for its war effort, rather than such projects as in improving the local infrastructure.

=== Transportation ===
In 1938 the Provisional Government nationalised railway and bus companies, and the North China Transportation Company was established to manage all railway and bus services in the government's territories.

== Military ==
The security of the Provisional Government was at first based around a 5,000-man police force. The Provisional Government Army began to be organized in May 1938 with the organization of a Japanese-run military academy in Tongzhou. Non-commissioned officers (NCOs) began six months of training in February 1939 and the army officially formed in September 1939. At first the Army had to fill most of the officer and NCO slots with former Nationalist officers until the newly trained officers could take charge. The army's target strength was to consist of 13,200 men in eight infantry regiments of 1,650 men each. Six of the regiments were organized in three brigades of two regiments each and put under the command of a Chinese Major General with a Japanese advisor. In addition, a 400-man-strong bodyguard was formed to protect government officials after all of Wang Kemin's Japanese bodyguards were assassinated.

The order of battle as of September 1939 was as follows:

- 1st Brigade 'Beijing' (Maj. Gen. Liu Fengzhi)
  - 1st Regiment (Beijing)
  - 2nd Regiment (Tongzhou)
- 2nd Brigade 'Baoding' (Maj. Gen. Huang Nanbeng)
  - 3rd Regiment (Baoding)
  - 4th Regiment (Zhengding)
- 3rd Brigade 'Kaiping' (Maj. Gen. Lu Zhensheng)
  - 5th Regiment (Kaiping)
  - 6th Regiment (Tangshan)
- 7th Independent Regiment 'Tianjin' (Col. Sun Zhizhang)
- 8th Independent Regiment 'Jinan' (Col. Ma Wenzhi)

After the formation of the Nanjing Nationalist Government under Wang Jingwei, the troops that had formerly been under the Provisional Government effectively remained under the authority of the North China Political Council led by Wang Kemin. By 1940, it was reported that the local army in north China numbered some 26,000 men, which were increased to 41,000 due to a recruitment drive, organized into 22 regiments along with eight independent and training regiments. Local police forces numbered some 135,000 while local militia were around 200,000, but the latter were regarded as completely unreliable by the Japanese due to lack of training and weapons.

== See also ==
- Reformed Government of the Republic of China

== Notes ==
Preceded by National Government (1927–1948)	Provisional Government of the Republic of China; 1937–1940	Succeeded by Wang Jingwei's reorganized National Government (1940–1945)
