= Tongcheng Secondary School =

School in Tongcheng, Anhui, China

Tongcheng Secondary School (Chinese: 桐城中学) is a secondary school in Tongcheng, Anhui, China.

== Notable alumni ==
- Chu Bo (zh: 儲波) - Former Governor of Hunan Province
- Ci Yungui (zh: 慈云桂) - Government official
- Fang Chih (zh: 方治) - Chinese diplomat
- Fang Dongmei (zh: 方东美) - Author, philosopher
- Huang Zhen (zh: 黄镇) - Chinese politician
- Lu Dadao (zh: 陆大道) - Author
- Shi Congyun - (zh: 施从云) - Qing warlord during the Xinhai Revolution
- Wang Sheng (zh: 王胜) - Huaiyuan County Warlord
- Wu Zipei (zh: 吴子培) - Revolutionary figure
- Yu Guanglang (zh: 余光烺) - Revolutionary figure
- Zhang Bojun - Revolutionary figure, mayor of Beiping
- Zhu Guangqian - Author and activist
