= Ku Cheng-kang =

Chinese politician (1902–1993)

- 谷正綱
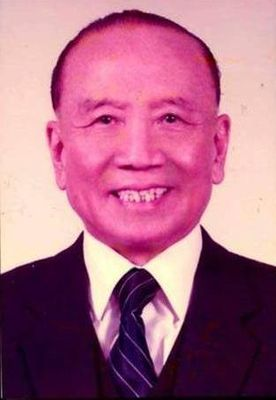

2nd secretary-general of National Assembly
- In office 10 December 1959 – June 8, 1966
- Preceded by: Hung Lan-yu
- Succeeded by: Kuo Cheng

1st chairman of World League for Freedom and Democracy
- In office 1954–1988
- Preceded by: Position established
- Succeeded by: Clement Chang

1st chairman of Chinese Association for Relief and Ensuing Services
- In office 4 April 1950 – 1989
- Preceded by: Position established
- Succeeded by: Liang Yung-chang

5th Minister of the Interior
- In office 6 February 1950 – 16 March 1950
- Premier: Yan Xishan; Chen Cheng
- Preceded by: Li Hanhun
- Succeeded by: Yu Ching-tang

1st Minister of Social Affairs
- In office 20 October 1940 – 21 March 1949
- Premier: Chiang Kai Shek; T. V. Soong; Chiang Kai Shek; Zhang Qun; Weng Wenhao; Sun Fo; He Yingqin
- Preceded by: Position established
- Succeeded by: Position abolished

Personal details
- Born: 30 April 1902 Anshun, Guizhou Province, Qing Empire
- Died: 11 December 1993 (aged 91) Taipei, Taiwan
- Party: Kuomintang
- Spouse: Wang Mai-hsiu (m. 1934)
- Children: 7, including Ku Hsiu-heng
- Relatives: Ku Cheng-lun (Brother); Ku Cheng-ting (Brother); Pi Yi-shu (Sister-in-law); Tsai Pei-Chun (Granddaughter-in-law)
- Education: University of Berlin (BPhil)

Ku Cheng-kang or Gu Zhenggang (Chinese: 谷正綱; pinyin: Gǔ Zhènggāng; 30 April 1902 – 11 December 1993) was a Chinese politician, scholar and ranking member of the Kuomintang in service to the Republic of China. He was the co-founder of both Chinese Association for Relief and Ensuing Services and World League for Freedom and Democracy and widely regarded as the "Father of Disaster Relief in the Republic of China", "Social Welfare Advocate" and the "Iron Man of Anti-Communism".

== Early life and education ==
Ku was born on 30 April 1902 in Anshun, Guizhou, during the late Qing dynasty. His brothers Ku Cheng-lun and Ku Cheng-ting and his sister-in-law Pi Yi-shu also held senior posts in the KMT and the government.

In 1922, Ku and Ku Cheng-ting went to Germany to study at the University of Berlin. Ku joined the KMT in 1924. In 1925, the brothers moved to the Soviet Union to study at Moscow Sun Yat-sen University, a Comintern school, where they were among the more than 300 students of its first intake, alongside Chiang Ching-kuo.

In 1926, as tensions grew within the First United Front, the brothers and other KMT students formed a Sun Yat-sen University branch of the Society for the Study of Sun Yat-senism, which openly criticized the Chinese Communist Party (CCP). Their activities angered students sympathetic to the CCP, and after the group was exposed, the Ku brothers and their associates were expelled and sent back to China. Global Views Monthly later described Ku as one of the students who had openly opposed the communists in Moscow.

== Early political career ==
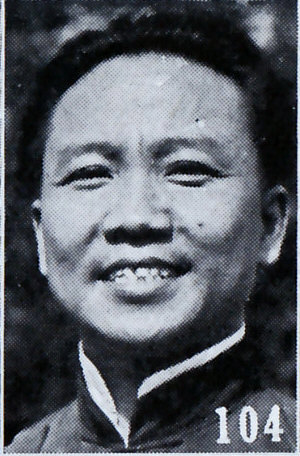
Ku Cheng-kang as pictured in The Most Recent Biographies of Chinese Dignitaries

The brothers returned to China in 1926. In May 1927, Ku became a member of the preparatory committee of the Central Political School, established under Chiang Kai-shek, and after the school opened he served as deputy director of its moral training department. Because the director, Ding Weifen, was rarely present, Ku effectively ran the department, and his skill as a speaker gave him considerable influence among the students.

On 22 November 1927, at a mass rally in Nanjing celebrating victories in the Northern Expedition, Ku, representing the Central Political School, called on the crowd to support Chiang's reinstatement and to overthrow the Central Special Committee and the Western Hills faction. When the demonstrators set out on a march, troops aligned with the Western Hills faction opened fire, causing dozens of casualties.

In 1928, the brothers joined Chen Gongbo and Ku Meng-yu in forming the Reorganization Group, a faction loyal to Wang Jingwei. During the power struggle between Chiang and Wang in 1928 and 1929, Ku opposed Chiang's consolidation of power. Chiang and his ally Chen Guofu planned to have delegates to the KMT's Third National Congress appointed by the central leadership rather than elected by local party branches, a move that critics called authoritarian.

On 14 March 1929, Ku presided over a protest rally in Nanjing under the slogan "Oppose dictatorship, oppose centrally appointed representatives", following speeches by Wang and Chen Gongbo three days earlier. Police sent by Chen Guofu broke up the rally, and Ku was reportedly beaten so badly that his life was in danger, but he was not imprisoned, reportedly because his elder brother Ku Cheng-lun was an ally of Chiang. On 25 May 1929, he published an article accusing Chiang of usurping control of the party, writing that the KMT had "become merely the instrument of warlords and bureaucrats, a conglomeration of corrupt elements".

After the Mukden Incident in 1931, Chiang sought a rapprochement with Wang's faction, and Ku was assigned to party organization work in Beiping and Tianjin. In December 1931, he was elected an alternate member of the KMT Central Executive Committee. In December 1934, he was appointed standing vice minister of the Ministry of Industry, and in 1935 he became a full member of the Central Executive Committee and its Standing Committee, as well as deputy director of the party's Organization Department. He continued to support Wang's faction during this period while toning down his earlier attacks on Chiang.

In early 1935, Ku became involved in the dispute over the Hongkong and Shanghai Banking Corporation's auction of the Shenxin No. 7 cotton mill. Although framed as a debate between laissez-faire and state-controlled economics, the dispute reflected a contest between Chiang's faction, represented by Finance Minister H. H. Kung, and Wang's faction, represented by Industry Minister Chen Gongbo. Chen proposed reorganizing the Shenxin company as a state-run enterprise, but the mill owner Rong Zongjing enlisted the senior KMT figure Wu Zhihui to oppose the plan, and it was set aside. Writing in the ministry's journal, Ku defended Chen's policy, blamed the plan's failure on Rong and "so-called party elders", criticized Shanghai bankers for preferring government bonds and property speculation to industrial lending, and called for state control of the cotton yarn trade.

== Wartime service ==
After the Second Sino-Japanese War broke out in 1937, Ku became deputy head of the Fifth Department of the Military Affairs Commission. In June 1938, he became acting secretary of the Three Principles of the People Youth Corps and a member of its central executive board, and he also headed the KMT's Zhejiang provincial party committee.

In November 1939, Ku was appointed director of the KMT's Social Affairs Department. When the department was transferred to the Executive Yuan as the Ministry of Social Affairs in October 1940, he became its minister, and he held the post until March 1949. He kept the post through successive cabinets, including that of Weng Wenhao in 1948. Ku's state-published biography credits him with laying the foundations of social welfare administration in the Republic of China, at a time when most social legislation had yet to be written. Laws promulgated during his tenure included the People's Organizations Act, the Social Relief Act, the Employment Service Act, the Child Welfare Act, the Mining and Industrial Inspection Act, the Trade Union Act and the Farmers' Association Act. According to the biography, he also set up social administration offices in rear-area and frontline provinces and encouraged communities to form production, marketing, labor, credit and consumer cooperatives.

In May 1945, at the KMT's Sixth National Congress in Chongqing, Ku submitted four social policy programs, covering national protection, rural policy, labor policy and preliminary postwar social security, as a framework for postwar reconstruction. His biography states that the congress adopted them into the party platform, and it partly credits his advocacy for the social security provisions later included in the Constitution.

In October 1947, the American consul general in Shanghai, Monnett B. Davis, reported that Ku was a strong supporter of the KMT party organization and had consistently tried to channel relief funds and supplies under his control through government outlets for the benefit of the party. That year, Ku also served on the Central Cooperative Guidance Committee chaired by Chen Lifu. He followed Chiang Kai-shek to Taiwan after the KMT's retreat in 1949.

== Career in Taiwan ==
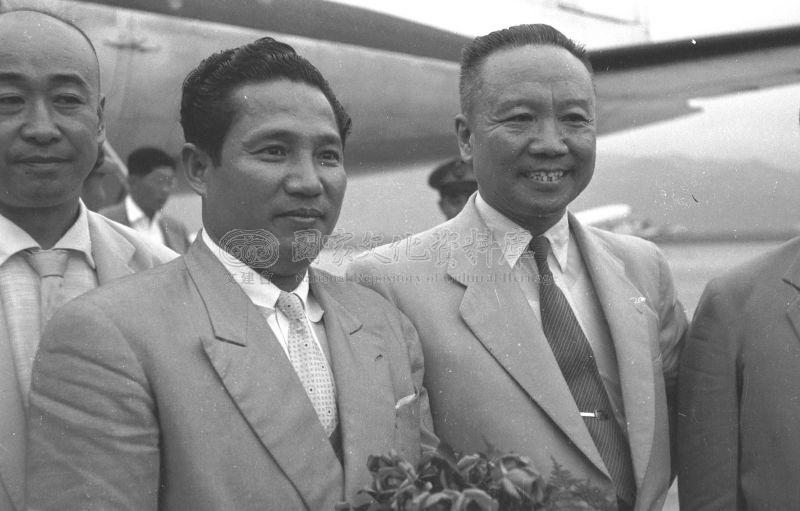
Ku with Chen Hsin at the first Asian Peoples' Anti-Communist League Council meeting, 1957

In 1950, Ku became the first minister of the interior after the government's relocation to Taiwan. During the KMT's reorganization that year, he headed the Second Department of the party's Central Reform Committee, which oversaw youth, industrial, agricultural, labor and social movements. His biography credits him with encouraging Taiwan's early labor insurance system and the creation of party branches in public and private enterprises. He chaired the Chinese Cooperative Association from 1951 to 1973.

=== Refugee relief ===
In 1950, the KMT's Central Reform Committee founded the Free China Relief Association, known in Chinese as the China Mainland Disaster Relief Association, and Ku led it for more than four decades. Besides sheltering and resettling refugees, the association carried out psychological warfare broadcasts for the government in Hong Kong and overseas. Under Ku, it handled the resettlement of Chinese prisoners of the Korean War who chose to go to Taiwan, evacuees from the Dachen Islands, ethnic Chinese from North Vietnam, refugees on the Thai border and refugees at Rennie's Mill in Hong Kong. The association was renamed the Chinese Relief Association in 2000. Together with Fang Chih, Ku also set up the Sino-Laotian Friendship Society and took part in KMT projects in South Korea, South Vietnam, Burma, Laos, Cambodia and Thailand.

=== Anti-communist leagues ===
In August 1954, Ku became the first chairman of the Republic of China chapter of the Asian Peoples' Anti-Communist League. The first conference of the World Anti-Communist League (WACL) opened in Taipei in 1967 with Ku as chairman of both the conference and the organization, and he described Taiwan as "a lighthouse of freedom in the Pacific Ocean". He became the league's honorary chairman the following year and held the title until his death.

As a WACL leader, Ku invited right-wing military figures from various countries to set up WACL chapters and organized mass anti-communist campaigns. At the annual Freedom Day rallies on 23 January, he led crowds in chanting slogans such as "Down with Communism" and "Oppose Enslavement". The writer Chen Ruixia wrote that Ku demanded personal loyalty from WACL members.

In 1985, Time reported that the WACL's Taiwan chapter, which was close to the KMT, had raised at least $100,000 for the Contras in Nicaragua, mostly from private sources. Chinese-language accounts published in 1987, during the Iran–Contra affair, stated that Ku's covert military aid to the Contras had been exposed and that the Ministry of Foreign Affairs had confirmed it.

=== National Assembly and later life ===
After Hung Lan-yu, the first secretary-general of the National Assembly, died in 1958, Chiang Kai-shek appointed Ku as his successor the following year, and Ku was formally elected in 1960. In 1966, he received the most votes, 100, in the election of the Assembly's 85-member Presidium, making him its top-ranking member. Critics argued that he had accumulated too much influence in the Assembly, and according to The Journalist, Chiang remarked that Ku "wants to run for president now".

In 1980, Ku was appointed a senior adviser to the president. He died at National Taiwan University Hospital in Taipei on 11 December 1993, at the age of 91.

== Personal life ==
Ku married Wang Mai-hsiu (c. 1907–1998), whom he met through a mutual friend, and she later served as his English translator. The couple had two daughters and five sons, including Ku Hsiu-heng, who became director of the Taiwan Cyanamid Company.

== Personality and reputation ==
Ku's biographies published by Academia Historica recount that he twice won Chiang's trust through tears. The first time was in 1939, after Wang Jingwei defected to the Japanese, when Ku, a member of Wang's Reorganization Group, wept before Chiang and declared, "I once served Wang out of loyalty to the party and the nation, now I will serve you with the same loyalty". The second time was during the Chinese Civil War, when Li Zongren pressed Chiang to step down and Ku again wept to affirm his support. The story is often retold in popular Chinese books.

According to his biography published by the Legislative Yuan, Ku kept an austere lifestyle and declined official housing for senior officials, renting modest accommodation instead. In 1964, he was reportedly sued over unpaid rent, declared bankrupt and moved to Minsheng New Village, then a rural, flood-prone area. The biography also states that he used second-hand furniture from Ku Cheng-ting and at times sold gifts, such as pens and radios from the South Korean president Park Chung-hee and the Japanese prime minister Nobusuke Kishi, to pay his children's school fees.

The same biography portrays Ku as an assertive and confrontational figure who cultivated close ties with the press and often used it to denounce political opponents. It recounts that during a trip to South America in 1985, he threw his sun hat to the ground after discovering that it had been made in mainland China.

Chen Kewen, a colleague and friend of Ku, recorded sharply critical views of him in his diary, calling him a "revolutionary ruffian" and a "party hoodlum". Chen wrote that among members of the Reorganization Group, "hardly any were satisfied with Ku, only Mr. Wang seemed to rely heavily on him", and added that he "could not understand the reason for this contradiction".

== Works ==
The following is an incomplete list of Ku's published works.

- 世盟重要文獻 (Important Documents of the World Anti-Communist League), editor. Taipei: World Anti-Communist League, China Chapter, 1967.
- 發揚胞愛精神團結反共力量 (Promoting Compatriotic Love and Uniting Anti-Communist Forces). Taipei: Free China Relief Association, 1973.
- Expose and Destroy Peiping's "Peaceful Unification" Intrigue. Taipei: World Anti-Communist League, China Chapter, 1979.
- The 12th C.C.P. Congress and the Future of Teng's Line. Taipei: World Anti-Communist League, China Chapter, 1982.
- 為人類自由而奮鬥：世盟榮譽主席谷正綱博士言論選集 (Fighting for Human Freedom: Selected Speeches of WACL Honorary Chairman Dr. Ku Cheng-kang). Editorial Committee for the Selected Speeches of Ku Cheng-kang, 1985.
