= Fang Quan =

Fang Quan (Chinese: 方荃; pinyin: Fāng Quán) (b. ? – d. 1897), courtesy name Peiqing (培卿), was a late Qing Empire Mandarin, scholar, author and educator.

== Biography ==
Fang Quan was born in Tongcheng County, Anhui during the late-Qing Empire. He was a descendant of Fang Bao, the founder of the Tongcheng School of literary prose of which Fang Quan was also an adherent. He was the uncle of Fang Chih, a Kuomintang official and diplomat.

Fang served the Qing Empire rising to the rank of Prefect in the Mandarin system. He was granted the post of Prefect over Xingyi in Zhenyuan County, Guizhou which had a high population of Miao people. The region was prominent in contemporary Qing affairs due to the Panthay Rebellion which was successfully suppressed by Qing generals Ma Rulong and Cen Yuying with aid from the British and French Empires.

In the late 1800s, Fang returned to Tongcheng to oversee the establishment of the Huabiao Primary School (zh: 华表小学), serving for a time as its principal.

He died in Tongcheng County in 1897.
