= Ge (surname) =

Chinese surname

葛
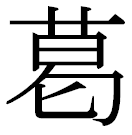

Other names
- See also: Zhuge (諸葛)

Ge (Chinese: 葛; pinyin: Gě) is a surname of Chinese origin. One branch of the family became the compound surname Zhuge. In 2013 it was found to be the 110th most common surname, composed of 1.95 million people or 0.150% of the total national population, with the province with the largest population being Jiangsu. It is the 44th name on the Hundred Family Surnames poem.

== Notable people ==
- Ge Yunfei (Chinese: 葛云飞; born 1789, died 1841), Chinese General of the Qing Dynasty who served in the First Opium War
- Ge Hongsheng (Chinese: 葛洪升 1931–2020), Chinese politician
- Ge Tian (Chinese: 葛天; pinyin: Gě Tiān; born 1988) Chinese actress and fashion model
- Ge Xiaoguang (born 1953), Chinese artist
- Christine Ko (born 1988) a Taiwanese-American actress
- Ko Yu-chin (Chinese: 葛雨琴; born 1939), Taiwanese politician
- Ernest Shiu-Jen Kuh (Chinese: 葛守仁; pinyin: Gě Shǒurén; 1928–2015) was a Chinese-born American electrical engineer

=== Stagenames ===
- Grace Chang (born 1933), known by her stagename as Ge Lan (葛蘭), Hong Kong-Chinese actress and singer
