= Yu Guanglang =

Yu Guanglang 余光烺
- Born: 1897; Qing Empire
- Died: 1980 (aged 82–83); People's Republic of China
- Other name: 余光烺
- Political party: Chinese Communist Party

Yu Guanglang (Chinese: 余光烺; pinyin: Yú Guānglǎng) (b. 1897 - d. 1980) was a Chinese politician and scholar who served the Chinese Communist Party.

== Early life and family origins ==
Yu was born in 1897 in Tongcheng, Anhui Province during the late Qing dynasty. He grew up without his father and was raised largely by his siblings. He attended the Tongcheng Secondary School which was notable for its creation of many political and revolutionary figures of the period.

== Biography ==
After graduating from Tongcheng Secondary School, Yu went to Japan and then the United States to continue his education in a work-study program.

In the 17th year of the founding of the Republic of China (1928), he returned to China where he became a mathematics professor at Nanking University. Due to his schoolboy connections to Fang Chih, a government official, he was offered various positions within the Kuomintang government but declined to accept them. These refusals soon alienated Yu from the ruling party and he gradually became active in the Communist underground to whom Yu offered his house for the purpose of holding secret meetings. The Kuomintang Secret Police eventually had Yu listed as a Communist spy. Further career promotions for Yu were blacklisted and his activities were monitored by authorities.

After the fall of Nanking to the Communist forces, Yu became an influential figure in the field of education with the new Communist government. He went on to become a member of the Jiangsu Province Political Consultative Conference Standing Committee and the deputy director of the Nanjing NLD student organization.
