= Flowers of Freedom =

Political song in China and Hong Kong

"Flower of Freedom" (Chinese: 自由花) is a song created to support the Hong Kong Alliance in Support of Patriotic Democratic Movements of China (HKASPDMC). The composer of the song is Thomas Chow, and he used the melody of the song "Sailor" (水手) by Taiwanese singer Zheng Zhihua. Generally, the song is known as a tribute to the 1989 Tiananmen Square protests and massacre.

== Original song ==
"Sailor" recounts Zheng Zhi-Hua's experience with polio. After performing it on China Central Television in 1992, the song became a household name across mainland China.

== History ==
The term "自由花" (flowers of freedom) has existed in Chinese for a very long time. Hong Yi wrote a poem before 1905 stating, “Freedom blooms for eight thousand years, and true freedom never dies" (自由花开八千春，是真自由能不死). In mainland China, some also trace the origin of 自由花 to the line "today we seek righteousness and virtue; across the land, the flower of freedom blooms" (取义成仁今日事，人间遍种自由花) from Chen Yi's 1936 work "梅岭三章". In 1931, Chinese Communist Party member Wang Buwen declared before his execution: "Let my blood water the flower of freedom!" (让我的鲜血去浇灌自由之花吧！)

Following the 1989 Tiananmen Square protests, in 1993 HKASPDMC members demanded Wang Xizhe's release and hummed the chorus of "Sailor" at a press conference; they later requested Thomas Chow to rewrite the lyrics.

Mainly before the Hong Kong National Security Law took effect in 2020, Hong Kong sang "Flowers of Freedom" in the evening of 4 June every year at Victoria Park, where candlelight vigils commemorating the 1989 Tiananmen Square protests. The song was also often sung during the 2014 Hong Kong Umbrella Revolution.
