= Fu Peirong =

Taiwanese writer, philosopher (born 1950)

Fu Peirong (傅佩榮; born December 16, 1950) is a scholar, writer, educator and philosopher from Taiwan. He uses pen names Fu Hua and Fu Xuan. He was born in Kaohsiung and grew up in Taoyuan, with ancestral roots in Shanghai. He is a retired professor and former director of the Department of Philosophy and the Institute of Philosophy at National Taiwan University. He held positions as a visiting professor at the University of Louvain in Belgium and Leiden University in the Netherlands. He also served as the editor-in-chief of the monthly journal Philosophy and Culture, the chief editor of Dawn Culture Company, and the editor-in-chief of the magazine Philosophy.

Fu Peirong has authored numerous books and essays on Eastern and Western philosophy for the popular readers. His writings span various fields including Confucianism, Taoism, Western philosophy, the Book of Changes (Yijing) divination, and many others. He excels at translating traditional ideas into modern philosophy that contemporary audiences can easily digest. He frequently delivers public speeches and advocates for a slightly modified interpretation of the Confucian principle which posits "human nature tends toward goodness."

== Life and career ==
=== Family ===
Fu Peirong was born in a family practicing Catholicism across three generations. Both of his parents were natives of Shanghai. His father worked for the customs department and as a lighthouse keeper after relocating to Taiwan. There are seven siblings in the family.

=== Education ===
Fu Peirong was born in 1950 in Kaohsiung and lived in Taoyuan during his childhood. After primary school, he enrolled in a Catholic secondary school. He suffered from stuttering since grade two which led to feelings of low-esteem, but it has also motivated him to work harder on his schoolwork. During high school, he attended correction class at the suggestion of a teacher, and gradually improved his speech. Building on his religious beliefs, Fu Peirong embarked on the study of philosophy integrating Confucian thought.

In 1968, Fu enrolled in the philosophy major at Fu Jen Catholic University. In his third year, he started translating American philosophy textbooks, which sparked his interest in Western philosophy. While studying abroad, he kept translating and finished over two million words, greatly improving his writing skills.

In 1972, he was admitted to the Master's program in philosophy at National Taiwan University, where he shared a desk with Chin Kung. Inspired by the Neo-Confucian master Fang Dongmei, he began to develop an interest in Chinese philosophy. He published his first translated work From God to Man (从上帝到人).

=== Academic career ===
In 1973, he was appointed teaching assistant in the Department of Philosophy at National Taiwan University. Subsequently, he served as the chief editor of the monthly magazine Philosophy and Culture.

In 1976, he obtained a Master's degree in philosophy from National Taiwan University. His master's thesis was titled "The Absurd Concept of Camus."

In 1978, after completing his Master's degree and military service, he returned to his alma mater, National Taiwan University, to teach in the Department of Philosophy.

In 1980, he won the Harvard–Yenching Scholarship and went to Yale University in the United States to pursue a Ph.D. in religious philosophy. During his doctoral studies, he took classes from Louis Dupré and received guidance from the eminent historian Yu Ying-shih. In 1984, he obtained his doctoral degree and returned to the Department of Philosophy at National Taiwan University, where he was promoted to associate professor.

In 1985, he won the National Literary Award for his work "Successful Life." He first introduced the theory of "Human nature as tending toward goodness: A Reflection on Classical Confucianism" in the journal Philosophy and Culture.

In 1986, his work "The Origin of Confucianism and Daoism" (a revised Chinese version of his doctoral dissertation) won the Zhong Zheng Culture Award. He lectured as a visiting professor at the University of Louvain in Belgium on Confucianism. Additionally, he was voted as one of the top ten introductory professors at National Taiwan University by Min Sheng Bao.

In 1988, he was promoted to professor with the publication of the book Communication between Confucianism and Christianity.

In 1991, he served as the Dean of the Department of Philosophy and the Director of the Graduate Institute of Philosophy at National Taiwan University for three years. He was awarded the "Teaching Excellence Award" by the Ministry of Education. His course "Philosophy and Life" was voted the best general education course by student associations. The videos of his lectures on the National Taiwan University General Education Network have also garnered millions of views.

In 1992, he co-founded the Philosophy Journal with his friend, Professor Shen Qingsong from the University of Toronto in Canada, and they ran it together for a total of nine years.

In 2005, in honor of his late mentor, Fang Dongmei, who was a professor in the Master's program in the Department of Philosophy at National Taiwan University, he edited the revised edition of The Collected Works of Fang Dongmei. This series was the most comprehensive collection of Fang’s teachings.

=== Later career ===
Starting 2006, Fu Peirong began promoting Chinese classical studies in mainland China. He published five interpretative works on The Analects, Mencius, Laozi, Zhuangzi, and The Book of Changes in Beijing. Subsequently, he was invited to give a series of lectures on Chinese classical studies at Zhejiang University, Fudan University, Renmin University of China, Tsinghua University, Beijing University, Beijing Normal University, and the Chinese Academy of Social Sciences. He also appeared on the "New Apricot Forum" as a lecturer at Shandong Television.

In 2008, he gave lectures on "The Sky of Chinese Studies" at Phoenix Television in Hong Kong. In the same year, he was selected as a prominent cultural figure of the year by 21st Century Business Herald.

In 2009, he began hosting the program "The Wisdom of Mencius" on CCTV's Lecture Room. He also started hosting programs on Beijing Television, Shanghai Television, Dragon Television, and other television stations. Additionally, he promoted Chinese classical studies in universities across Mainland China, Taiwan, and Hong Kong. In 2011 alone, he gave over a hundred lectures.

In 2016, he retired from the Department of Philosophy at National Taiwan University. Upon invitation from the Ministry of Education in mainland China, he delivered a series of eight lectures on The Analects, eight lectures on Mencius, and five lectures on The Book of Changes for the "Chinese Classics Resources Library" program, which serves as an essential educational resources for middle school teachers and students in mainland China.

He delivered lectures on Western philosophy via the Dedao (得到) app and taught courses on Laozi, The Book of Changes, The Analects, Mencius, and other subjects on the audiobook app Himalaya.

== Views and thoughts ==
In 1985, Fu Peirong proposed the theory of "Human nature as tending toward goodness", contrary to the Confucian doctrine of "Inherent Goodness of Human Nature" as interpreted by Zhu Xi.

In contrast to conventional scholars who primarily engage within academic circles, Fu established himself as a prominent figure by delivering lectures to the general public in schools, temples, institutions, and associations. He perceived a duty to animate the figures of Confucius and Mencius, as he viewed them as genuine personalities whose teachings were enriched with real-life experiences.
