= Zhu Guangqian =

Chinese scholar and theoretician of aesthetics

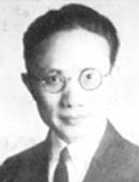
- Zhu Guangqian in 1933.
- Born: 19 September 1897; Anhui, China
- Died: 6 March 1986 (aged 88); Beijing, China
- Education: University of Hong Kong; University of Edinburgh; University College, London; University of Paris; University of Strasbourg

Zhu Guangqian (朱光潛; 19 September 1897 – 6 March 1986) was a scholar and theoretician of aesthetics in 20th-century China.

== History ==
Zhu was born in Tongcheng, Anhui in 1897 and graduated from the Anhui Province Tongcheng Secondary School. After earning his BA from Hong Kong University in 1922, he went abroad to study aesthetics at the University of Edinburgh and University College, London. He moved to France in 1931 and studied at the University of Strasbourg, where he earned his doctorate in 1933. Later, he returned to China to write The Psychology of Art (文藝心理學), On Poetry (詩論), and A History of Western Aesthetics (西方美學史), Letters on Beauty (談美書簡).

In the 1930s in Beijing, Zhu Guangqian hosted a literary salon that met monthly to recite prose and poetry, east and west. Regulars included Wen Yiduo (聞一多), Chen Mengjia (陳夢家), Zhu Ziqing (朱自清), Zheng Zhenduo (鄭振鐸), Feng Zhi (馮至), Shen Congwen (沈從文), Bing Xin (冰心), Ling Shuhua (淩淑華), Bian Zhilin (卞之琳), Lin Huiyin (林徽因) and Xiao Qian (蕭乾). These were pivotal figures in Republican literature, and it can perhaps be argued that the salon was important to the formation of the so-called Beijing style literature (京派文學) of the period.

Zhu was one of the earliest post-Cultural Revolution Chinese proponents of Marxist humanism and "aesthetic humanism," many of whom had previously been persecuted for their humanist writings.

== Portrait ==
- Zhu Guangqian. A Portrait by Kong Kai Ming at Portrait Gallery of Chinese Writers (Hong Kong Baptist University Library)
