= FCRA =

FCRA may refer to:

- Fair Credit Reporting Act, United States
- Foreign Contribution (Regulation) Act, 2010, India
- Free China Relief Association, now the Chinese Association for Relief and Ensuing Services, Taiwan
