= Thomé H. Fang =

Chinese philosopher

- Born: February 9, 1899
- Died: July 13, 1977 (aged 78)
- Occupation: Chinese philosopher

Thomé H. Fang (Chinese: 方東美; pinyin: Fāng Dōngměi, 1899–1977) was a Chinese philosopher. He was described by Charles A. Moore as the "greatest philosopher of China" and by Vincent Shen as "one of the most creative contemporary Chinese philosophers."

== Biography ==
Thomé H. Fang was born on 9 February 1899 (according to the Lunar Calendar) of a family in Tongcheng, Anhui, China, that was known for producing prominent scholars, thinkers, and men of letters in Chinese classics, including several Royal Tutors at the Imperial Palace during the Ming and Qing Dynasties (such as Fang Gongcheng, Fang Guancheng, etc.). Thomé H. Fang was the 16th generation descendant of Fang Bao, a Qing dynasty scholar and one of the founders of the Tongcheng School, and a relative of his contemporary Fang Chih, a Chinese diplomat. He was taught the Chinese classics while he was young, and later studied at Jinlin University in Nanjing, where he took courses from John Dewey on ancient Western philosophy. He attended the University of Wisconsin, Madison, and completed an MA in philosophy and pursued a doctorate comparing British and American realism.

From 1925 to 1948, Thomé H. Fang taught at several universities in China, mostly at the National Central University (later renamed Nanjing University and reinstated in Taiwan), in Nanjing and Chongqing. Then he taught at National Taiwan University.

== Works ==
- Chinese Philosophy: Its Spirit and Its Development, Linking Publishing Co., Ltd, Taipei, 1981, 1986
- The Chinese View of Life: The Philosophy of Comprehensive Harmony, Linking Publishing Co., Ltd., Taipei, 1980, 1981, 1986
- Creativity in Man and Nature: A Collection of Philosophical Essays, Linking Publishing Co., Ltd., Taipei, 1980, 1983
- Chinese Philosophy: Its Spirit and Its Development, Linking Publishing Co., Ltd., Taipei, 1981, 1981, 1986
- Philosophy of Life, Creativity, and Inclusiveness,
- Three Types of Philosophical Wisdom (Zhexue san hui-哲學三慧), 重慶版時事新報學燈,26 June 1983.
- Primordial Confucianism and Taoism (Yuan Shi Ru Jia Dao Jia Zhe Xue-原始儒家道家哲學), Taipei, 1983.
- Chinese Mahayana Buddhism (Chung Guo Da Zheng Fo Xue-中國大乘佛學), Taipei, 1984.
- Neo-Confucianism in Sung, Ming and Ch'ing Periods (Xin Ru Jia Zhe Xue shipa jiang-新儒家哲學十八講)), Taipei, 1983.
