= Ku Cheng-lun =

Chinese General (1889-1953)

- 谷正倫
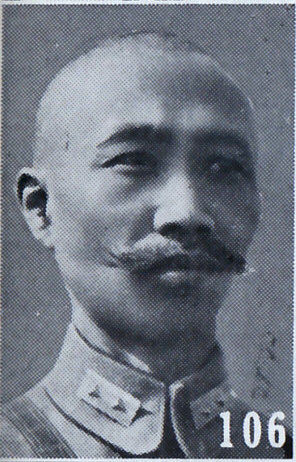
- Ku Cheng-lun as pictured in The Most Recent Biographies of Chinese Dignitaries

Governor of Guizhou
- In office 1948–1949
- Preceded by: Yang Sen
- Succeeded by: Yang Yong (general)

Governor of Gansu
- In office 1940–1946
- Preceded by: Zhu Shaoliang
- Succeeded by: Kuo Chi-chiao

Personal details
- Born: 1889 Anshun, Guizhou Province, Qing Empire
- Died: 1953 (aged 63–64) Taipei, Taiwan
- Party: Kuomintang
- Relations: Ku Cheng-kang (Brother); Ku Cheng-ting (Brother); Pi Yi-shu (Sister-in-law)

Ku Cheng-lun (simplified Chinese: 谷正伦; traditional Chinese: 谷正倫; pinyin: Gǔ Zhènglún; 1889–1953) was a Republic of China lieutenant general who served as commander of the Military Police, governor of Gansu and Guizhou, acting mayor of Nanjing, Minister of Food, and National Policy Advisor to the President. He was widely regarded as the "Father of the Republic of China Military Police" (中華民國憲兵之父).

Ku was a member of the Kuomintang and the elder brother of Ku Cheng-kang and Ku Cheng-ting.
