= Namyang Gal clan =

Korean clan from Gyeonggi Province

- Country: Korea
- Current region: Hwaseong, Gyeonggi
- Founder: Jegal Hyeong
- Connected members: Kal So-won

Namyang Gal clan (Korean: 남양 갈씨; Hanja: 南陽 葛氏) was one of the Korean clans. Their Bon-gwan was in Hwaseong, Gyeonggi, Gyeonggi Province. According to the research in 2015, the number of Namyang Gal clan was 453. They were separated from Zhuge clan (Hanja: 諸葛氏). Zhuge clan (Hanja: 諸葛氏)’s founder was Zhuge Gui, father of Zhuge Liang. Jegal Gongsun (Hanja: 諸葛公巡), 20th descendant of Zhuge Gui, was naturalized in Silla during Heungdeok of Silla’s reign. Two brothers, Jegal Hong (Hanja: 諸葛泓) and Jegal Hyeong, divided the Jegal clan (Hanja: 諸葛氏) into Je clan (Hanja: 諸氏) and Gal clan (Hanja: 葛氏). Jegal Hong (Hanja: 諸葛泓), the elder brother, used the surname, Je (Hanja: 諸氏), and Jegal Hyeong, the younger brother, used the surname, Gal (Hanja: 葛氏). Jegal Hyeong became the founder of the Namyang Gal clan.

== See also ==
- Korean clan names of foreign origin
