= Nanjing National Theatre Academy =

Former theater school in Nanjing, China

The Nanjing National Theatre Academy, also known as the National Drama School or the National Theatre Academy (zh: 南京国立戏剧专科学校 or 国立戏剧学校 or 国立戏剧专科学校) was a Drama school in the Republic of China and the first institute of higher education in the field of drama in China.

== History ==
The Nanjing National Theatre Academy was founded in the fall of 1935 by Fang Chih as an organ of the KMT Central Propaganda Department. Fang, working on behalf of the CC Clique, a powerful faction of the Kuomintang, envisioned the school as China's first ever institute of higher education in the field of drama espousing the principals of the New Life Movement. The New Life Movement was the brainchild of General Chiang Kai-shek and his wife Soong Mei-ling with the backing of the Blue Shirts Society, the KMT's extreme right wing.

The original campus was located at the southeast corner of the intersection of Sanyong Lane (zh: 双龙巷) and the Nanjing Drum Tower.

== War ==
With the outbreak of World War II, the school moved briefly to Changsha and then to Chongqing. In 1938 or 1939, the school moved to Jiang County, Sichuan Province. In 1940, the name of the school was changed to the National Theatre College (zh: 国立戏剧专科学校) as a branch of the Ministry of Education where Fang Chih was the Chairman of the Transitional National Government Committee. In 1945, the school again relocated briefly to Chungking where Fang was the municipality's party chief before being relocated permanently to Nanjing.

After the fall of the Kuomintang government in the Chinese Civil War, the Nanjing Theatre Academy merged with the drama department of the Lu Xun Art Academy to form the Central Academy of Drama by order of Mao Zedong. Today, the Central Academy of Drama is one of the most prestigious drama school in the PRC together with the Beijing Film Academy and the Shanghai Theatre Academy. The school was relocated to Beijing in April 1950 where it was renamed under the Central Academy of Drama with Ouyang Yuqian acting as the first school president.
