= Nie Yanghua =

Chinese politician

Nie Yanghua (Chinese: 聂仰华) was a Chinese politician. Although she was initially among the first group of women elected to the Legislative Yuan in 1948, her election was subsequently declared invalid.

== Biography ==
Originally from Pingshan County in Sichuan province, Nie graduated from the Law School at Sichuan University in 1934. She became a teacher, teaching in Chengdu Xiejin Middle School, Jichuan Middle School, Jianguo Middle School and Chongqing Jingye Commercial School.

Nie was an independent candidate in Sichuan province in the 1948 elections for the Legislative Yuan. She finished in the top five places reserved for women, but her election was overturned, as although she had registered as an independent candidate, the sixth-placed candidate Pi Yi-shu provided evidence that Nie has had joined the Kuomintang while at university. Pi entered parliament in her place.

In 1950 she relocated to Beijing, where she studied in the Political Research Institute of North China Revolutionary University. After graduating in 1951, she worked for the All-China Women's Federation. She later worked for a newspaper clipping service set up by Renmin University of China, retiring in 1963.
