= Low-Key Club =

Chinese political group

The Low-Key Club (Chinese: 低調俱樂部; pinyin: Dīdiào Jùlèbù) was a pacifist group composed of a faction of party, government, military, and academic elites from the Nanjing Nationalist Government prior to and during the early stages of the Second Sino-Japanese War. They were dissatisfied with the prevailing "hysteria" that promoted war against Japan and emphasized China's inability to effectively counter Japan's military power.

== Members ==
- Carsun Chang
- Chen Lifu
- Cheng Tsang-po
- Gao Zongwu
- Gu Zhutong
- Hu Shih
- Li Huang
- Luo Junqiang
- Mei Siping
- Wang Jingwei
- Xiong Shihui
- Zhang Dongsun
- Zhou Fohai
- Zhu Shaoliang
