= Yao Nai =

Chinese scholar (1731–1815)

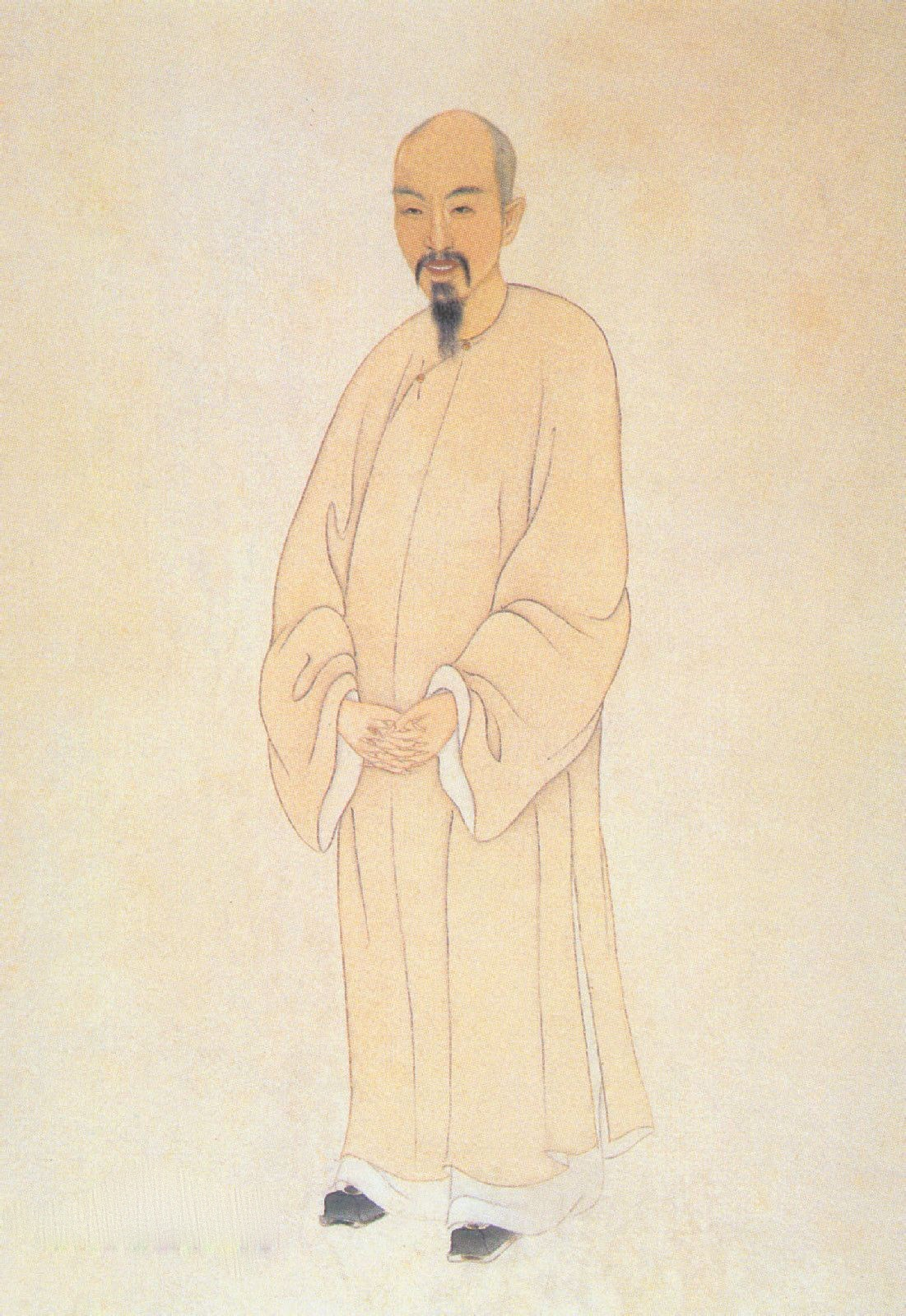
Yao Nai

Yao Nai (姚鼐, pinyin: Yáo Nài; 1731–1815) was a scholar of the Qing Dynasty.

Born in Tongcheng (桐城), Anhui province, Yao Nai achieved the degree of Jinshi in 1763, and was appointed to the Hanlin Academy (翰林院). Later, he worked as official of several central administrative departments. Yao Nai was famous of his classical works (古文) and considered as a main figure of Tongcheng School.

== Historian ==
Yao Nai was the first to point out the numerological outlay as a stylistic feature of the Warring States texts. Considering abundance of such features in the Yizhoushu, he expressed doubts in authenticity of this corpus, since the repetitiveness of such textual presentation did not agree with his perception of the "former kings' wisdom".
