= Fang Chih =

Kuomintang politician (1895–1989)

Coordinates: 26°26′47″N 127°48′19″E

- 方治
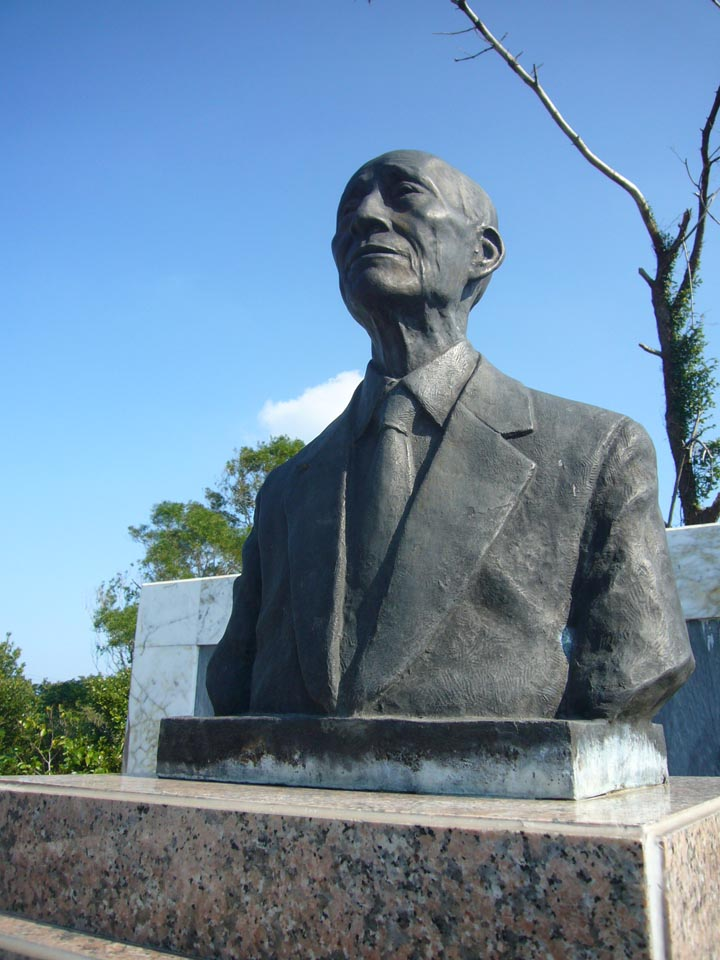
- The memorial to Fang Chih at Okinawa.

Chairman of Fuchien Province
- In office 1927–1929
- President: Chiang Kai-shek
- Governor: Sa Zhenbing; Yang Shu-chuang

Chairman of Anhui Province
- In office 1927–1929
- President: Chiang Kai-shek
- Governor: Ch'en Tiao-yuan; Han Kuo-chun

Chairman of Qingdao Municipality
- In office 1927–1929 Serving with Ma Fuxiang (Mayor)
- President: Chiang Kai-shek
- Succeeded by: Chen Tiao-yuan

Acting Minister of Information of the Republic of China
- In office 1930–1937
- President: Chiang Kai-shek

Commissioner of Education for Anhui and Hubei Province
- In office 1938–1939
- President: Chiang Kai-shek
- Governor: Liao Lei (Anhui)

Chairman of the Transitional National Government Committee of the Ministry of Education
- In office 1940–1940
- President: Chiang Kai-shek

Chairman of Chongqing Municipality
- In office 1941–1946 Serving with Zhang Dulun (Mayor)
- President: Chiang Kai-shek

Chairman of Shanghai Municipality
- In office 1946 – 25 May 1949 Serving with K. C. Wu (Mayor)
- President: Chiang Kai-shek
- Preceded by: Wu Shao-hsu
- Succeeded by: City taken by communists Chen Yi

Secretary General & Acting Governor of Fuchien Province and Chairman of Fuchien
- In office May 1949 – 23 November 1949 (From Kinmen after 17 August 1949)
- President: Chiang Kai-shek
- Governor: Zhu Shaoliang; Hu Lien
- Preceded by: Zhu Shaoliang
- Succeeded by: Huang Jintao

Secretary General & Chairman of the Free China Relief Association
- In office 1949–1972
- President: Chiang Kai-shek
- Preceded by: Organization Founded
- Succeeded by: Ku Cheng-kang

President of the Sino-Ryukyuan Cultural and Economic Association
- In office 1958–1988
- Preceded by: Organization Founded
- Succeeded by: David Chang Hsi-cheh

Founder and Trustee of the Sino-Laotian Economic and Cultural Association
- In office 27 August 1959 – 1988
- Preceded by: Organization Founded

Personal details
- Born: 23 November 1895 Tongcheng, Zongyang County, Anhui Province, Qing Empire
- Died: 28 March 1989 (aged 93) Taipei, Taiwan Province, Republic of China
- Resting place: Onna Village, Kunigami District, Okinawa Prefecture, Kyushu, Japan
- Citizenship: Republic of China
- Party: Kuomintang
- Education: Tokyo Higher Normal School; Tokyo Imperial University

Military service
- Allegiance: Republic of China
- Branch/service: National Revolutionary Army
- Rank: Secretary General; Chief Executive
- Unit: Beijing-Hangzhou Garrison Corps, General Headquarters; Beijing-Shanghai Garrison Corps, General Headquarters
- Battles/wars: World War II; Chinese Civil War: Fall of Shanghai, Guningtou; Korean War; Burma Campaign

Fang Chih

Chinese name
- Chinese: 方治
Transcriptions
Standard Mandarin
- Hanyu Pinyin: Fāng Zhì
- Wade–Giles: Fang^{1} Chih^{4}

Japanese name
- Kanji: 方治

Fang Chih (Chinese: 方治; 23 November 1895 – 28 March 1989), courtesy name Xikong (希孔), was a politician, provincial governor, diplomat, author and a high-ranking Kuomintang official of the Republic of China.

== Family history and early life ==
Fang Chih was born into the prominent Tongcheng Fang clan in Tongcheng, Anhui, Qing empire in November 1895. His father was Fang Rong (Chinese: 方蓉; pinyin: Fāng Róng, courtesy name: 方镜卿), the middle son of Fang Lanfen, a Qing dynasty author. He is a direct descendant of Fang Zhipu (方至朴) and Fang Zhenru (方震孺), an early Qing scholar, author, magistrate and Governor of Guangxi Province. He was also a descendant of Fang Bao, a distinguished Qing author who founded the Tongcheng school of literary prose.

His paternal uncles were Fang Quan, a late Qing dynasty era prefect and Fang Zao (Chinese: 方藻; pinyin: Fāng Zǎo, courtesy name: 方澄卿). Fang's father died when he was 1 or 2 years old in 1896 and his mother sent him to be raised by his paternal uncle Fang Quan and paternal grandfather.

== Education ==
Fang Chih graduated from Anhui Province Tongcheng Secondary School (安徽省桐城中学), known as a producer of many revolutionary Anhui leaders, which he attended alongside Zhang Bojun, Wu Zipei (吴子培), and Yu Guanglang among other notable classmates. Due to the hostility between the Beiyang government regime and the KMT, many of the KMT families moved into exile in Japan and Chiang Kai-shek's Northern Expedition defeated Beiyang by 1928. In 1919, with financial support from his uncle, Fang Peiqing (方培卿), Fang Chi went to Tokyo, Japan where he learned Japanese and pursued his studies at the Tokyo Higher Normal School and the Tokyo Imperial University. On 14 July 1925, Fang married Masue Ueki (Chinese: 方益之; pinyin: Fāng Yìzhī; Wade–Giles: Fang I-chih), a Japanese woman, fellow Kuomintang member and classmate at the Tokyo Imperial University studying dentistry. He would graduate with a master's degree from the College of Arts and Science at Tokyo Imperial University in 1927.

Whilst at school, Fang was involved in the leadership structure of the KMT student groups active in Japan in the Chinese student community. These groups were founded by the Tongmenghui clique cemented in Japan by Wang Jingwei. The KMT student organization was set up in the Kanda district where a Chinese communist group was already active at the Tokyo YMCA. Specifically, Fang was involved in countering Communist propaganda and student groups run by Japanese educated Chinese Communists such as Shi Qian (史迁), Wang Buwen, Tong Changrong, Yu Dahua (余大化) and Fang Bin at the Hubei Railway School of Tokyo or the Tokyo Railway Specialized School, a school set up by Zhang Zhidong for Chinese international students whose graduates went on to serve in the railway industry at Hubei for 6 years.

== Return from Japan ==
Fang Chih returned from Japan in 1927. After his return, he joined the Northern Expedition of Chiang Kai-shek working in Hubei, Jiangxi, Hunan and Hubei Provinces where he gained the attention of General Chiang. He was made the Chairman of the Fujian Provincial Party Headquarters of the KMT at the suggestion of a fellow Japanese educated classmate Dai Chuanxian with Chiang's approval. This role was expanded to oversee the KMT Chairmanship of Anhui Provincial Party Headquarters and that of Qingdao. Whilst in Anhui, Fang Chi led a political purge of the local party together with Shao Hua on the orders of Chen Lifu, founder of the CC Clique or the Central Club Clique and head of the Central Bureau of Investigation and Statistics of the Central Committee. The purge mechanism in Anhui later swept up his former rival and classmate from Japan, Wang Buwen who was arrested in April 1931 and executed the following month. His work during this period was focused primarily in Hubei, Jiangxi, Qingdao, Nanjing, Hunan, Anhui and Fujian provinces in various military, political, party affairs and education related jobs.

His organizational skills and writing ability soon gained the attention of Chen Lifu, with whom he regularly corresponded. The connection with Chen Lifu aligned Fang with the CC Clique faction of the KMT and led to his increased involvement in the operations of the Bureau of Investigation and Statistics. By March 1929, he was promoted to Chief Secretary of the Department of Propaganda of the Central Committee by Shao Yuanchong who was one of four people responsible for the lyrics of the National Anthem of the Republic of China. He was posted to Nanjing and Shanghai. In 1930, he was acting Minister of Information and by September 1931, he was promoted to the Chief Secretary of the Publicity Committee.

== Information Ministry activities ==
In the early 1930s, rumors in Shanghai began spreading of an assassination list compiled by a secretive KMT group that became collectively known as the Blue Shirts Society. By 1933, these rumors began to come into the mainstream Shanghai press, particularly due to articles printed in the left leaning China Forum published by American radical Harold Isaacs. On 20 July 1933, due to the perceived negative public perception, Fang published an article in the Shanghai Evening Post and Mercury denouncing the rumors and the existence of the Blue Shirts saying "No Blue Shirts; No (death) list, its all wrong."

In fact, the Central Bureau of Investigation and Statistics, the CC Clique's counterintelligence organ was heavily involved in myriad kill or capture missions in Shanghai during this period. In 1929, Zhou Enlai returned to Shanghai, after a brief period of exile following the 1927 Shanghai Massacre, to set up the Communist response to the KMT called the "Special Service Section of the Central Committee" or "Teke" (中央特科). This led to a bloodbath culminating in the summer of 1931 with a full blown purge and the second flight of Zhou Enlai from the city.

In April 1931, KMT agents arrested Gu Shunzhang in Wuhan. Gu was one of Zhou's Aides of Security Affairs and his interrogation and subsequent defection from the Communists yielded to the Nationalists the entire scope of Zhou's operations in Shanghai and beyond. On 21 June 1931, Gu's entire section of the Special Service was either captured or fled with 24 arrested including his superior and General Secretary Xiang Zhongfa in Shanghai and Cai Hesen in Hong Kong. Xiang was quickly executed after his interrogation and the resulting windfall of information led the KMT to conduct an even greater purge of the Communist intelligence networks. The scope of this purge was put at around 3,000 Communists by the French Intelligence Bureau of the Shanghai French Concession and lasted until at least 1934 as the Communists from Jiangxi attempted to reestablish networks in Guangzhou and Shanghai under Chen Geng and Deng Zhongxia. Deng and Chen were both arrested though only Deng was executed as Chen had saved Chiang Kai-shek's life during a previous battle against the Warlord Chen Jiongming.

Gu Shunzhang was executed in Suzhou in December 1934 or June 1935.

By 1935, the counterintelligence situation had quieted down with most of the Communist networks significantly weakened. Fang was an elected to become a member of the Kuomintang Central Executive Committee, attending the Kuomintang 5th National Congress in November where he was confirmed as Deputy Minister of Propaganda. He was also transferred again, this time to Qingdao Municipality and served as the KMT Chairman of the region.

== CC Clique ==
As Deputy Minister of Propaganda in the period leading up to war with Japan between 1931 and 1937, Fang began to focus his activities on exploiting what he perceived to be a growing division between a majority of the Japanese population being largely desirous of peace and a minority of pro-militant actors supporting an invasion of China policy embedded in high places within the Japanese government since the tenure of Tanaka Giichi as Prime Minister and headed contemporarily by Prime Minister Hideki Tojo. In around 1935, Fang organized a daily radio broadcast in Japanese operating from two pseudo official Japanese stations located in Fukuoka and Nagasaki respectively. The messages conveyed were on the mutual destruction that war would bring to both nations, the shared history and culture between Japan and the ROC.

The broadcasts ceased after a serious diplomatic incident between Japan and the ROC ensued following a party at the Japanese Consulate General in Nanjing where Deputy Foreign Minister and Foreign Affairs Secretary and Wang Jingwei loyalist Tang Youren let slip that the radio program was being run under Fang's supervision. Once the information reached Tokyo, the Japanese government issued the ROC an ultimatum to either extradite both Fang and his wife to Japan or a Japanese battleship would be dispatched from Shanghai to Nanjing to raid the KMT Headquarters. In response, KMT Secretary General Yeh Chucang requested that Fang terminate the program. The matter was deferred to Chiang Kai-shek who decided to stop the broadcasts but moved to protect Fang. He also asserted that any incursions into the Nanjing area by Japanese naval forces would be met with force. On 1 November 1935, Wang Jingwei stepped down from his post when he was shot at by a sniper in an assassination attempt just before the 5th National Congress. Tang Youren was relieved of his duties as Deputy Foreign Affairs Minister in early December 1935 and transferred to become Vice Minister at the Ministry of Transport and Communications. He was assassinated in Shanghai on 25 December 1935 before assuming his new role.

Fang attended the Second National Motion-Picture Conference which was convened by the Central Party Publicity Committee in Shanghai. Fang used the motion picture industry in Shanghai to promote KMT party ideals to the people. These propagated the ideas of the New Life Movement which was the brainchild of General Chiang Kai-shek and his wife Soong Mei-ling and was supported by the CC Clique and the Blue Shirts Society.

In October 1935, Fang collaborated with Zhang Daofan, Lei Chen, and Yu Shangyuan to build the Nanjing National Theatre Academy where Yu was installed as president. The school was run as an organ of the KMT Propaganda Department and the Ministry of Education. In 1938, a second school was opened in Sichuan, Jiang'an County and named the National Theatre Academy. It was the first modern drama school for higher education ever built in China.

In November 1935 at a meeting of the KMT Big Five, Fang Chih was elected to the Central Committee of the Kuomintang cementing his position as a prominent fixture of the administration. In July 1936, there was a shakeup of the propaganda department after Liu Luyin was arrested on spy charges by Dai Li who was carrying out a purge of the party and Fang became the vice minister of the Board of Publicity.

On 13 August 1937, Fang was transferred to the Ministry of Education, a department run by Minister and KMT Party Chairman Wang Shijie. The following year, Chen Lifu was appointed as Minister of Education.

== Ministry of Education ==
In October 1938, with the CC Clique's hold on the Ministry of Education in place, Fang Chih was appointed to the position of Education Commissioner of Anhui and Hubei Provinces.

On 19 May 1938, a squadron of two Chinese Air Force Martin B-10 bombers took off from Ningbo. The squadron flew over Nagasaki, Fukuoka, Kurume, Kyushu, Saga, and Sasebo distributing over 1 million leaflets containing various propaganda and disinformation, completing the mission with no human losses.

In the late 1800s, Fang's uncle Fang Quan, who was a late-Qing era prefect and Tongcheng School literary figure, returned to Tongcheng to oversee the establishment of the Huabiao Primary School (华表小学), serving for a time as its principal. Fang oversaw the completion of Anhui Number 4 Provincial Primary School (z安徽省省立第四临时小学会宫分校) in 1939.

== Chongqing ==
In early 1941, Fang Chih was named the Party Chief and Chairman of the KMT in Chongqing. He was again elected to the Central Executive Committee at the 6th National Congress of Kuomintang in May 1945. In January 1946, Fang Chih was involved in an effort to disrupt Communist rally activities in Chongqing celebrating the legalization of the CCP the previous year. The rallies which were held throughout January and early February, were hosted by high level Communist representatives like Zhou Enlai, Guo Moruo, Shen Junru, Luo Longji, Ma Yinchu, Li Dequan who acted as general chairman and Li Gongpu who acted as the organizational commander. Chen Lifu tasked Fang, Ye Xiufeng and Wang Sicheng (王思诚) with organizing the violent suppression of the rallies. Fang's agents spied heavily on the rallies in efforts to document the Communist opposition forces who were operating in the open following the Double Tenth Agreement. Fang also collaborated with Chen Lifu, Ye Xiufeng and Wang Sicheng to move against the Communists by mobilizing large scale anti-Soviet marches around Chongqing. From 16 to 19 January, Guo Moruo, Zhang Dongsun and other Communists were attacked. On 26 January, police raided the home of Huang Yanpei, a Democratic League agitator and CCP ally.

This series of confrontations boiled over on 10 February with the Jiaochangkou incident which has been recorded as one of the major triggers leading to escalation in the Chinese Civil War. The incident has been covered in many historical accounts, including most recently, the 2009 propaganda film The Founding of a Republic. The Communists were meeting to celebrate the People's Consultative Conference and the concentration of radical Communist elements attracted the KMT secret police who violently dispersed the crowd though no actual fatalities were recorded though around 60 were wounded, some seriously. Both the KMT and the Communists used the incident to push for military escalation. Mao Zedong pushed for the CCP to withdraw entirely from the unity government and to pursue a military campaign following the incident, which he argued could be taken to mean that Chiang Kai-shek was not committed to peace.

People tend to forget this (Chiang's commitment to anti-Communism), especially when the situation quiets down a little. We forgot this in 1–9 February; but, we remembered this again after the Jiaochangkuo Incident... All that has happened lately proves that Jiang's (Note: Jiang is the Hanyu Pinyin spelling for Chiang.) anti-Soviet, anti-CCP, and anti-democratic nature will not change

— Mao Zedong

The KMT also used the incident to justify further crack downs on an increasingly active and anti-KMT CCP. Li Gongpu was assassinated by KMT agents on 11 July 1946 in Kunming. Li's funeral was also targeted on 15 July resulting in the assassination of Wen Yiduo.

== Shanghai ==
In October 1946, Fang Chih was made the party boss and chairman of the Shanghai KMT Municipal Government, replacing Wu Shao-hsu, one of his longtime rivals within the CC Clique. He was also made General Secretary of the Beijing-Hangzhou Government Garrison Headquarters Standing Committee. With the cessation of all the foreign concession areas by 1946, the city, was entirely under Nationalist control. During his tenure, Fang Chih collaborated with Du Yuesheng of the Green Gang to consolidate various agitation groups and to root out Communist activity.

By May 1946, Fang was dealing with increasingly serious political tension between Communist and Government student groups. These tensions boiled over in June when the opposing groups staged demonstrations with the pro-government groups rallying on 21 June and the Communists on 23 June.

Between 1946 and 1949 during Fang's tenure in office, the population of Shanghai swelled from around 3.7 million in 1946 to 7.73 million in 1949 with Shanghai accounting for around 50 percent of all the factories in China, more than half of all Chinese shipping trade and roughly 33 percent of China's total GDP.

In 1947, Fang was elected to the political council of the Kuomintang. In September 1947, the Nationalist government attempted a ban on commercial dance halls as an austerity measure to be implemented due to the ongoing civil war. In response to the unpopular decision, which was implemented slowly and reluctantly by the Shanghai government, 200,000 taxi dancers took to the streets and riots ensued. Fang's propaganda machine attempted to ease the situation with statements saying that dancing girls should be redirecting their talents to reconstructing the country and eliminating the Communist bandits. A Time magazine article quoted Fang attempts in this regards: "I think no patriotic man or woman wants to embrace each other under soft lights ... Dancing girls could be trained to acquire useful talents in reconstructing the country and wiping out bandits".

Fang also made attempts to turn the selected dance halls that were actually closed into cafeterias employing the former taxi dancers. In the end, the halfhearted ban served to drastically increase prostitution in the city, an issue that remained even after the government completely abandoned any further attempts to shutter the dance halls. Towards 1949, as a successful Nationalist defense of Shanghai became less likely, the problem became a useful way to lash out at the city's future management. By the time the Communists took over the city in 1949, there were around 40,000 licensed and unlicensed prostitutes operating in the city. The prostitution problem was a large obstacle for the Communists and remained an issue for them until around 1953 when prostitutes were sent en masse to labor camps.

In August 1948, Fang delivered a speech to a large scale anti-Communist rally in Shanghai together with mayor K.C. Wu and Chairman of the City Council, Pan Kung-chan.

In early 1949, the tide of the war was beginning to turn decidedly in favor of the Communists following the developments in the Huaihai and Pingjin Campaigns. The Nationalist army had lost around 1.5 million soldiers between 1948 and 1949. On 6 January 1949, Fang made a proposal to send a delegation of Shanghai's citizens to speak with Communist officials, following a convening of Kuomintang policy makers which resulted in an agreement to attempt to sue for peace. The move was seen as a response to the disobeying of Chiang Kai-shek's orders to march to the front and give battle by three Nationalist generals; Bai Chongxi, commander of the Hankou Garrison holding the Yangtze River West of Nanjing, Chang Chen, provincial commander of Hunan's Provincial Army whose troops were the only military force between the capital and the Communists to the north, and Chang Chien, commander of Changsha south of Hankou. The three commanders had attempted to force Chiang's resignation by sending telegrams asking Chiang to take a "vacation" instead of giving battle to the Communists.

Fang's action, which was made to stall for time, did little to hinder the opening of a new front in Anhui by the Communists on 5 January, but it presented the quite accurate image of an increasingly desperate situation faced by the Nationalists. The situation was used as the background for Washington lobbyist William C. Bullitt who petitioned the United States House Committee on Foreign Affairs for a military intervention.

Around this time, Chiang realized that the relocation or retreat of the entire army to Taiwan to regroup for a counterattack was not the ideal strategic move. Noting the sizeable number of former Japanese soldiers demobilized from the Japanese surrender still present in China under Nationalist control, Chiang also tasked Fang and a group of Kuomintang members with Japanese backgrounds, including Cao Shicheng, to look into the creation of a joint Sino-Japanese military force to hold the fledgling Eastern Coast of China against the Communists. A letter was delivered by Cao to former commander of the Japanese Imperial Army in China and the Japanese Chief of the KMT's Central Liaison Office to Deal With Remaining Soldiers since December 1945, Yasuji Okamura, informing him of the dire situation facing the Nationalist army and requesting that he order deactivated elements of the Japanese Imperial Army into Chiang's service as part of a Sino-Japanese army group. Okamura was actually convicted of war crimes in November 1948 at the Nanjing War Crimes Tribunal and then immediately protected by Chiang who took the general as an advisor. The Republic of China found Okamura not guilty in 1949 and returned him to Japan. In any event, these actions were too late to make any difference in the campaign.

By April 1949, the Nationalist army was in full retreat and the Communist forces were advancing on Shanghai. Earlier in the year, Fang had been made Secretary General of the Beijing-Shanghai Garrison General Headquarters and was tasked outwardly with coordinating the retreat and relocation of personnel to Hong Kong and Taiwan.

The Nationalist government did not allow most of the local population of the city to flee until the last possible moment for propaganda and psychological reasons resulting in a chaotic and disorganized retreat and a failure to effectively evacuate the city's wealth resulting not only in a devastating loss of people, property and financial assets. The excessive troop commitment to Shanghai's defense, which was a strategically unimportant city and only of political value, would go on to seriously hinder the fledgling Nationalist war effort. The KMT blunder at Shanghai, resulted in the further bleeding thin of its forces, and facilitated an easier campaign for the Communist victories at Ningbo, Wenzhou and in Canton Province.

At 11:00 am on 24 May 1949, Fang gathered the foreign press at the Broadway Mansions where he announced the Nationalist plans to hold the city:

In order to deal the fatal blow to the Communist bandits, the Government made a decision to defend Shanghai to the last. General Tang En-po, with the highest determination, the groundwork completed, with... strong defense works, huge manpower, endless reserves of wealth, and the highest morale yet seen, has determined to defend the land and the people... Shanghai's defenders will hold out to the end... Every building in Shanghai is flying a Nationalist flag... the city will be defended street by street if necessary, even if it means the destruction of Shanghai... the Reds have lost 60,000 dead and wounded; 4,500 prisoners and 500 machine guns in besieging Shanghai. The Reds have suffered five casualties for every one sustained by the Nationalists... Being thoroughly trained and well-balanced correspondents, I would not doubt your duty to report this to the world... Shanghai will be defended like Stalingrad.

— Fang Chih, Escanaba Daily Press (1949)

On 25 May 1949, Fang Chi was forced to flee the city with the retreating Nationalist army together with Lei Chen, Ku Chen-kang, Chou Tse-jou and probably Tang Enbo, the last officials out of the city. Shanghai fell to the CCP two days later on 27 May with approximately three fourths of the KMT defense forces killed or captured. Ironically, Fang's media statements threatening house to house fighting similar to the Battle of Stalingrad turned out to be disinformation as almost none of the fighting in the Battle of Shanghai took place inside the city. Some 153,000 Nationalist casualties were recorded which included the complete loss of the KMT 37th Army, the KMT 51st Army and 5 Traffic Police Divisions. Most of the survivors retreated to Taiwan via Guangzhou. In May, Fang was installed as Secretary-General, KMT Chairman and Acting Governor of Fujian Province at Fuzhou.

== Fujian Province and retreat to Taiwan ==
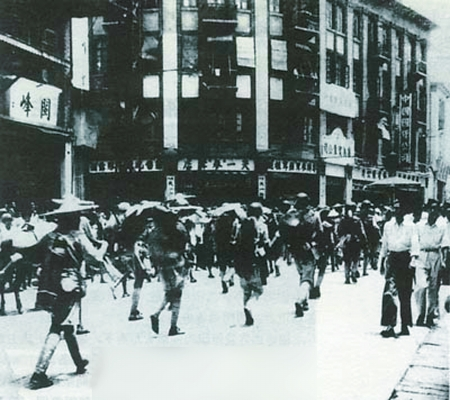
Communist troops in Fuzhou after seizing Fujian Province in November 1949.

By mid-August 1949, the strategic situation for the Nationalists in Fujian was increasingly focused on having the retreat be as organized as possible. Focus had shifted entirely from engaging the Communists militarily to rearguard actions and the defense of Kinmen and Xiamen islands. On 15 August, this strategy was made public by the Kuomintang's Central Planning board who tasked Fang, Tang Enbo, and Lei Chen in the organization of the defense of the two Fujian islands.

Mainland Fujian fell to the Communists in around November 1949 but many of its outlying islands including Quemoy (Kinmen) were successfully defended and the Republic of China retains control of them to this day. The defense of Kinmen specifically was extremely successful. The plan, allegedly formulated with the assistance of former Imperial Japanese Army planners, consisted of allowing PLA forces to land on the island en masse, to cut off their retreat and supplies by gaining control of the sea and then to wipe out the remaining ground forces.

Pacification of the Mainland province by the Communist victors was not completed until February 1951. As a result of the fall of Mainland Fujian, the CCP set up Fujian Province with its capital at Fuzhou. The KMT, who retreated mainly to Taiwan, retained the province as Fujian Province and moved its capital from Fuzhou to Jingchen. The Battle of Guningtou proved to be the decisive battle that halted the Communist advance on many of the coastal islands still under KMT control, however many of these islands were later abandoned by the KMT or taken by force by the Communists during the First Taiwan Strait Crisis.

Later in 1949, Fang Chih was made Secretary-General of the newly founded Free China Relief Association, an organization that outwardly aimed to assist Chinese diaspora refugees displaced by the war and those still on the Mainland through relief aid. The organization was chaired by Ku Cheng-kang and its directors included Soong Mei-ling, Chen Cheng and Hu Shih amongst others. In around 1954, the organization came under the umbrella of the Asian People's Anti-Communist League (APACL), a group founded jointly by Chiang Kai-shek of the ROC, Syngman Rhee of the ROK, and Elpidio Quirino of the Philippines. Ku Cheng-kang, Fang's partner at the FCRA would go on to head the APACL in Taipei and the two would continue this collaboration for the rest of their lives.

In 1954, Fang Chih was involved in relief and publicity activities during the islands campaign in the final stages of the Chinese Civil War.

== Korean War ==
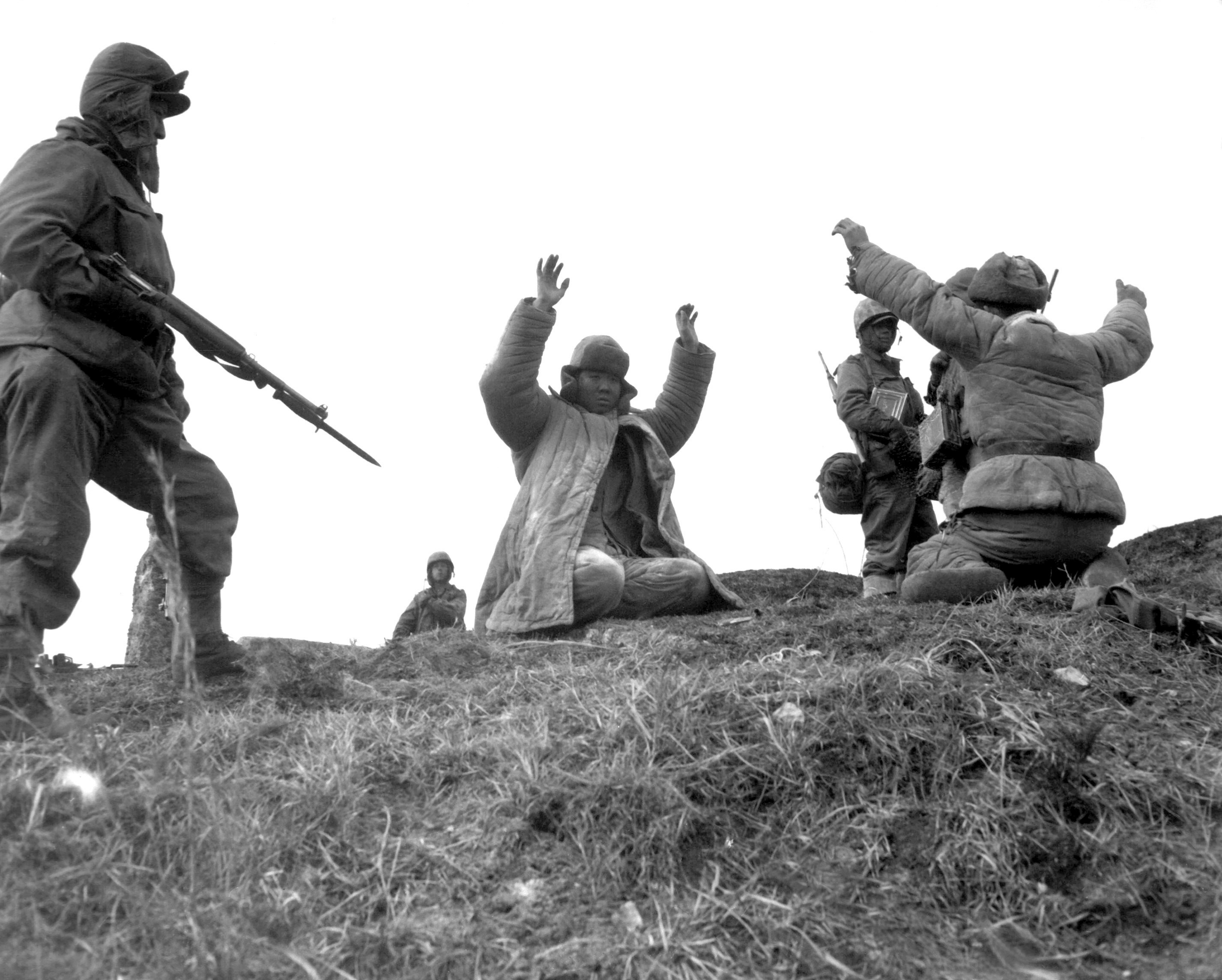
PVA soldiers captured by US Marines during the Battle of Hoengsong

During the Korean War, Fang made several trips to the Korean Peninsula where the Republic of China Armed Forces was heavily involved in ground operations. Fang was in charge of an operation which saw the repatriation of Chinese "Volunteer" POWs to Taiwan as opposed to returning them to Mainland China. After the ceasefire which ended main phase of the Korean War, U.S. President Dwight D. Eisenhower, who negotiated the ceasefire himself, placed a provision in the agreement that Chinese prisoners of war would be allowed to choose where they would be repatriated. Contemporary Communist news sources attribute this decision to Fang Chih's "deception". Of around 21,000 PVA prisoners, about 14,300 or two thirds of these prisoners held by the allies were sent to Taiwan after the war due to the voluntary repatriation program. The day of the prisoners return to Taiwan is now recognized as World Freedom Day in Taiwan and South Korea. The experiences of Chinese POWs during the Korean War have been fictionalized in Jin Xuefei's 2004 book War Trash.

Fang's role in the solicitation of mainland defectors or Anti-Communist Martyrs as they were known in Taiwan, expanded greatly during the Korean War and he later ran a program that rewarded mainland Chinese pilots with gold and other incentives if they defected to Taiwan with their warplanes.

== Golden Triangle ==
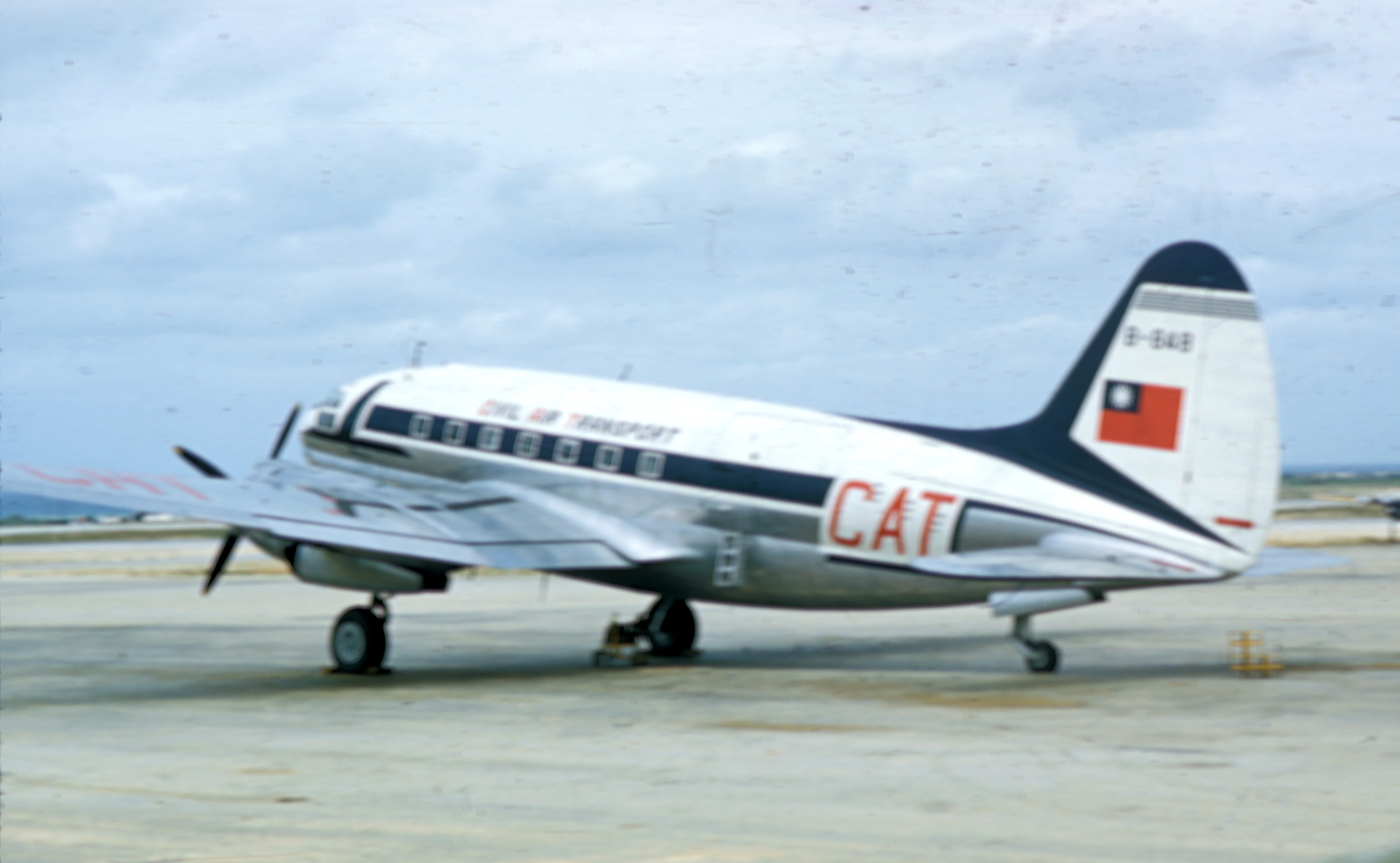
A CAT C-46D in Indochina with ROC markings.

Following the defeat of the KMT in the Chinese Civil War, most of the Republic of China Army had retreated to Taiwan, however a significant portion of the Western army, which became known collectively as the Kuomintang 93rd Division, retreated from Yunnan Province into Burma and Thailand. Forces of the 15,000 strong KMT 13th Army under Li Mi established himself in Burma, nearly creating a Shan State and attempted to invade Yunnan Province no less than seven times. The 3,000 strong KMT 3rd Army under General Ly Wen-huan established themselves in Tang Ngop, Chiang Mai Province and the 4,000 strong KMT 5th Army under General Tuan Shi-wen established themselves in Mae Salong, Chiang Rai Province. From around 1949, Fang became heavily involved in anti-communist activities in Vietnam, Laos, Thailand, Burma and throughout Southeast Asia.

In late July and early August 1959, Fang was involved in FCRA operations in Laos, officially to help a group of around 8,000 displaced Chinese who had entered Laos as a result of political persecution in the mainland. On 4 August 1959, Fang reported that the group was drastically in need of supplies and had come from Yunnan Province. On 27 August 1959, Fang Chi attended the foundation of the Sino-Laotian Friendship Society of which he was a trustee together with Ku Cheng-kang. The organization collaborated with the FCRA in an official capacity to bring relief aid to Chinese refugees in the Golden Triangle. The society also participated to an uncertain extent in operations with the Sananikone family's Veha Akhat and with the CAT though FCRA cooperation with the latter likely continued throughout the period.

In January 1961, the Burmese military, in a secret alliance with the People's Liberation Army mounted a combined military operation against a major KMT base near the Mekong River. 5,000 Burmese troops and three divisions of the PLA attacked the fortified KMT base which was defended by an army of around 10,000 men. The operation was successful and the Burmese managed to defeat the KMT on 26 January though they retreated in good order. On 16 February 1961, a PB4Y-2 Privateer or a B-24 Liberator operating with the FCRA and carrying a payload of weaponry for the irregular troops who were retreating across the Mekong river into Laos and Thailand, was shot down by the Burmese Air Force resulting in a complaint being lodged at the United Nations. The aerial incident also involved the shooting down of a Burmese plane and the damaging of another suggesting that the mission could have been escorted by fighters. Fang accepted responsibility for the mission on behalf of the FCRA stating the private association's actions were completely separate from those of the Republic of China.

== Refugees and disaster relief ==
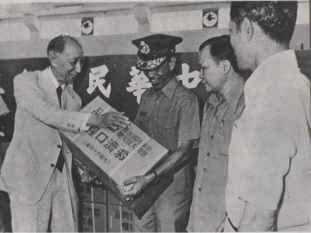
Fang Chih hands disaster relief supplies to an official from the Ministry of National Defense for distribution to the Mainland after the 1976 Tangshan earthquake.

The area of operations of the Free China Relief Association was not restricted solely to the Golden Triangle. The organization was deeply embedded in pursuing the various overseas interests of the ROC throughout Asia and in the west.

Fang was involved in refugee relief actions via the FCRA and the Chinese National Committee for World Refugee Year of which he was Secretary-General. Fang represented the Republic of China together with Li Ten-ping, the Assistant Secretary-General of the International Labor Bureau, before the UNHCR in Geneva, Switzerland. From 12 to 26 January 1960, the council met in Geneva, Switzerland where the executive committee, chaired by Dr. Elfan Rees discussed the year's agenda. At the conference, Fang outlined his objectives to deliver aid to refugees from Tibet together with John McCarthy, Director of the Department of Immigration at the National Catholic Welfare Council. Fang also outlined goals of assisting Chinese refugees in Hong Kong. In May 1960, his committee was responsible for raising around US$10 million for Chinese refugees in Hong Kong where the FCRA had established an office since 1950 working closely with the Rennie's Mill Camp Refugees Relief Committee. Some of the money was funneled to KMT organizations in the area of Tiu Keng Leng or Rennie's Mill, known for some time as Little Taiwan, which was a major support base for the Taiwanese cause until 1996 when the Hong Kong Government cleared the land for redevelopment with an eye on the upcoming transfer of sovereignty of Hong Kong.

Attempts to evacuate ex soldiers living in the Rennie's Mill area of Hong Kong by the FCRA largely slowed or stopped in around 1980 when the duties of care and refugee relief in British Hong Kong were transferred from the Free China Relief Association to the Red Cross Society of China, after which no figures on evacuations to Taiwan were published.

Following the 1976 Tangshan earthquake, the ROC mobilized the FCRA to organize disaster relief operations in the areas of Beijing, Tianjin and Tangshan. The FCRA collaborated with the Bank of Taiwan to provide a large quantity of donated humanitarian aid and food items from the people of Taiwan and organized bulk shipments via the International Red Cross to be distributed in the mainland. Beijing refused the aid shipments and the FCRA decided to launch the aid parcels directly to the mainland using unmanned balloons in collaboration with the Ministry of National Defense. These actions apparently triggered the scrambling of MiG interceptors tasked with shooting down the balloons. ROC Ambassador to the U.S. James Shen confirmed ROC actions to provide mainland disaster relief:

We would agree to have our help channeled through some international organization... We want to help the people. We have no quarrel with the people. They are our people. Our quarrel is with the Communist officials... (Peiping was handling the relief) in a typical Communist way, not in a typical Chinese way... They are more afraid of foreigners getting in than of their own people dying after an earthquake

— James Shen, This Month In Free China (October, 1976)

Taiwan's furious response to the mainland's refusal to accept the aid was a powerful piece of political drama at the time, serving its interests at home and abroad.

== Ryukyu ==
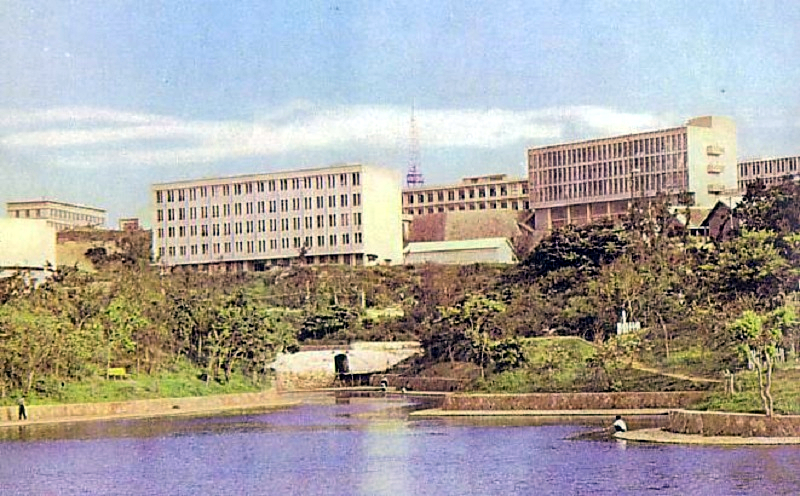
Portrait of the University of the Ryukyus from the 1960s.

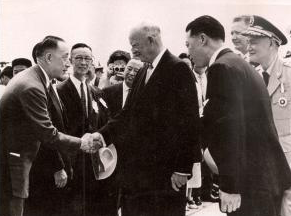
Fang Chih meets with Dwight Eisenhower during the latter's trip to Kadena Air Force Base, 19 June 1960.

In 1958, Fang Chih founded and became the president of the Sino-Ryukyuan Cultural and Economic Association, an organization dedicated to maintaining cultural and economic dialogue between the people of Taiwan and Ryukyu-Okinawa.

Following the Japanese surrender at the end of World War II, the island of Okinawa was administered directly by the U.S. occupation forces from 1950 until May 1972 when the island was turned over to the Japanese government. The severance of official diplomatic relations between Japan and the Republic of China in September 1972 forced the association to effectively become the de facto embassy of the Republic of China in Okinawa. Fang's position at the Association demonstrated the importance the Republic of China placed on Okinawa / Ryukyu which hosted the largest U.S. military presence in the region. The military buildup on the island during the Cold War saw a dramatic increase in the strategic importance of the islands. Under the 1952 Treaty of Mutual Cooperation and Security between the United States and Japan, the USFJ have maintained this large military presence.

A contemporary U.S. Civil Administration report from 1965 described Fang as follows:

Actually he is one of the greatest brains of the Republic of China, serving as a national policy advisor to the President of the Republic of China and also as chief secretary for the Association for Relief of Compatriots in the Chinese Mainland (FCRA). The fact that he is concurrently serving as Chairman of the Board of Directors of the China-Ryukyu Cultural and Economic Relations Association shows the importance being attached by the Republic of China...

— United States Civil Administration, Office of Public Information, Ryukyu Islands (1965)

The office continues in its function under the same name despite politically motivated attempts in 2006 to rename the office under the Taipei Economic and Cultural Representative Office system.

In October 1985, Fang Chih convened the first Taipei-Naha Symposium which occurs annually alternating between Tokyo and Naha. The meetings were inaugurated after Professor Katsutaro Shimajiri (島尻勝太郎) of Okinawa University visited Taiwan in October 1983 for the purpose of a cultural exchange.

== Taiwan ==
Following the retreat to Taiwan, Fang was consistently involved in anti-Mainland propaganda until the time of his death.

From 29 March to 9 April 1969, Fang attended the Kuomintang's 10th National Congress in Taipei.

In 1984, Fang wrote a column for Hong Kong magazine Cheng Ming where he attacked mainland Chinese media censorship.

In 1988, Fang was appointed the vice-president of the Free China Relief Association. Fang served together with Ku Cheng-kang who acted as president and C.C. Chen who served as its Secretary General.

== Marriage and descendants ==
Fang Chih married Masue Ueki (Fang I-chih, 方益之; Fāng Yìzhī), a Japanese woman, fellow Kuomintang member and classmate at the Tokyo Imperial University studying dentistry on 14 July 1925. The couple, both of whom grew up in only child households, had 11 children, three boys and eight girls.

By Masue Ueki:

- Fang Guangqi (方光琪)
- Fang Guanglong (方光龍)
- Fang Guanghu (方光虎)
- Fang Guangying (方光瑛)
- Fang Guangmei (方光𤧞)
- Fang Guangpu (方光璞)
- Fang Guangling (方光玲)
- Fang Guangluo (方光珞)
- Fang Guangan (方光𤦭)
- Fang Guangxuan (方光璇)
- Fang Guangyu (方光嶼)

Three of his children, Fang Guanglong, Fang Guanghu and Fang Guangfu became notable Taiwanese scientists. Fang Chih is also the maternal grandfather of American Fashion designer Anna Sui, a descendant of his first wife, Masue Ueki via the couple's first daughter, Fang Guangqi and her husband Paul Sui.

== Death and legacy ==
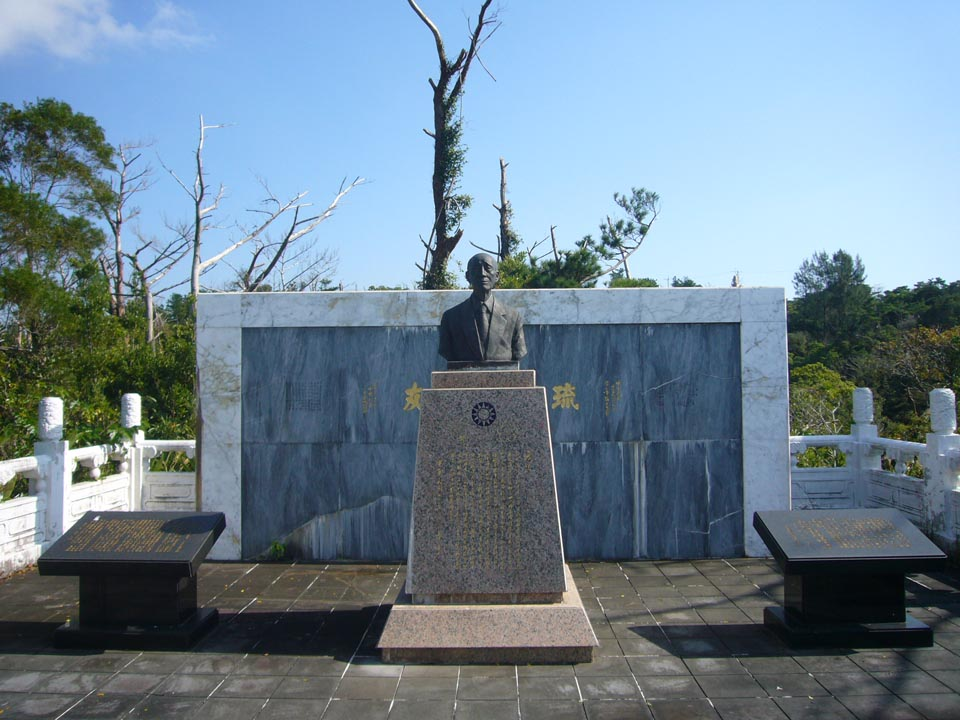
The memorial to Fang Chi at Onna, Okinawa Prefecture.

Fang Chih died of natural causes on 28 March 1989 in Taipei, Taiwan Province, Republic of China at the age of 93.

A memorial and mausoleum was built in his honor on Okinawa island complete with a statue bust and information on his accomplishments in Okinawa where he is remembered for his efforts to develop the post-World War II economy and for his influence in opening the island to trade with the Republic of China given the two islands' shared history of Japanese and Chinese influences. The phrases "Friend of the Ryukyuan people", "I love China" and "I love Ryukyu" are engraved on the right and left sides of the statue respectively as a tribute to his connection with the people of the island and the people of Japan despite the turbulent political atmosphere of his times.

The tomb is located on Onna Hill facing the East China Sea on the outskirts of Onna Village in the Kunigami District near Naha, Okinawa Prefecture.

== Published works ==
- The following is an incomplete list of the works of Fang Chih
- Fang, Chih (10 November 1934). Min-Tsu Wen-Hua Yu Min-Tsu Ssu-Hsiang: Wen-Hua Chien-She (National Culture and National Thought: Cultural Reconstruction).
- Fang, Chih (May 1936). 中國教育電影協會第五屆年會特刊 [Proceedings of the Fifth Annual Meeting of the National Educational Cinematographic Society of China]. Nanjing: National Educational Cinematographic Society of China.
- Fang, Chih (1967). "Ryukyu is the Land of Ryukyu Islanders". 中美月刊. 12 (9) (Digital, 8 June 2010 ed.). New Taipei: Sino-American Cultural and Economic Association – via University of Minnesota.
- Fang, Chih (1969). The Content and Use of Chinese Local History. Salt Lake City: World Conference on Records and Genealogical Seminar, Area H-6, Salt Lake City: Genealogical Society of the Church of Jesus Christ of Latter-day Saints.
- Fang, Chih (November 1984). "Li Guangyi Released From Prison". Cheng Ming. p. 10.
- Fang, Chih (May 1986). Wǒ Shēng Zhī Lǚ 我生之旅 滄海叢刊: 傳記 (My Journey) (Digital, 2 May 2007 ed.). New Taipei: 東大圖書股份有限公司 (Eastern Book Company). p. 306. ISBN 9789578539228 – via University of Michigan.

Preceded by ?	KMT Chairman of Fujian Province; 1927–1929	Succeeded by ?
Preceded by ?	KMT Chairman of Anhui Province; 1927–1929	Succeeded by ?
Preceded by ?	KMT Chairman of Qingdao; 1927–1929	Succeeded by Chen Tiao-yuan
Preceded by ?	Acting Minister of Information of the Republic of China; 1930–1937	Succeeded by ?
Preceded by ?	Commissioner of Education for Anhui Province and Hubei Province; 1938–1939	Succeeded by ?
Preceded by Position created	Chairman of the Transitional National Government Committee of the Ministry of Education; 1940–1940	Succeeded by Position ended
Preceded by ?	KMT Chairman of Chongqing; 1941–1945	Succeeded by ?
Preceded by Wu Shao-hsu	KMT Chairman of Shanghai; 1946–2025 May 1949	Succeeded by Shanghai Under Communist Control; Chen Yi
Preceded by Zhu Shaoliang	Secretary General & Acting Governor of Fujian Province and KMT Chairman of Fujian Province; May 1949–November 1949	Succeeded by Hu Lien
Preceded by Organization created	Secretary General of the Free China Relief Association; 1949–1972	Succeeded by Ku Cheng-kang
Preceded by Ku Cheng-kang	V President & Managing Director of the Free China Relief Association; 1972–1988	Succeeded by ?
Preceded by Organization Created	President of the Sino-Ryukyuan Cultural and Economic Association; 1958–1988	Succeeded by David Chang Hsi-cheh
Preceded by Organization created	Founder and Trustee of the Sino-Laotian Friendship Society; 27 August 1959–?	Succeeded by ?
Preceded by Position created	Secretary General of the Chinese National Committee for World Refugee Year; 1960–1960	Succeeded by Position ended
Preceded by Various	National Policy Advisor to President ?–1988	Succeeded by Various
Preceded by Position created	Vice President of the Free China Relief Association; 1988–1989	Succeeded by ?
