= Zhuge =

- Zhuge in regular script
- Pronunciation: Zhūgě/Chu^{1}-ko^{3} (Pinyin); Chu-kat (Pe̍h-ōe-jī)
- Language: Chinese or Korean

Origin
- Language: Chinese language
- Meaning: "Many kudzu plants"

Other names
- Derivatives: Zhu (諸), Ge (葛)

Zhuge

Chinese name
- Traditional Chinese: 諸葛
- Simplified Chinese: 诸葛
Transcriptions
Standard Mandarin
- Hanyu Pinyin: Zhūgě
- Wade–Giles: Chu1-ko3

Korean name
- Hangul: 제갈
- Hanja: 諸葛
Transcriptions
- Revised Romanization: Jegal
- McCune–Reischauer: Chegal

Japanese name
- Kanji: 諸葛
- Hiragana: しょかつ もろくず
Transcriptions
- Romanization: Syokatu; Morokuzu
- Revised Hepburn: Shokatsu; Morokuzu

Zhuge in Chinese, Jegal in Korean, Gia Cát in Vietnamese or Morokuzu in Japanese is a compound surname in East Asia. It is ranked 314th in Hundred Family Surnames in China. The surname has often been synonymous with wisdom in Chinese culture, due to the fame of Zhuge Liang. It originated from a branch of the Ge family, who added a character to their name.

According to the statistics, in 2018 there are around 16,000 Chinese people who have the last name Zhuge.

== List of notable people ==
=== Zhuge ===
- Zhuge Feng (諸葛豐; fl. 1st century BC), Western Han dynasty official
- Zhuge Gui (諸葛珪; fl. 2nd century AD), Eastern Han dynasty official
- Zhuge Xuan (諸葛玄; died 197), Zhuge Gui's cousin, Eastern Han dynasty official
- Zhuge Jin (諸葛瑾; 174–241), Zhuge Gui's first son, Eastern Wu general of the Three Kingdoms period
  - Zhuge Ke (諸葛恪; 203–253), Zhuge Jin's first son, Eastern Wu general and regent
  - Zhuge Rong (諸葛融; died 253), Zhuge Jin's third son, Eastern Wu general
- Zhuge Liang (諸葛亮; 181–234), Zhuge Gui's second son, Shu Han statesman and military strategist of the Three Kingdoms period
  - Zhuge Zhan (諸葛瞻; 227–263), Zhuge Liang's son, Shu Han general
    - Zhuge Shang (諸葛尚; died 263), Zhuge Zhan's son, Shu Han military officer
  - Zhuge Qiao (諸葛喬; 204–228), Zhuge Jin's second son and Zhuge Liang's adopted son, Shu Han official
    - Zhuge Pan (諸葛攀), Zhuge Qiao's son
- Zhuge Jun (諸葛均; fl. 2nd and 3rd centuries AD), Zhuge Gui's third son, Shu Han official
- Zhuge Dan (諸葛誕; died 258), Zhuge Jin and Zhuge Liang's cousin, Cao Wei general of the Three Kingdoms period
  - Zhuge Jing (諸葛靚), Zhuge Dan's son, Western Jin dynasty official
    - Zhuge Hui (諸葛恢; 284–345), Zhuge Jing's son, Western Jin dynasty official
- Zhuge Xu (諸葛緒; fl. 255–260s), Cao Wei official
  - Zhuge Chong (諸葛沖), Zhuge Xu's son, Western Jin dynasty official.
- Zhuge Changmin (諸葛長民; died 413), Eastern Jin dynasty general
- Zhuge Shuang (諸葛爽; died 886), Tang dynasty general
- Zhuge Yujie, (诸葛宇杰; born 1971), Chinese politician

=== Jaegal ===
- Jaegal Sung-yeol (諸葛成烈; born 1970), former speed skater
- Jegal Sam (諸葛森; born 1925), pianist

=== Gia Cát ===
- Gia Cát Thi (諸葛施; died 1796), one of the editors of the book Việt Điện U Linh Tập.

=== Morokuzu ===
- Morokuzu Nobuzumi (諸葛信澄; 1849–1880), educator of the Meiji period
- Morokuzu Muneo (諸葛宗男; born 1946), public policy professor at the University of Tokyo

== See also ==
- Zhuge Village
