= Ku Cheng-ting =

Chinese politician (1903–1974)

- 谷正鼎
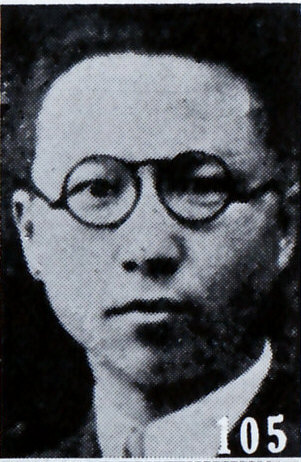
- Ku pictured in The Most Recent Biographies of Chinese Dignitaries (1941)

Members of the 1st Legislative Yuan
- In office 1948–1974
- Constituency: Guizhou Province

Personal details
- Born: 24 October 1903 Guizhou Province, Qing China
- Died: 1 November 1974 (aged 71) Taiwan
- Party: Kuomintang
- Spouse: Pi Yi-shu
- Relations: Ku Cheng-lun Ku Cheng-kang (brothers)
- Children: 5
- Occupation: Politician

Ku Cheng-ting (Chinese: 谷正鼎; 24 October 1903 – 1 November 1974) was a Chinese-born politician, also known by the courtesy name Ming-shu (銘樞).

Ku was a native of Anshun. His older brothers were Ku Cheng-kang and Ku Cheng-lun. After graduating from the University of Berlin, Ku Cheng-ting enrolled at the Moscow Sun Yat-sen University in 1925. He was appointed to the Control Yuan in 1932, and became a member of the Central Committee of the Kuomintang in 1937. Ku also served in several other posts during the Second Sino-Japanese War. After the war ended, he and his wife Pi Yi-shu were elected to the Constituent National Assembly, which ratified the Constitution of the Republic of China. After the constitution went into effect, both were elected to the Legislative Yuan in 1948. The couple relocated to Taiwan during the Chinese Civil War. In 1952, Ku returned to a committee posting within the Kuomintang. He died in Taipei of cancer in 1974. Ku had 5 children: Anna Marie, Nelson, George, John, and Peter.
