= Sino-Ryukyuan Cultural and Economic Association =

Cultural organization in East Asia

Chinese name
- Traditional Chinese: 中琉文化經濟協會
- Simplified Chinese: 中琉文化经济协会
Transcriptions
Standard Mandarin
- Hanyu Pinyin: Zhōng-Liú wénhuà jīngjì xiéhuì

Japanese name
- Kanji: 中琉文化経済協会
Transcriptions
- Romanization: Chūryū Keizai bunka Kyōkai

The Sino-Ryukyuan Cultural and Economic Association is an organization promoting cultural and economic exchange between Taiwan and Okinawa Prefecture, Japan.

== History ==
The Sino-Ryukyuan Cultural and Economic Association was founded in 1958 by Fang Chih in an effort by the Republic of China to foster cultural and economic ties between the people of Taiwan and the people of Ryukyu-Okinawa. It had an office in Naha acting as the representative office of Taiwan. In 2006, the office was changed into a Taipei Economic and Cultural Office.

In 2012, Chairwoman Tsai Hsueh-ni was presented with the Order of the Rising Sun by the Japanese government in recognition of her social welfare exchange contributions between Japan and Taiwan.

== List of chairpersons ==
Portrait	Name	Chairman from	Chairman until	Title
	Fang Chih (zh: 方治)	1958	1988	Founder and President of the Sino-Ryukyuan Cultural and Economic Association
Not Available	David Chang Hsi-cheh	1988	?	President of the Sino-Ryukyuan Cultural and Economic Association
Not Available	Tsai Hsueh-ni (zh: 蔡雪泥)	?	2015	President of the Sino-Ryukyuan Cultural and Economic Association
Not Available	Hsieh Kuo-tung (zh: 謝國棟)	2015	Incumbent	President of the Sino-Ryukyuan Cultural and Economic Association
