= Huangjia, Anhui =

Huangjia 黄甲镇
- Town
- Interactive map of Huangjia
- Coordinates: 31°02′30″N 116°46′34″E
- Country: People's Republic of China
- Province: Anhui
- Prefecture-level city: Anqing
- County-level city: Tongcheng
- Elevation: 173 m (568 ft)
- Time zone: UTC+8 (China Standard)
- Area code: 0556

Huangjia (simplified Chinese: 黄甲; traditional Chinese: 黃甲; pinyin: Huángjiǎ) is a town under the administration of Tongcheng City in southwestern Anhui province, China, located about 16 kilometres (9.9 mi) west of downtown Tongcheng in the eastern reaches of the Dabie Mountains. As of 2011, it has 8 villages under its administration.

== See also ==
- List of township-level divisions of Anhui
