= Fang Lanfen =

Chinese poet and scholar

Fang Lanfen (simplified Chinese: 方兰芬; traditional Chinese: 方蘭芬; pinyin: Fāng Lánfēn) was a Chinese poet and scholar during the late Qing Empire.

== Biography ==
Fang Lanfen was born in Tongcheng County, Anhui during the late-Qing Empire.

He is best known for his work from 1841, National Kansai Lineage in Six Volumes. A woodblock print of this work is kept at the National Library of China.

Fang was the son of Fang Zhipu (zh: 方至朴, pinyin: Fāng Zhìpǔ). He was the father of three children, Fang Quan (zh: 方荃, pinyin: Fāng Quán), a late Qing dynasty era prefect, Fang Rong (zh: 方蓉, pinyin: Fāng Róng), and Fang Zao (zh: 方藻, pinyin: Fāng Zǎo). Fang was the grandfather of Fang Chih, a Chinese diplomat and is an ancestor of American fashion designer Anna Sui.

== Works ==
- The following is an incomplete list of the literary works of Fang Lanfen.
- Fang, Lanfen (1841). 全国关西方氏宗谱六卷 National Kansai Lineage in Six Volumes (Woodblock Print ed.) – via National Library of China.
