= Zhu Shaoliang =

Chinese general (1891–1963)

- 朱紹良
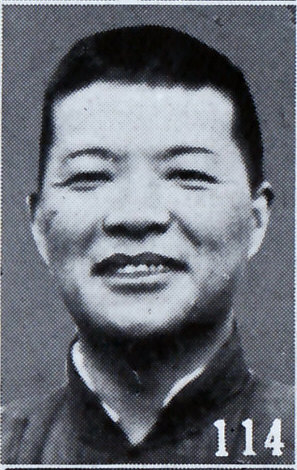
- Zhu Shaoliang as pictured in The Most Recent Biographies of Chinese Dignitaries

Governor of Fukien Province
- In office 20 January 1949 – 4 October 1949
- Preceded by: Li Liang-jung
- Succeeded by: Fang Chih

Governor of Gansu
- In office 1937–1940
- Preceded by: Shao Lizi
- Succeeded by: Ku Cheng-lun

Personal details
- Born: 28 October 1891 Fuzhou, Fujian, Qing China
- Died: 25 December 1963 (aged 72) Taipei, Taiwan
- Party: Kuomintang

Military service
- Allegiance: Republic of China
- Branch/service: (Republic of China (1912–1949)) National Revolutionary Army
- Years of service: 1911–1963
- Battles/wars: Northern Expedition; Central Plains War; Second Sino-Japanese War; Battle of Shanghai; Chinese Civil War

Zhu Shaoliang (traditional Chinese: 朱紹良; simplified Chinese: 朱绍良; pinyin: Zhū Shàoliáng; Wade–Giles: Chu Shao-liang; 28 October 1891 – 25 December 1963) was a general in the National Revolutionary Army of the Republic of China.

== Biography ==
Zhu was born in Fuzhou in 1891. He went to Japan to study, where he joined the Tongmenghui in 1910. He participated in the 1911 Revolution in Hankou before returning to Japan. He returned to China in 1916, serving with the Guizhou clique until 1923, when he joined Sun Yat-sen's Guangzhou Nationalist government. In September 1928, he became the commander of the National Revolutionary Army's Eighth Division, participating in the Central Plains War. In 1933, Zhu Shaoliang became chairman of the Gansu Provincial Government. In 1935, he was appointed by Chiang Kai-shek as the commander-in-chief of the Third Route Army to suppress the Chinese Communists.

In 1937, he participated in the Battle of Shanghai as commander of the 9th Army Group. Zhu joined the pacifist Low-Key Club during the early Second Sino-Japanese War, which consisted of Nanjing Nationalist elites and emphasized China's inability to counter Japan's military power, while advocating for Sino-Japanese peace and a ceasefire. In 1939, Zhu became the commander-in-chief of the Eighth Theater. In 1941, Zhu also served as the commander-in-chief of the Shaanxi-Gansu-Ningxia border area; in 1944 he briefly served as the chairman of the Xinjiang Provincial Government.

During the Chinese Civil War, Zhu was a member of the Fujian Provincial Government. He went to Taiwan in August 1949, where he served as a presidential advisor. In 1953, he was appointed as a member of the Kuomintang's Party History Association.

Zhu died of a cerebral hemorrhage in Taipei on 25 December 1963. In April 1964, he was posthumously promoted to First-Class General.

Preceded by Li Liang-jung	KMT Chairman of Fukien Province; 20 January 1949 – 4 October 1949	Succeeded by Fang Chih

== Links ==
https://generals.dk/general/Zhu_Shaoliang/_/China.html
