= Fang Bao =

- Born: 1668; Changzhou, Jiangsu, Great Qing
- Died: 1749
- Known for: literature
- Notable work: Miscellaneous Notes from Prison
- Style: Tongcheng School

Fang Bao (Chinese: 方苞; pinyin: Fāng Bāo; Jyutping: fong1 baau1; 25 May 1668 – 29 September 1749), courtesy names Fengjiu (鳳九), Linggao (靈皋), and Wangxi (望溪), was a Chinese nobleman, courtier, orator, philosopher, poet, scholar, author and government official of the Qing dynasty. He is best known as a founder of the Tongcheng school of literary prose which was influential during the mid-Qing dynasty.

== Family origins ==
Fang Bao was born in Tongcheng, Zongyang County, Anhui Province in 1668 during the reign of the Kangxi Emperor. He was the second son in a family of the Qing nobility with landed interests at Jiangning, Liuhe County and at Tongcheng, an area in the southern vicinity of Nanjing.

His father was Fang Zhongshu (方仲舒), an imperial official and second son of Fang's grandfather. His paternal grandfather was Fang Zhi (方帜), a Xinghua County didactic and noted scholar of the Wuhe discipline. Fang Bao was the middle son of three boys, his elder brother was Fang Zhou (方舟; 1665–1701), a scholar of the Five Classics, and his younger brother was Fang Lin (方林).

== Early life ==
At the time of Fang Bao's birth, the Kangxi Emperor had not yet fully assumed power and the real dominance over the throne was in the hands of two of the Four Regents, Ebilun and Oboi. In 1669, as the Kangxi Emperor consolidated power, Oboi was also brought up on imperial charges and put to death.

Fang Bao studied literature at a school which followed the teachings of Gui Youguang. He would go on to invent the concept of Yi Fa (義法) where Yi refers to the ideas or concept of an article and Fa to the structure and literary form. This concept is considered one of the basic theories of the Tongcheng School form of writing, which gained its name due to Tongcheng being Fang Bao's hometown.

From 1692 to 1695, Fang served in Beijing as a senior licentiate together with his friend Zhang Boxing, who shared his philosophical allegiance surrounding the teachings of Cheng Yi and Zhu Xi.

Fang obtained his jinshi degree or advanced scholar degree following the imperial examination system in 1706 under the reign of the Kangxi Emperor and was given a posting at the Hall of Military Prowess (武英殿) as its Director-General of Compilation (修書總裁). He was promoted within the Hall to the position of Instructor-Bachelor (教習庶吉士) and then to Vice-Minister of Rites (禮部侍郎).

In either 1711 or 1713, whilst still at the Hall of Military Prowess, Fang was involved in the Nanshan Case (南山案). The legal action surrounded the contents of a work written by Dai Mingshi (戴名世) – Fang's relative through marriage – titled Nanshan Ji (南山集), for which Fang had written a preface. The book was essentially a nostalgic history of one of the author's ancestors who had fought with Wu Sangui against the Qing Empire. As a result of a political realignment, the work had been judged seditious by the court of the Kangxi Emperor, who previously promoted scholarly officials. The political change on the part of the Qing court was due in large part to the emperor's awareness and perception of threat from political factions that were forming for the purpose of influencing the imperial succession. Fang was arrested by the Mayor of Suzhou, his friend Zhang Boxing. Dai was executed by imperial order, but Fang was spared death and punished instead with dismissal from his post and exile to Gansu Province or (likely both) with the imprisonment of his entire family. Zhang would also later be accused of aiding Fang Bao before the court but he was unpunished.

In the prison there were four old cells. Each cell had five rooms. The jail guards lived in the center with a window in the front of their quarters for light. At the end of this room there was another opening for ventilation. There were no such windows for the other four rooms and yet more than two hundred prisoners were always confined there. Each day toward dusk, the cells were locked and the odor of the urine and excrement would mingle with that of the food and drink. Moreover, in the coldest months of the winter, the poor prisoners had to sleep on the ground and when the spring breezes came everyone got sick. The established rule in the prison was that the door would be unlocked only at dawn. During the night, the living and the dead slept side by side with no room to turn their bodies and this is why so many people became infected. ... Among three of my cellmates who were beaten with clubs, one paid thirty taels [i.e. ounces of silver] and his bones were only slightly damaged and he was sick for two months; another paid double and his skin was hurt but he recovered in twenty days; the third paid five times more and was able to walk as usual that very night. Someone asked the beater, “Since some of the prisoners are rich and others poor but all give something, why draw a distinction in punishing them simply because of their payments?” The answer was, “If there was no difference, who would pay more?”
— Fang Bao, Random Notes From Prison, DC, 39-41

In 1728, the death of an Eleuth leader provided an excuse for the new Yongzheng Emperor to continue his father's wars in Gansu Province. Fang Bao had written a bold critique of the Governor of Gansu Province, Xu Rong and the Yongzheng Emperor's strategy with regards to the effects of the war on the people of the region. Despite this writing, by the end of the Yongzheng era, Fang was back in the imperial court's favor and he was promoted to Vice-Director of the Board of Rights.

Fang Bao's critical work of the Yongzheng Emperor proved influential in around 1735 when the incoming Qianlong Emperor used it to indict Xu Rong as a part of his larger purge of government officials to cement his hold on power. Accordingly, Fang was made the Vice-Director of the Bureau for the compilation of the Three Ritual Classics. In this role, he gained imperial support to pursue one of his most famous works, the "Imperial Anthology of Essays on the Four Books" which transformed the entire imperial writing system.

== Death and legacy ==
Fang Bao died in 1749. One of his lasting contributions to the imperial system apart from his literary writings was the establishment of the guwen style as the essay style of the imperial civil service examination system which thereafter put emphasis on Song dynasty neo-Confucian theory. This influence drastically changed the imperial civil service examination system which imposed standards and made the guwen (古文) essays the foundational part of scholarly writing across the Qing Empire.

Fang Bao is an ancestor of Fang Gongcheng, a tutor of the Qing imperial court, of Fang Guancheng, the Viceroy of Zhili, of Fang Chih, the influential cold war-era statesman of the Republic of China, Fang Dongmei a.k.a. Thomé H. Fang, a 20th century Taiwanese neo-Confucian philosopher, and of Anna Sui, the American fashion designer.

== Published works ==
The following is an incomplete list of the works of Fang Bao.

- Fang Bao's Random Notes From Prison (獄中雜記)
- Biographies of Four Gentlemen, Si Junzi Zhuan (四君子傳)
- Critique and Punctuation of the Zuo Zuoshi Pingdian (做事評點)
- Zhouguan Jizheng (周官集證)
- Zhouguan Xiyi (周官析疑)
- Zhouguan Bian (周官辨)
- Yili Xiyi (儀禮析疑)
- Kaogongji Xiyi (考工記析疑)
- Liji Xiyi (禮記析疑)
- Chunqiu Zhijie (春秋直解)
- Sangli Huowen (喪禮或問)
- Chunqiu Tonglun (春秋通論)
- Chunqiu Bishi Mulu (春秋比事目錄)
- Zuozhuan Yifa Juyao (左傳義法舉要)
- Shiji Zhu Buzheng (史記注補正)
- Li sao Zhengyi (離騷正義)
- Wangxi Wenji (望溪文集)
