= Hung Lan-yu =

Chinese politician (1900–1958)

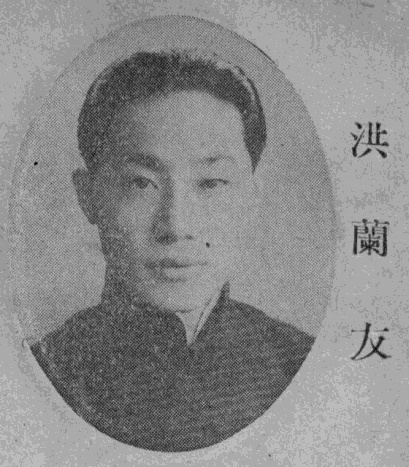
An image of Hung published in the Minguo Mingren Tujian in 1937

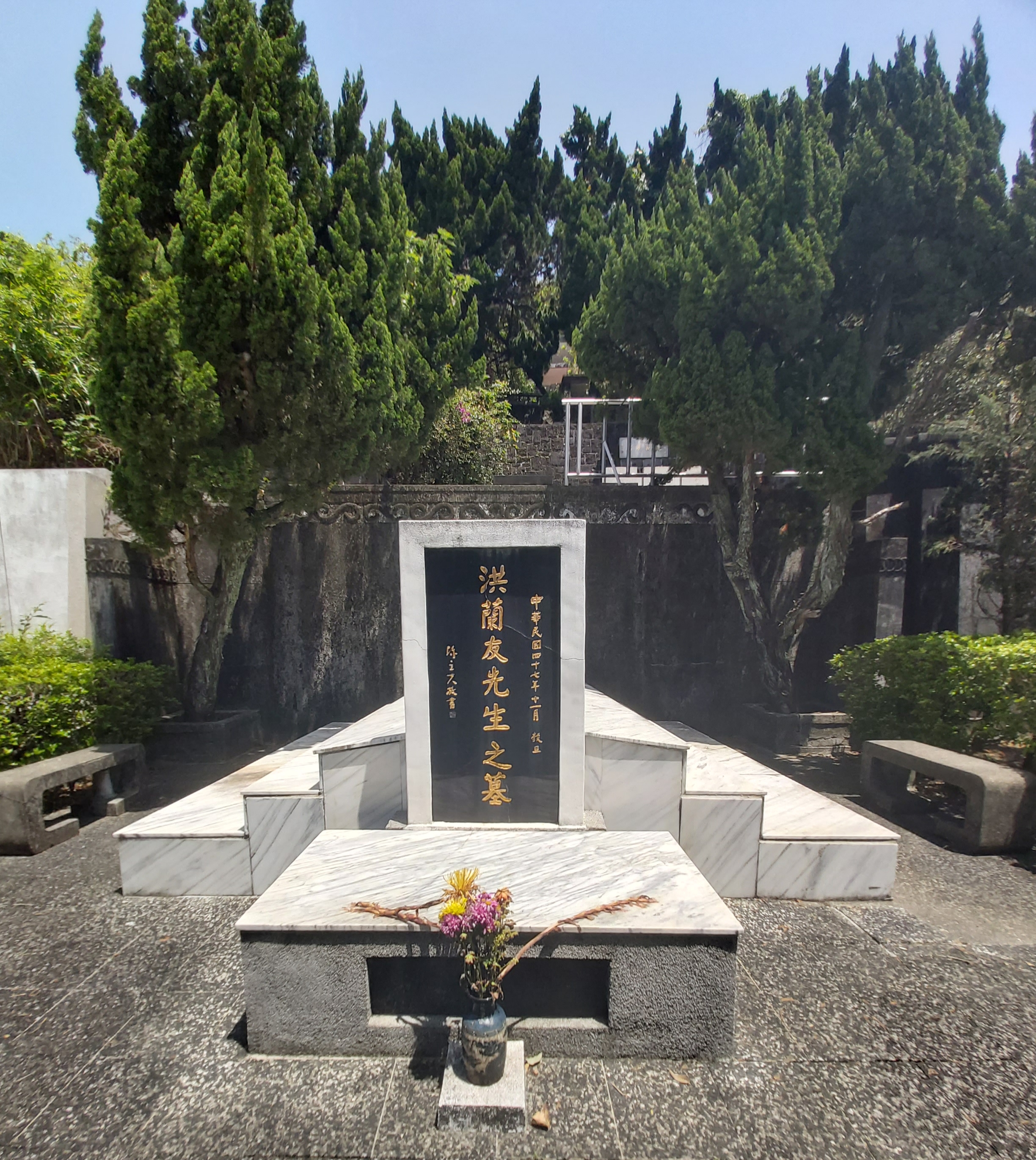
Tomb of Hung Lan-yu

Hung Lan-yu (Chinese: 洪蘭友; 1900–1958) was a Chinese politician.

== Life and career ==
Hung, a Jiangsu native born in 1900, studied law at Aurora University in Shanghai. He was a member of the Kuomintang affiliated with the CC Clique who served as an executive in several party committees. Hung was appointed the first secretary general of the National Assembly in November 1947. In addition, he served as Minister of the Interior from December 1948 to April 1949. Hung retained the position of secretary-general of the National Assembly after retreating to Taiwan with other officials of the government of the Republic of China, and remained in office until his death in Taipei on 28 September 1958.
