= Wang Buwen =

Wang Buwen 王步文
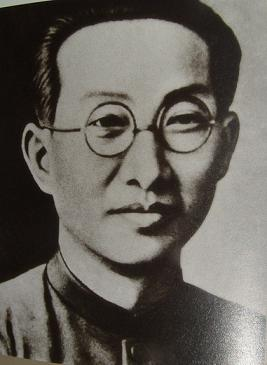
- Born: January 15, 1898; Anqing, Anhui Province, Qing Empire
- Died: May 31, 1931 (aged 33); Anqing, Anhui Province, Republic of China
- Other name: 王伟模
- Political party: Chinese Communist Party
- Spouse: Fang Qikun

Wang Buwen (zh: 王步文, pinyin: Wáng Bùwén) (b. 13 January 1898 - d. 31 May 1931) was a Communist Chinese politician in service during the Republic of China.

== Biography ==
Wang was born in 1898 in Anqing, Anhui Province during the late Qing Empire. After completing his high school in Anhui, Wang pursued his university studies in Tokyo, Empire of Japan where he joined a Communist Youth Group and began agitating against rival groups run by Fang Chih.

After returning to Anhui in 1927, he became a key figure in the CCP Anhui Provincial Interim Committee. In 1929, he was transferred to serve as the CCP Central Inspector for the province. In 1931, he became a founding member of the CCP's Anhui Provincial Committee as its Deputy Secretary of Propaganda, Chief Minister and Party Secretary

== Death ==
In April 1931, Wang was swept up in a KMT purge of Anhui's communists started in 1929. He was executed by firing squad at the Anqing Horses Pond Prison on 31 May.
