= Ko Yu-chin =

Taiwanese politician

Ko Yu-chin (Chinese: 葛雨琴; born 1939) is a Taiwanese politician.

== Education and career ==
Ko studied law at Soochow University before attending the Institute of Revolutionary Practice. She worked for Chunghwa Post and served as secretary-general of the Republic of China Postal Workers' Union before moving to the Chinese Federation of Labor, as its executive director. Ko was appointed to the Legislative Yuan as a representative of laborers affiliated with the Kuomintang. After functional constituencies were phased out, Ko was reelected to the Legislative Yuan in 1992 and 1995 via the Kuomintang party list. She subsequently served as general secretary of the Chinese Association for Relief and Ensuing Services, and later became its honorary chairman.
