= Jegal Sam =

South Korean pianist (born 1925)

Jegal Sam (Korean: 제갈삼; Hanja: 諸葛森, born November 1925) is a South Korean pianist, known as one of the oldest in the country. As a first-generation pianist, he served as vice chairman of the South Korea Music Association, music director of the Busan International Music Festival, and chairman of the promotion association.

Jegal was born in Masan in November 1925, during the Japanese colonial period. After graduating from elementary school, he went to Daegu Normal School (a five-year middle and high school educational institution), and was selected as a piano specialist at the age of 14. Jegal started his music teacher career at Suchang Elementary School in Daegu at the age of 19 after graduation, and the Korean War broke out. Luckily, due to his identity as a teacher, he was not forcibly conscripted. Afterwards, Jegal worked as a music teacher at Busan Girls' Middle School and Gyeongnam Girls' High School before retiring in 1991 as a professor of music department at Pusan National University. After his retirement, he has continued to perform. Due to his old age, his eyesight is so bad that he cannot see his sheet music. As the result, he relies on his memory to play music. In July 2020, he took on a new challenge, holding a concert to challenge a Guinness record, a solo concert done by the oldest pianist.
