= Chinese Association for Relief and Ensuing Services =

Non-governmental organization

- 中華救助總會
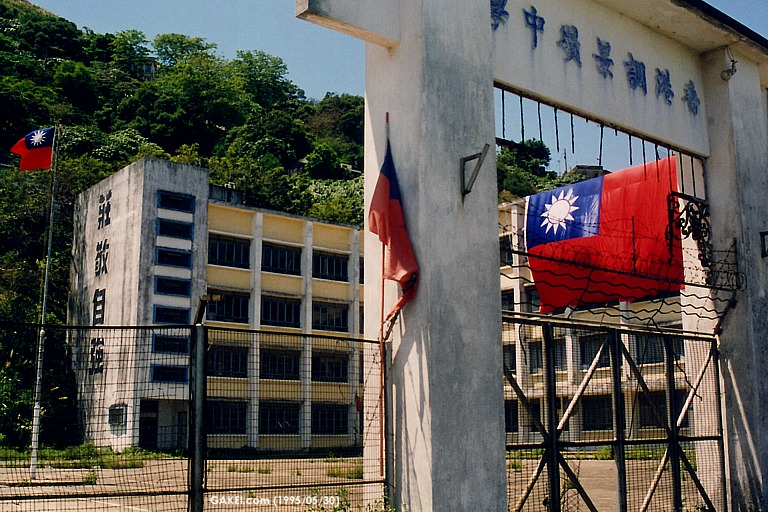
- Rennie's Mill Middle School prior to its destruction in 1995 built and maintained largely through FCRA funding.
- Abbreviation: FCRA
- Formation: 1949
- Founder: Soong Mei-ling; Chen Cheng; Hu Shih; Ku Cheng-kang; Fang Chih
- Founded at: Taipei, Republic of China
- Headquarters: 7F No 4 Chung Hsaio W Road, SEC 1, Taipei
- Honorary Chairman: Ko Yu-chin
- Chairman of the Board: Chang Cheng-chung (張正中)
- Website: www.cares.org.tw
- Formerly called: Free China Relief Association (中國大陸災胞救濟總會)

The Chinese Association for Relief and Ensuing Services (also known as the CARES) (Chinese: 中華救助總會), formerly the Free China Relief Association (中國大陸災胞救濟總會), is a non-governmental organization headquartered in Taipei, Republic of China (Taiwan). The organization specializes in forced migration, refugee assistance and disaster relief.

== History ==
The Free China Relief Association was founded in 1949 and incorporated on 4 April 1950, as the "Mainland China Relief Association" (中國大陸災胞救濟總會), following the defeat and retreat of the Republic of China from the mainland. The Association was tasked with providing assistance to frontline troops, the many refugees fleeing the Mainland after the war, assisting the Nationalist insurgents operating within mainland China and generally promoting the values of free China on behalf of the ROC.

The articles of association listed 100 people as directors including Ju Zheng, Soong Mei-ling, Ku Cheng-kang, Fu Ssu-nien, Fang Chih, Chen Chi-tien, Wan Hung-tu, and Zheng Yanfen. An additional 61 people were listed as supervisors including Yu Youren, Zou Lu, Chiang Monlin, Yu Jiaju, Chhoà Pôe-hóe, Huang Chaoqin (黃朝琴) and Chen Wei-ping. The first meeting took place between 12 and 24 April 1950.

=== 1950s ===
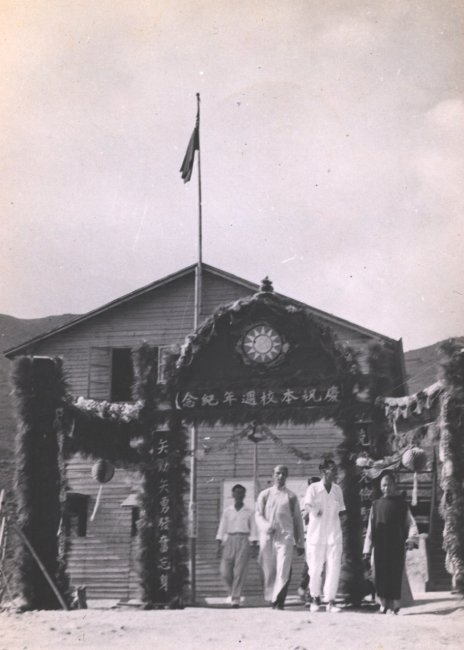
The refugee camp at Rennie's Mill, Hong Kong in 1951.

In 1950, with the CCP was strengthening its hold over the former Republic of China. The FCRA conducted hundreds of operations to airdrop 70,000 tons of rice from Taiwan and anti-Communist propaganda leaflets throughout Eastern China. These drops were called "Mainland Disaster Relief Drops From Taiwanese Compatriots" beginning a long history of operations involving supply airdrops by FCRA in Greater China and Southeast Asia.

In May 1950, the FCRA raised US$10 million with the goal of aiding refugees in British Hong Kong who had set up a camp at Rennie's Mill.

In summer of 1952, the FCRA was informed that the Social Welfare Office of British Hong Kong intended to end food rationing at the Rennie's Mill camp the following year in an effort to disperse the camp's inhabitants. The move by British authorities created a vacuum of authority which was filled by the FCRA and the ROC government by extension, essentially creating an enclave of the Republic of China inside British Hong Kong that would last until around 1997.

=== 1960s ===
In May 1960, the FCRA hoarded around 100,000 tons of rice in an attempt to ship it to the Mainland. The offer was rejected by the PRC, after which the FCRA prepared around 10,000 ration kits, each weighing around 1 pound, to be airlifted and dropped or otherwise smuggled into the mainland. Chiang Kai-shek said the following of the PRC's attempt to ignore the Nationalist relief offer:

...then my government will take every possible risk to deliver relief supplies to the mainland on our own initiative, by land, sea or air

— Chiang Kai-shek, Lawrence Daily Journal World (31 January 1961)

=== 1970s ===
In 1971, the ROC was expelled from the United Nations and replaced with the PRC. Despite this, the Free China Relief Association conducted an operation to send 170,000 balloons filled with relief aid and propaganda leaflets across the Strait to the Mainland in collaboration with the Ministry of National Defense after the 1976 Tangshan earthquake. The move was made following an official rejection of aid shipments from the ROC by the PRC.

=== 1980s ===
In the 1980s, the association provided the Kuomintang-affiliated Yunnanese communities in Northern Thailand with assistance in Chinese language education, including textbooks, teachers, and teacher training, as well as economic assistance.

In 1984 the organization gave financial and lifepath assistance to the hijackers of CAAC Flight 296.

In 1988, the FCRA sent the PRC US$100,000 to help Chinese flood victims. This marked the first successful instance of direct humanitarian assistance to the PRC from an ROC institution.

=== 1990s ===
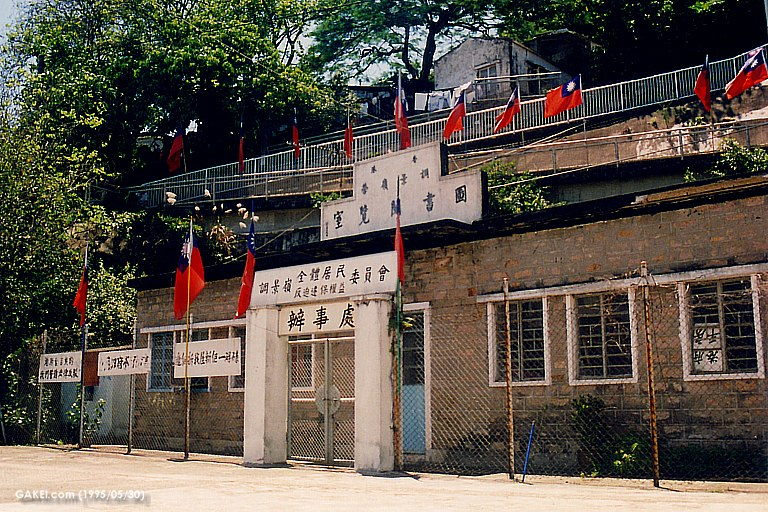
The Rennie's Mill Village Anti Clearance Committee building prior to its destruction in 1995.

In 1991, the association changed its name to the China Relief Association (中國災胞救助總會).

In July 1992, the FCRA donated US$300,000 to the Chinese Red Cross after a series of floods and droughts had affected six mainland Chinese provinces.

In December 1993, the association donated NT $1,371,767 to benefit the victims of a tsunami that struck South Asia.

=== 2000s ===
In 2000, the association re-branded itself as the Chinese Association for Relief and Ensuing Services or "CARES" (中華救助總會) after significant downsizing and a transition away from international relief work, transforming itself effectively into an internal social welfare organisation with some international work still ongoing.

=== 2010s ===
The organisation's mission currently includes assisting the integration of Mainland spouses into Taiwanese society, providing services to disadvantaged, elderly and aboriginal groups on Taiwan, providing emergency relief to the same groups including care and assisted living services, participation in international humanitarian work, providing assistance to former refugees and their descendants in Thailand and Burma and Organising a regularly held Social Welfare Forum to improve existing welfare services.

=== 2020s ===
In early 2020, the Democratic Progressive Party government concluded that organisation was a Kuomintang party asset and froze its finances.

== Publications ==
- Employment Services and Vocational Assistance of Chinese Refugees in Taiwan. Taipei: Free China Relief Association. 1956.
- FCRA Relief Work in Kinmen & Matsu. Taipei: Free China Relief Association. 1956.
- The Voice of Refugees from the Chinese Mainland. Taipei: Free China Relief Association. 1958.
- Resettlement of War Disabled Refugees. A Significant Project Completed by FCRA in Cooperation with FERP-U.S.E.P. (Illustrated ed.). Taipei: Free China Relief Association. 1958.
- The Mass Exodus of May 1962. Taipei: Free China Relief Association. 1962.
- FCRA Relief Work in Hongkong and Macao. Taipei: Free China Relief Association. 1965.
