= Pi Yi-shu =

Chinese politician (1905–1974)

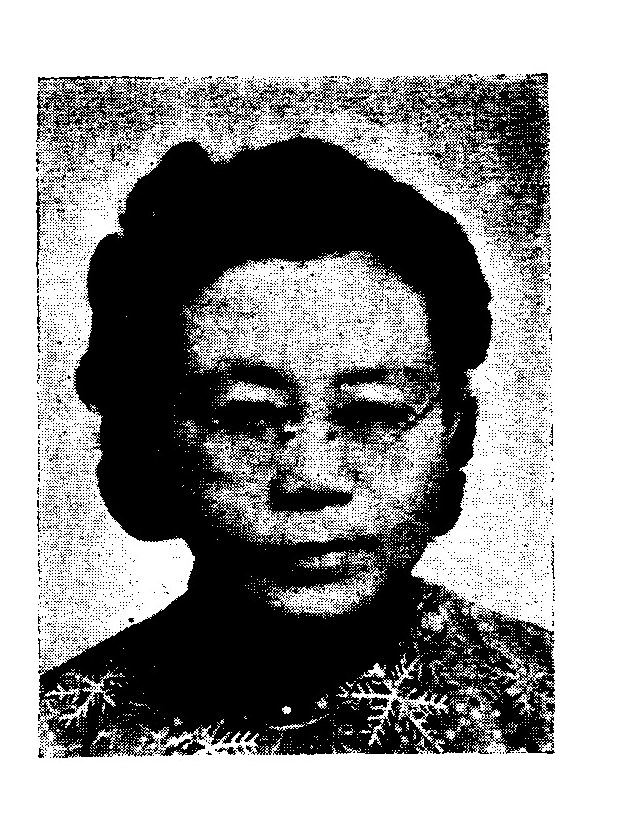

Member of the Legislative Yuan
- In office 1948–1974
- Constituency: Sichuan

Personal details
- Born: 1904
- Died: 1974 (aged 69–70)

Pi Yi-shu (Chinese: 皮以書, 1904–1974) was a Chinese politician. She was among the first group of women elected to the Legislative Yuan in 1948.

== Biography ==
Originally from Nanchuan County in Sichuan province, Pi graduated from the University of China in Peking and then attended Moscow Sun Yat-sen University. She joined the Kuomintang and became head of the women's section of the party's central committee. She also served as chair of the women's steering committee of the New Life Movement's Shaanxi chapter. During the Second Sino-Japanese War she was president of the Shaanxi branch of the Chinese Women's Service and Anti-Japanese War Soldiers Association and headed the provincial branch of the Chinese Wartime Childcare Association. She married Ku Cheng-ting, a prominent Kuomintang politician.

The chair of the women's committee of the Shaanxi branch of the Kuomintang, Pi was a delegate to the 1946 Constituent National Assembly that drew up the constitution of the Republic of China. She became a member of the Kuomintang central committee and served as director general of the Chinese Women's Anti-Communist Federation. She was a Kuomintang candidate in Sichuan in the 1948 elections for the Legislative Yuan, with five women to be elected from the province. Pi finished sixth, but the election of Nie Yanghua (who had finished fourth) was declared invalid and Pi replaced her in parliament. Her husband was also elected to the legislature and the couple relocated to Taiwan during the Chinese Civil War. During the 1950s she was an advisor to the Chinese delegation at the thirteenth United Nations General Assembly. She remained a member of the Legislative Yuan until her death in 1974.
