= Tongcheng school =

The Tongcheng school (Chinese: 桐城派; pinyin: Tóngchéng pài; Wade–Giles: T'ung-ch'eng p'ai) was a Chinese literary school that flourished during the Qing dynasty advocating the philosophy of the Neo-Confucian values that rose to prominence during the Song dynasty.

== History ==
The Tongcheng school of literary prose was founded by Fang Bao, Liu Dakui (劉大櫆), and Yao Nai who were natives of Tongcheng Country (now Tongcheng, Anhui), Anhui Province in the early years of the Qing dynasty.

Fang Bao initiated the genre using what he had learned from his teacher Gui Youguang, creating the concept of Yi Fa. Yi refers to the central ideas or arguments within an article, and Fa to the various literary forms and artistry that are present in the theory of the Tongcheng school. The style of writing was more stoic and pragmatic in nature in that it stressed the need to present the purpose of the article in a concise manner without excessive pomp or romance in the writing style.

The school rose to prominence under the Kangxi Emperor and prospered throughout the Qing period. Significant originating writings of the school include Fang Bao's Random Notes from Prison and Yao Nai's Ascent to Mount Tai.

The school was fiercely attacked by the May 4th Movement for employment of the dead language and restriction to anything new and modern, thus accused of being "bad seed" to the people.

== Writers ==
Significant authors of the Tongcheng style include Fang Bao's students: Shen Tong, Wang Youpu, Shen Tingfang, Wang Zhaofu, Chen Dashou and Li Xueyu; Liu Dakui's students: Wang Zhuo, Wu Ding and Cheng Jinfang; and Yao Nai's students: Guan Tong, Men Cengliang, Fang Dongshu and Yao Ying. Other notable adherents to the Tongcheng school include Zhu Qi, Long Qirui, Chen Xueshou, Wu Jiabin, Deng Xianhe, Sun Dingchen, Lu Yitong and Shao Yichen.
