= Tongcheng, Anhui =

Tongcheng 桐城市 Tungcheng
- County-level city
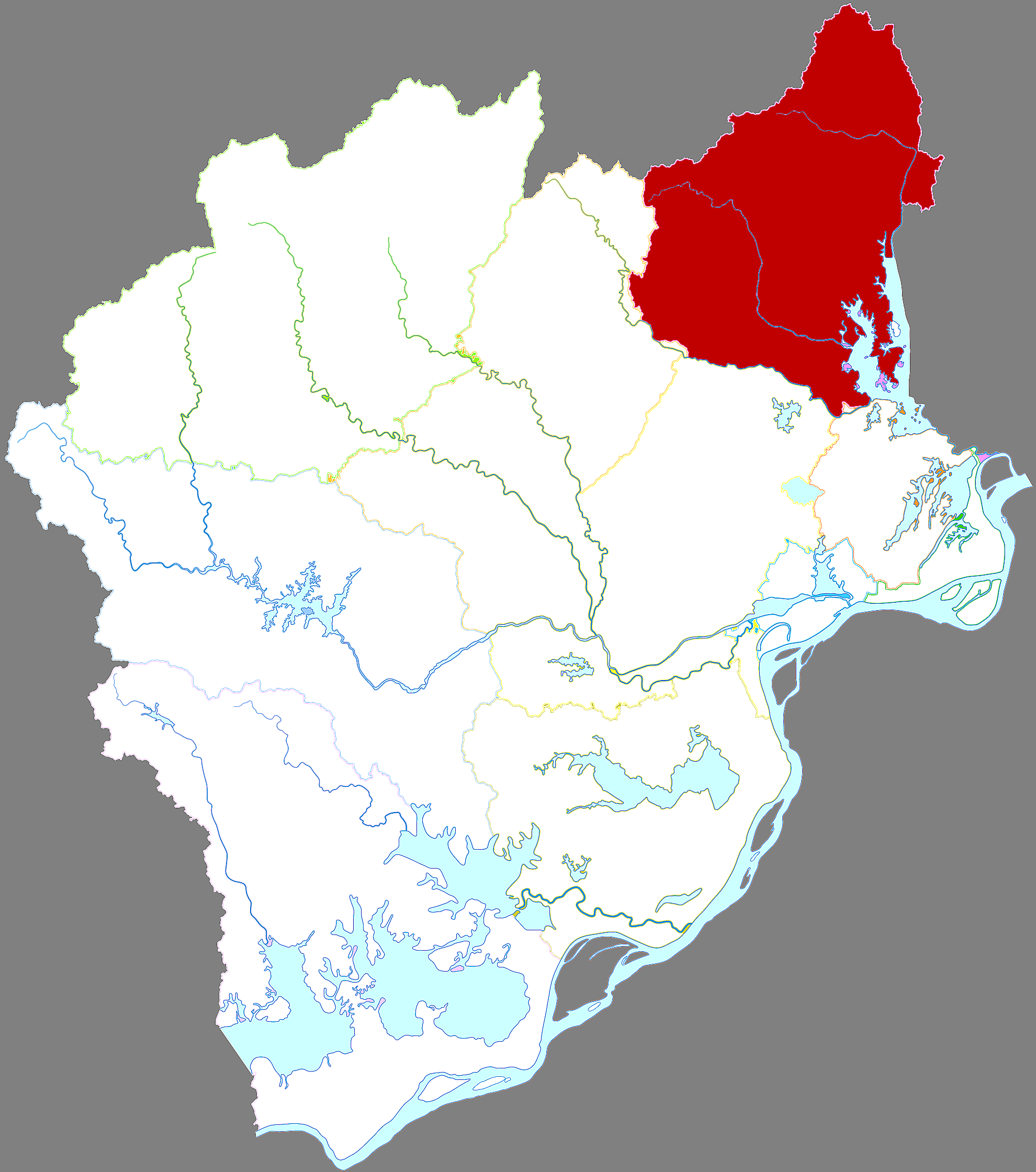
- Tongcheng in Anqing

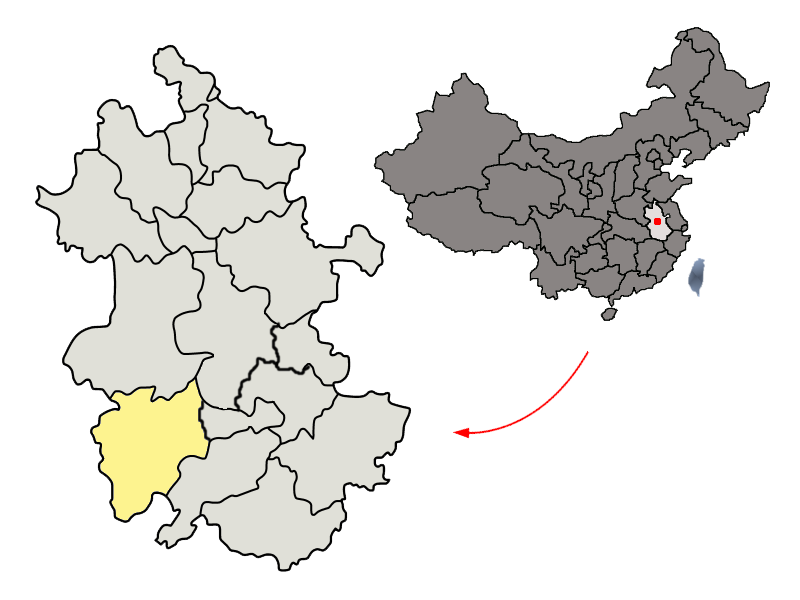
- Anqing in Anhui
- Coordinates: 31°02′09″N 116°56′12″E
- Country: China
- Province: Anhui
- Prefecture-level city: Anqing
- Municipal seat: Wenchang Subdistrict

Area
  - Total: 1,472 km^{2} (568 sq mi)

Population (2020)
  - Total: 593,629
  - Density: 403.3/km^{2} (1,044/sq mi)
- Time zone: UTC+8 (China Standard)
- Postal code: 231400

Tongcheng (Chinese: 桐城; pinyin: Tóngchéng) is a county-level city and former county in the southwest of Anhui province and is under the jurisdiction of the prefecture-level city of Anqing. Tongcheng is noted for the Tongcheng School, one of influenced Neo-Confucian schools during the Qing era.

== Administrative divisions ==
Tongcheng City has jurisdiction over 3 subdistricts, 12 towns and 2 others.

Subdistricts

- Longteng Subdistrict (龙腾街道)
- Wenchang Subdistrict (文昌街道)
- Longmin Subdistrict (龙眠街道)

Towns

- Xindu (新渡镇)
- Shuanggang (双港镇)
- Qingcao (青草镇)
- Kongcheng (孔城镇)
- Daguan (大关镇)
- Fangang (范岗镇)
- Jinshen (金神镇)
- Lüting (吕亭镇)
- Tangwan (唐湾镇)
- Huangjia (黄甲镇)
- Xunyu (鲟鱼镇)
- Xizihu (嬉子湖镇)

Others

- Tongcheng Economic Development Zone (桐城经济开发区)
- Tongcheng Shuangxin Economic Development Zone (桐城双新经济开发区)

== Climate ==
Climate data for Tongcheng, elevation 85 m (279 ft), (1991–2020 normals, extremes 1981–present)
| Month | Jan | Feb | Mar | Apr | May | Jun | Jul | Aug | Sep | Oct | Nov | Dec | Year |
|---|---|---|---|---|---|---|---|---|---|---|---|---|---|
| Record high °C (°F) | 19.9 (67.8) | 26.0 (78.8) | 32.2 (90.0) | 32.4 (90.3) | 34.5 (94.1) | 36.8 (98.2) | 38.7 (101.7) | 39.0 (102.2) | 35.9 (96.6) | 32.4 (90.3) | 28.3 (82.9) | 21.4 (70.5) | 39.0 (102.2) |
| Mean daily maximum °C (°F) | 7.6 (45.7) | 10.4 (50.7) | 15.2 (59.4) | 21.5 (70.7) | 26.3 (79.3) | 28.8 (83.8) | 31.8 (89.2) | 31.5 (88.7) | 27.7 (81.9) | 22.6 (72.7) | 16.6 (61.9) | 10.2 (50.4) | 20.8 (69.5) |
| Daily mean °C (°F) | 3.5 (38.3) | 6.0 (42.8) | 10.4 (50.7) | 16.4 (61.5) | 21.4 (70.5) | 24.6 (76.3) | 27.7 (81.9) | 27.3 (81.1) | 23.2 (73.8) | 17.6 (63.7) | 11.5 (52.7) | 5.5 (41.9) | 16.3 (61.3) |
| Mean daily minimum °C (°F) | 0.3 (32.5) | 2.6 (36.7) | 6.4 (43.5) | 12.0 (53.6) | 17.0 (62.6) | 21.1 (70.0) | 24.4 (75.9) | 24.0 (75.2) | 19.8 (67.6) | 13.9 (57.0) | 7.7 (45.9) | 2.1 (35.8) | 12.6 (54.7) |
| Record low °C (°F) | −9.7 (14.5) | −8.1 (17.4) | −5.3 (22.5) | 1.5 (34.7) | 6.3 (43.3) | 12.6 (54.7) | 17.9 (64.2) | 16.5 (61.7) | 11.3 (52.3) | 1.4 (34.5) | −5.4 (22.3) | −10.8 (12.6) | −10.8 (12.6) |
| Average precipitation mm (inches) | 45.0 (1.77) | 59.8 (2.35) | 96.6 (3.80) | 125.9 (4.96) | 140.9 (5.55) | 239.6 (9.43) | 222.6 (8.76) | 166.3 (6.55) | 79.5 (3.13) | 52.5 (2.07) | 46.3 (1.82) | 31.8 (1.25) | 1,306.8 (51.44) |
| Average precipitation days (≥ 0.1 mm) | 9.3 | 9.8 | 12.3 | 11.3 | 12.1 | 13.3 | 12.8 | 12.9 | 8.6 | 7.8 | 8.4 | 7.4 | 126 |
| Average snowy days | 4.8 | 2.6 | 0.9 | 0 | 0 | 0 | 0 | 0 | 0 | 0 | 0.4 | 1.6 | 10.3 |
| Average relative humidity (%) | 72 | 72 | 72 | 72 | 75 | 82 | 83 | 82 | 78 | 73 | 72 | 70 | 75 |
| Mean monthly sunshine hours | 109.0 | 107.8 | 125.4 | 154.9 | 167.4 | 141.1 | 180.4 | 182.8 | 155.5 | 153.7 | 137.8 | 128.5 | 1,744.3 |
| Percentage possible sunshine | 34 | 34 | 34 | 40 | 39 | 33 | 42 | 45 | 42 | 44 | 44 | 41 | 39 |
Source: China Meteorological Administration

== Notable people ==
- Zhang Tingyu, advisor and paramount minister to three Qing Dynasty emperors
- Chu Bo, the former governor of Hunan Province, and currently party chief in Inner Mongolia, was born in Tongcheng.
- Fang Bao, author
- Fang Lanfen, author
- Fang Quan, author, Qing prefect
- Fang Chih, Chinese diplomat
- Gui Congyou, diplomat, appointed China's ambassador to Sweden in 2017
- Wang Wenbin, diplomat, one of the spokesperson for the Ministry of Foreign Affairs
- Zuo Guangdou, late Ming Dynasty censorate official
