= Mayor of Beijing =

Chinese local government leader

Mayor of the Beijing Municipal People's Government
- 北京市人民政府市长
- National Emblem of China

- Flag of China

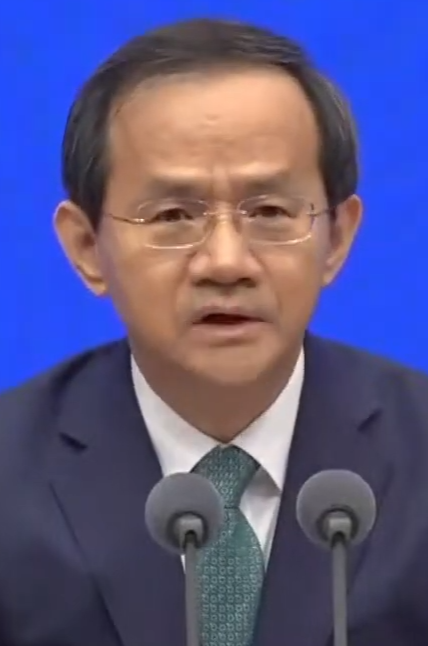
- Incumbent; Yin Yong since October 28, 2022
- Beijing Municipal People's Government
- Type: Head of government
- Status: Provincial and ministerial-level official
- Reports to: Beijing Municipal People's Congress and its Standing Committee
- Nominator: Presidium of the Beijing Municipal People's Congress
- Appointer: Beijing Municipal People's Congress
- Term length: Five years, renewable
- Inaugural holder: Ye Jianying
- Formation: 8 December 1948
- Deputy: Deputy Mayors; Secretary-General

The mayor of Beijing, officially the Mayor of the Beijing Municipal People's Government, is the head of Beijing Municipality and leader of the Beijing Municipal People's Government.

The mayor is elected by the Beijing Municipal People's Congress, and responsible to it and its Standing Committee. The mayor is a provincial level official and is responsible for the overall decision-making of the municipal government. The mayor is assisted by an executive vice mayor as well as several vice mayors. They generally serve as the deputy secretary of the Beijing Municipal Committee of the Chinese Communist Party and as a member of the CCP Central Committee. The mayor is the second-highest-ranking official in the city after the secretary of the CCP Beijing Committee. The current mayor is Yin Yong, who took office on 28 October 2022.

== List of mayors ==
=== Republic of China ===
No.	Officeholder	Term of office	
No.	Officeholder	Took office	Left office
Governor of the Shuntian Prefecture
1	Ding Naiyang (1870–1944)	1 January 1912	24 December 1912
2	Zhang Guangjian (1864–1938)	24 December 1912	19 September 1913
3	Wang Zhixin (1868–1914)	16 October 1913	23 March 1914
4	Shen Jinjian (1875–1924)	23 March 1914	1914
Capital Administrative Officier
(4)	Shen Jinjian (1875–1924)	1914	September 1915
5	Wang Da (1881–1946)	26 September 1915	3 August 1920
6	Wang Hu (1865–1933)	3 August 1920	18 September 1920
7	Sun Zhenjia (1858–?)	18 September 1920	19 May 1922
8	Liu Menggeng (1881–?)	19 May 1922	5 November 1924
9	Wang Zhixiang (1858–1930)	5 November 1924	31 December 1924
10	Xue Dubi (1892–1973)	31 December 1924	9 October 1925
11	Liu Ji (1887–1967)	20 October 1925	May 1926
12	Li Yuan (1879–?)	4 September 1926	24 September 1927
13	Zhang Jixin (1874–1952)	24 September 1927	3 June 1928
–	Li Shengpei (?–?)	4 June 1928	25 June 1928
Mayor of the Beiping Special Municipal Government
–	He Chengjun (1882–1961)	25 June 1928	13 July 1928
14	He Qigong (1899–1955)	13 July 1928	12 June 1929
15	Chang Yin-wu (1891–1949)	12 June 1929	27 February 1931
–	Wang Tao (1866–1937)	October 1930	March 1931
16	Zhou Dawen (1895–1971)	27 February 1931	April 1931
Mayor of the Beijing Municipal Government
–	Hu Ruoyu (1895–1962)	April 1931	June 1931
(16)	Zhou Dawen (1895–1971)	April 1931	16 June 1933
17	Yuan Liang (1883–1953)	16 June 1933	1 November 1935
18	Song Zheyuan (1885–1940)	1 November 1935	8 November 1935
19	Qin Dechun (1893–1963)	8 November 1935	28 July 1937
20	Zhang Zizhong (1891–1940)	28 July 1937	6 August 1937

==== Japanese occupation ====
No.	Officeholder	Term of office	
No.	Officeholder	Took office	Left office
Mayor of the Beiping Local Maintenance Committee and the Mayor of the Beijing Local Maintenance Committee
1	Jiang Chaozong (1861–1943)	6 August 1937	17 December 1937
Mayor of the Beijing Special Municipal Government
(1)	Jiang Chaozong (1861–1943)	1 January 1938	10 January 1938
2	Yu Jinhe (1887–?)	10 January 1938	13 January 1938
Mayor of Beijing Special Municipality
(2)	Yu Jinhe (1887–?)	13 January 1938	9 February 1943
–	Su Tiren (1888–1979)	1941	9 February 1943
3	Liu Yushu (1884–?)	9 February 1943	1943
Mayor of the Beijing Special Municipal Government
(3)	Liu Yushu (1884–?)	1943	20 February 1945
4	Xu Xiuzhi (1881–1954)	20 February 1945	16 August 1945

==== After World War II ====
No.	Officeholder	Term of office	
No.	Officeholder	Took office	Left office
Mayor of the Beijing Municipal Government
1	Xiong Bin (1894–1964)	16 August 1945	15 July 1946
2	He Siyuan (1896–1982)	15 July 1946	July 1948
3	Liu Yaozhang (1897–1993)	July 1948	4 February 1949

=== People's Republic of China ===
No.	Officeholder	Term of office		Political party	Ref.
No.	Officeholder	Took office	Left office	Political party	Ref.
Mayor of the Beiping Municipal People's Government
1	Ye Jianying (1897–1986)	8 December 1948	9 September 1949	Chinese Communist Party	
2	Nie Rongzhen (1897–1986)	9 September 1949	30 September 1949	Chinese Communist Party	
Mayor of the Beijing Municipal People's Government
(2)	Nie Rongzhen (1897–1986)	30 September 1949	26 February 1951	Chinese Communist Party	
3	Peng Zhen (1902–1997)	26 February 1951	August 1954	Chinese Communist Party	
Mayor of the Beijing Municipal People's Committee
(3)	Peng Zhen (1902–1997)	August 1954	23 May 1966	Chinese Communist Party	
4	Wu De (1913–1995)	23 May 1966	20 April 1967	Chinese Communist Party	
Director of the Beijing Revolutionary Committee
5	Xie Fuzhi (1909–1972)	20 April 1967	26 March 1972	Chinese Communist Party	
6	Wu De (1913–1995)	May 1972	9 October 1978	Chinese Communist Party	
7	Lin Hujia (1916–2018)	9 October 1978	13 December 1978	Chinese Communist Party	
Mayor of the Beijing Municipal People's Government
(7)	Lin Hujia (1916–2018)	13 December 1978	25 January 1981	Chinese Communist Party	
8	Jiao Ruoyu (1915–2020)	25 January 1981	24 March 1983	Chinese Communist Party	
9	Chen Xitong (1930–2013)	24 March 1983	February 1993	Chinese Communist Party	
10	Li Qiyan (1938–2020)	February 1993	October 1996	Chinese Communist Party	
11	Jia Qinglin (born 1940)	February 1997 (acting from October 1996)	February 1999	Chinese Communist Party	
12	Liu Qi (born 1942)	February 1999	January 2003	Chinese Communist Party	
13	Meng Xuenong (born 1949)	19 January 2003	20 April 2003	Chinese Communist Party	
14	Wang Qishan (born 1948)	February 2004 (acting from 20 April 2003)	30 November 2007	Chinese Communist Party	
15	Guo Jinlong (born 1947)	January 2008 (acting from 30 November 2007)	25 July 2012	Chinese Communist Party	
16	Wang Anshun (born 1957)	28 January 2013 (acting from 25 July 2012)	31 October 2016	Chinese Communist Party	
17	Cai Qi (born 1955)	20 January 2017 (acting from 31 October 2016)	27 May 2017	Chinese Communist Party	
18	Chen Jining (born 1964)	30 January 2018 (acting from 27 May 2017)	28 October 2022	Chinese Communist Party	
19	Yin Yong (born 1969)	19 January 2023 (acting from 28 October 2022)	Incumbent	Chinese Communist Party	
