= Mayor Chen =

Mayor Chen may refer to numerous mayors:

- Chen Chi-mai (born 1964), 3rd Mayor of Kaohsiung
- Chen Chu (born 1950), 3rd Mayor of Kaohsiung City (before) and 1st Mayor of Kaohsiung (after)
- Chen Jining (born 1964), Mayor of Beijing (2017–2022)
- Chen Shui-bian (born 1950), 1st Mayor of Taipei
- Chen Xitong (1930–2013), Mayor of Beijing (1983–1993)
- Chen Yi (marshal) (1901–1972), 8th Mayor of Shanghai
