= Jiang Chaozong =

Chinese general, politician (1861–1943)

- 江朝宗
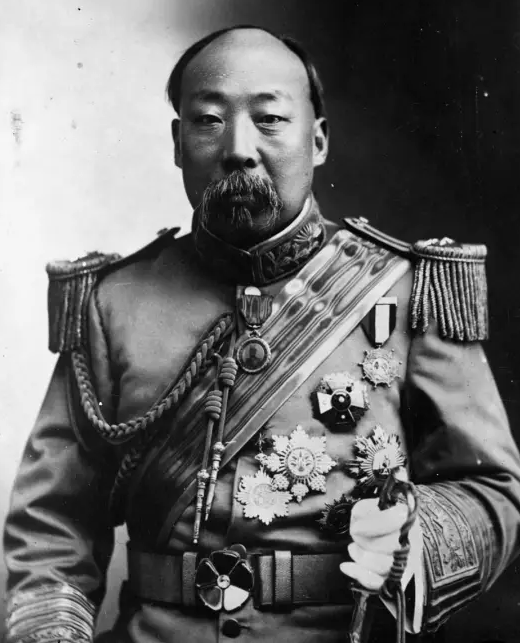
- Jiang in military regalia

Acting Premier of China
- In office 12 June – 24 June 1917
- President: Li Yuanhong
- Preceded by: Wu Tingfang (acting)
- Succeeded by: Li Jingxi

Mayor of Beijing
- In office 6 August 1937 – 10 January 1938
- Preceded by: Zhang Zizhong
- Succeeded by: Yu Jinhe

Personal details
- Born: 1861 Jingde, Anhui, Great Qing
- Died: 20 September 1943 (aged 81–82) Peiping, Republic of China (Japanese Occupation)
- Awards: Order of Rank and Merit; Order of the Precious Brilliant Golden Grain; Order of Wen-Hu

Military service
- Allegiance: Qing dynasty; (Republic of China (1912–1949)) Republic of China; Empire of China
- Branch/service: Huai Army; Beiyang Army
- Rank: General
- Battles/wars: First Sino-Japanese War; 1911 Revolution; Second Sino-Japanese War

Jiang Chaozong (Chinese: 江朝宗; pinyin: Jiāng Cháozōng; Wade–Giles: Chiang Ch'ao-tsung; Hepburn: Kō Kōketsu; 1861–1943) was a general in the late Empire of China and an acting Premier of China in 1917.

== Biography ==
A native of Xuancheng, Anhui, China, Jiang was posted to Taiwan early in his career to serve the Qing governor Liu Mingchuan. However, he was charged with corruption, and was forced to return to the mainland in 1889. He later entered the service of Yuan Shikai and was posted to Nanzheng, Shaanxi, Jiang was contacted by Huang Chaoyong who asked for military help in crushing an uprising by the Gelaohui secret society. The Yang Xian militia leader was then approached by Jiang for assistance. With the start of the Xinhai Revolution, the fled to Beijing, where he was protected by Zhao Bingjun. He rose rapidly through the hierarchy of the Beiyang government, becoming chief of staff of the army, and was also a close confidant of Yuan Shikai. He was on the committee for the coronation of Yuan Shikai as emperor in 1915. Jiang leased land to the missionary Ethel Margaret Phillips in Beijing in 1915.

His previous position was Chief of the Beijing Commandery and he temporarily replaced Wu Tingfang's as acting Premier from June 12 to June 24, 1917. During his tenure parliament was dissolved by his mandate. He was succeeded as Premier by Li Jingxi.

The monarchists Zhang Xun and Kang Youwei drawn up a plan for the restoration of Emperor Puyi and Qing dynasty and showed up in Beijing, drawing Jiang into their plan. On July 1, on Zhang Xun's instructions, war minister Wang Shizhen, army commander Jiang Chaozong, and former Qing dignitary Liang Qichao acted on this plan, which failed. Jiang then served on the cabinet of Qian Nengxun, but was forced from office less than a year later on charges of corruption. He then served in minor capacities within the Anhui Province under Wu Peifu and the Zhili clique.

Following the Marco Polo Bridge incident in July 1937, Jiang was sought out by the Imperial Japanese Army and was asked to come out of semi-retirement to serve as provisional mayor of Beijing. He joined to collaborationist Provisional Government of the Republic of China in December 1937. However, he was dismissed from that post after a short period, retaining a seat of the largely powerless Provisional Government Committee. With the establishment of the Reorganized Nationalist Government of the Republic of China under Wang Jingwei, he was appointed to the North China Policy Committee. Declared a traitor by the Kuomintang, Jiang died of old age in 1943.

Jiang was a member of a spirit writing organization.
