= Wang Hu =

Wang Hu may refer to:

- Uicheon (1055–1101), Buddhist monk and Munjong of Goryeo's son, born Wang Hu
- Grand Prince Danyang (fl. 14th century), Goryeo royalty
- Wang Hu (China) (1865–1933), politician during the Qing and Republican periods
