= Huainan Mining Group =

Chinese coal mining company

Huainan Mining Industry Group Co., Ltd 淮南矿业集团
- Type: Private Company
- Industry: Coal mining, thermal electricity generation, transportation, real estate
- Founded: 1981
- Headquarters: Huainan, Anhui Province, People's Republic of China
- Area served: People's Republic of China
- Key people: Deputy General Manager :Yuan Liang
- Number of employees: 58,586
- Website: Huainan Mining Group

Huainan Coal Mining Group (Chinese: 淮南矿业集团) is a coal mining company based in Huainan, Anhui, China, and is involved in bituminous and anthracite coal mining, washing, and sales, as well as other industries such as real estate and civil engineering. Previously known as the Huainan Mining Bureau, the company changed to its current name in 1998.

== Company developments ==
Huainan Mining gained approval for a new coal project from the National Energy Administration in Bojianghaizi County, Inner Mongolia, in 2015. The coal mine is estimated to yield 3 million tonnes per year, after a total investment into the project of about 2.804 billion yuan ($448.6 million).

In December 2016, China Construction Bank, the country's second biggest lender, signed a 30 billion yuan debt-for-equity framework agreement with Huainan Mining Group, to be provided over a five-year term. The agreement included the provision of financial services by CCB, including investment banking and settlement services.
