= Party Secretary of Beijing =

Municipal government position in China

Secretary of the Beijing Municipal Committee of the Chinese Communist Party
- 中国共产党北京市委员会书记
- Emblem of the Chinese Communist Party

- Flag of the Chinese Communist Party

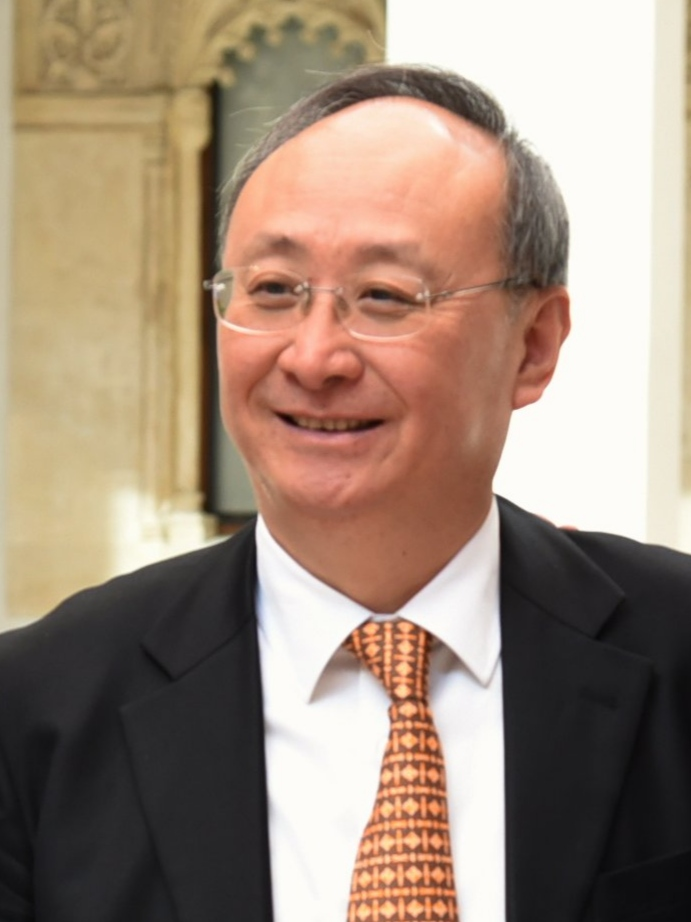
- Incumbent; Yin Li since November 13, 2022
- Beijing Municipal Committee of the Chinese Communist Party
- Type: Party Committee Secretary
- Status: Provincial and ministerial-level official
- Member of: Beijing Municipal Standing Committee
- Nominator: Central Committee
- Appointer: Beijing Municipal Committee; Central Committee
- Inaugural holder: Peng Zhen
- Formation: December 13, 1948
- Deputy: Deputy Secretary; Secretary-General

The secretary of the Beijing Municipal Committee of the Chinese Communist Party is the leader of the Beijing Municipal Committee of the Chinese Communist Party (CCP). As the CCP is the sole ruling party of the People's Republic of China (PRC), the secretary is the highest ranking post in Beijing.

The secretary is officially appointed by the CCP Central Committee based on the recommendation of the CCP Organization Department, which is then approved by the Politburo and its Standing Committee. The secretary can be also appointed by a plenary meeting of the Beijing Municipal Committee, but the candidate must be the same as the one approved by the central government. The secretary leads the Standing Committee of the Beijing Municipal Committee, and since at least 2007, the secretary has consistently been a member of the CCP Politburo. The secretary leads the work of the Municipal Committee and its Standing Committee. The secretary outranks the mayor, who is generally the deputy secretary of the committee.

The current secretary is Yin Li, a member of the CCP Politburo, who took office on 13 November 2022.

== List of party secretaries ==
No.	Image	Name	Term start	Term end	Ref.
1		Peng Zhen (彭真) (1902–1997)	13 December 1948	May 1966	
2		Li Xuefeng (李雪峰) (1907–2003)	May 1966	January 1967	
3		Xie Fuzhi (谢富治) (1909–1972)	January 1967	26 March 1972	
4		Wu De (吴德) (1913–1995)	April 1972	October 1978	
5		Lin Hujia (林乎加) (1916–2018)	October 1978	January 1981	
6		Duan Junyi (段君毅) (1910–2004)	January 1981	August 1984	
7		Li Ximing (李锡铭) (1926–2008)	August 1984	December 1992	
8		Chen Xitong (陈希同) (1930–2013)	December 1992	April 1995	
9		Wei Jianxing (尉健行) (1931–2015)	April 1995	25 August 1997	
10		Jia Qinglin (贾庆林) (born 1940)	25 August 1997	22 October 2002	
11		Liu Qi (刘淇) (born 1942)	22 October 2002	3 July 2012	
12		Guo Jinlong (郭金龙) (born 1947)	3 July 2012	27 May 2017	
13		Cai Qi (蔡奇) (born 1955)	27 May 2017	13 November 2022	
14		Yin Li (尹力) (born 1962)	13 November 2022	Incumbent	
