= Qiyan (disambiguation) =

Qiyan were a social class of women, trained as entertainers, which existed in the pre-modern Islamic world.

Qiyan may also refer to:

- Qiyan metro station, a metro station of the Taipei Metro.
- Li Qiyan (1938–2020), a mayor of Beijing (1993–1996).
- Cheyenne Goh (吴琪雁; Wu Qiyan), a Singaporean short track speed skater (born 1999).

== See also ==
- Qiyan jueju
