= Jia Qinglin =

Chinese politician (born 1940)

- 贾庆林
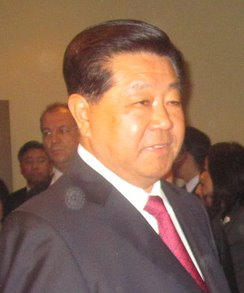
- Jia in 2011

7th Chairman of the National Committee of the Chinese People's Political Consultative Conference
- In office 13 March 2003 – 11 March 2013
- Deputy: Wang Gang
- Preceded by: Li Ruihuan
- Succeeded by: Yu Zhengsheng

Party Secretary of Beijing
- In office 25 August 1997 – 22 October 2002
- Preceded by: Wei Jianxing
- Succeeded by: Liu Qi

Party Secretary of Fujian
- In office 30 December 1993 – 28 October 1996
- Preceded by: Chen Guangyi
- Succeeded by: Chen Mingyi

Personal details
- Born: 13 March 1940 (age 86) Botou, Hebei, China
- Party: Chinese Communist Party
- Spouse: Lin Youfang
- Children: 1 son, 1 daughter
- Relatives: Li Pak-tam (son-in-law); Jasmine Li (grandchild)
- Education: Hebei University of Technology
- Profession: Engineer

Chinese name
- Traditional Chinese: 賈慶林
- Simplified Chinese: 贾庆林
Transcriptions
Standard Mandarin
- Hanyu Pinyin: Jiǎ Qìnglín
Southern Min
- Hokkien POJ: Ka Kheng-lim

Jia Qinglin (Chinese: 贾庆林; born 13 March 1940) is a retired senior leader of the People's Republic of China and of the ruling Chinese Communist Party (CCP). He was a member of the CCP's Politburo Standing Committee, the party's highest ruling organ, between 2002 and 2012, and Chairman of the National Committee of the People's Political Consultative Conference between 2003 and 2013.

Jia, an engineer by trade, began his political career in Fujian in 1985. There, he rose steadily through the ranks and led the province during the Yuanhua scandal. In 1996, Jia was transferred to become mayor, then party chief of Beijing. Largely due to his patronage relationship with then General Secretary Jiang Zemin, Jia was promoted to the Politburo in 1997, and remained a mainstay figure in China's political elite for the next fifteen years. He retired in 2013.

== Political career ==
Jia Qinglin was born on 13 March 1940 in rural Jiaohe County (now Botou), Hebei, to an ordinary family of farmers. Owing to his academic ability, he was admitted to the Shijiazhuang Industrial Management School and majored in industrial enterprise planning. Starting in 1958, he began studying electrical motor and appliance design and manufacturing at the Hebei Institute of Technology (now Hebei University of Technology). After graduating in 1962, he was assigned a technician position at the First Machine-Building Ministry and became involved in the Communist Youth League.

During the Cultural Revolution, Jia joined his educated contemporaries to perform manual labor at the May 7 Cadre School at the First Machine Building Ministry in Fengxin County, Jiangxi Province. In 1971, he began work at the Policy Research Office of the First Machine-Building Industry Ministry. In 1973, he was promoted to chief of the product management bureau of the First Ministry of Machine-building Industry. In 1978, he was named general manager of the China National Machinery and Equipment Import and Export Corporation. In 1983, he became director of Taiyuan Heavy Machinery Plant and its party secretary.

As part of wider national efforts by the Communist Party to make officials across the country more youthful and educated, in 1985, Jia made his foray into regional politics, being admitted to the Fujian provincial party standing committee and serving as deputy party secretary. He later also took on the concurrent role as head of party organization in Fujian. In 1990, he was promoted to acting governor, confirmed in 1991. In 1993, Jia was promoted to Party Secretary of Fujian, the top office in the coastal province. When Jia was the party secretary of Fujian, Xi Jinping, the current General Secretary, was the deputy party secretary of Fujian from 1996.

Sometime during the 1990s, Jia gained the confidence of then-General Secretary Jiang Zemin, with whom he developed a patron-client relationship. Jia was transferred to Beijing in 1996 to serve as mayor, and in 1997 was promoted to the position of party secretary, helping Jiang consolidate the city's political landscape after Chen Xitong was ousted on corruption charges. As Beijing party chief, Jia became a member of the Communist Party's ruling Politburo. He also came onto the national and international spotlight during the 50th Anniversary celebrations of the People's Republic of China as the event's master of ceremonies, reading prepared lines atop the Tiananmen Gate to millions of onlookers and television audiences.

== At the national level ==
Because of his high local position and his ties to Jiang, in November 2002, Jia was named to the 16th Politburo Standing Committee (PSC) of the Chinese Communist Party. Although his ceremonial role as the Chairman of the Chinese People's Political Consultative Conference, a quasi-consultative upper house in China's political system, made him fourth in the official order of precedence, it was widely accepted that the position carried very little power, perhaps the least powerful in the nine PSC members. Jia Qinglin was the most senior Chinese official to attend the funeral of Zhao Ziyang. With the transition of authority to Hu Jintao, Jia appeared to have been given the job of coordinating policy on Taiwan.

In 2007, Jia was named again to the 17th Politburo Standing Committee during the 17th Party Congress. Prior to the congress, it was speculated that Jia may be thrown out of the running due to his tainted record as the party chief of Fujian during the Yuanhua scandal. However, largely owing to the backing of Jiang Zemin, Jia was able to remain on the body for one more term.

Jia exited from the Politburo Standing Committee in 2012 after reaching retirement age. He retired from politics for good in March 2013, when he relinquished his CPPCC post on schedule to Yu Zhengsheng. Jia continued to make public appearances in retirement. On 5 September 2015, Jia appeared at the China Victory Day Parade. On 21 December 2015, Jia visited Liancheng County in Fujian. In June 2016, Jia attended a science and innovation exhibition at the Beijing Exhibition Center. In October 2016, Jia showed up at the World Robot Conference in Beijing. On 17 May 2017, Jia met with Hebei University of Technology alumni at Zhongnanhai.

The financial dealings of Jia's granddaughter Jasmine Li (李紫丹) and son-in-law Li Pak-tam were reported on by media during the Panama Papers scandal; Jasmine had been featured on Chinese tabloids for appearing at a Hotel de Crillon debutante ball in Paris in 2009 wearing a Carolina Herrera designer gown.

== See also ==
- Politics of the People's Republic of China
- Shanghai clique
- 16th Politburo Standing Committee of the Chinese Communist Party

Political offices
Preceded by Li Ruihuan	Chairman of the CPPCC National Committee; 2003–2013	Succeeded by Yu Zhengsheng
Party political offices
Preceded by Chen Guangyi	Party Secretary of Fujian; 1993–1996	Succeeded by Chen Mingyi
Preceded by Wei Jianxing	Party Secretary of Beijing; 1997–2002	Succeeded by Liu Qi
Government offices
Preceded by Wang Zhaoguo	Governor of Fujian; 1990–1994	Succeeded by Chen Mingyi
Preceded by Li Qiyan	Mayor of Beijing; 1996–1999	Succeeded by Liu Qi
Order of precedence
Preceded by Wen Jiabao; Premier	4th Rank of the Chinese Communist Party; 17th Politburo Standing Committee	Succeeded by Li Changchun; Propaganda Chairman
Preceded by Wen Jiabao; Premier	4th Rank of the Chinese Communist Party; 16th Politburo Standing Committee	Succeeded by Zeng Qinghong; Vice President
