= Liu Ji (politician) =

Politician and mayor of Beijing

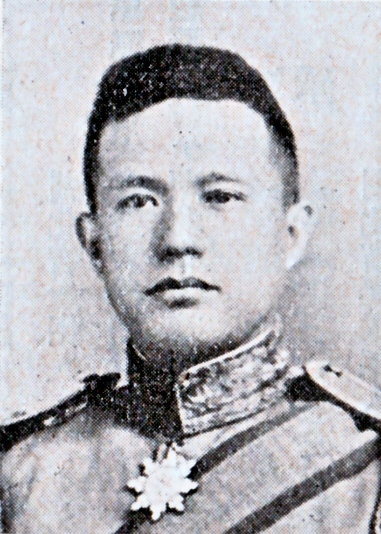

Liu Ji (simplified Chinese: 刘骥; traditional Chinese: 劉驥; pinyin: Liú Jì; 1887–1967) was a Chinese general and politician. Closely associated with Feng Yuxiang, he began his career by joining the Qing Imperial Army, then served under both the Beiyang and Nationalist regimes, and finally ended up joining Mao Zedong and holding political office in the Communist People's Republic of China.

== Life ==
Liu was born in Zhongxiang, Hubei. He joined the Qing Imperial Army in 1905 and then studied at the Northeastern Military Academy in Shenyang, that was founded in 1906 by Viceroy Zhao Erxun. After graduation, he joined the New Army and served under Zhang Shaozeng. Later, he served under Feng Yuxiang, beginning a long association.

After the Xinhai Revolution broke out, he returned to his native Hubei and served as the staff officer of the Hubei Governor's Office. The following year, he enrolled in the Beijing Army University of the Beiyang Government, the highest-level military college at that time in China. After graduation, he served as a major staff officer of the 16th Army Mixed Brigade led by Feng Yuxiang. In 1915, he was named a Senator of the Provisional Senate of the Beiyang Government.

In 1919, he served as the chief of staff of the 11th Army Division, again commanded by Feng Yuxiang. The following year, he served as the chief of staff of the military governor's office in Shaanxi and Henan, supporting Feng Yuxiang. In 1921, he served as the chief of staff of the Northwest Frontier Inspection Office.

In 1924 he participated in the Beijing Coup launched by Feng Yuxiang, and was Mayor of Beijing from 1925 to 1926.

In 1926 he visited the Soviet Union as part of Feng's entourage. In June of that year, he was ordered by Feng to go to Guangzhou and negotiate with the Central Committee of the Kuomintang (KMT) on the formalities of Feng's forces joining the KMT.

In January 1927, after officially joining the National Revolutionary Army, Liu became a member of the Hubei Political Affairs Committee and of the Wuhan Branch of the Central Political Committee of the KMT. In March, he served as commander of the Army Division of the Military Commission of the Wuhan Nationalist Government. In the same month, he served as Feng Yuxiang's plenipotentiary representative of the National Government in Wuhan. In June, he served as chief of staff of the 2nd Army and commander of the 30th Army, participating in the second phase of the Northern Expedition.

In 1928, Liu served as a member of the Military Affairs Commission of the Nationalist Government, but in 1929 he participated in Feng Yuxiang's war against Chiang Kai-shek and was chief of staff of the anti-Chiang coalition army. In September the following year, after Feng's defeat, he served as a Senator of the Military Senate. In 1933, he was appointed administrative inspector of Hubei Province, having little influence, and he resigned a few months later.

When the Second Sino-Japanese War broke out, Liu regained influence and served as Chief of Staff of the Third Theater Command and Chief of Staff of the Sixth Theater. At the end of 1938, he served in Sichuan Province. In 1941 he retired due to eye disease.

After the Communist victory in the Chinese Civil War and the founding of the People's Republic of China in 1949, Liu decided to remain on the mainland and support the new regime of Mao Zedong, and he joined the Revolutionary Committee of the Chinese Kuomintang under Li Jishen. Liu was then appointed as Counsellor of the Counsellors' Office of the Wuhan Municipal People's Government, Chairman of the Wuhan Municipal Committee of the Revolutionary Committee of the Chinese Kuomintang, and, finally, Counsellor of the Counsellors' Office of the Nanjing Municipal People 's Government.

Liu Ji died in Nanjing in 1967, at the age of 80.

Preceded by Xue Dubi	Mayor of Beijing; October 1925 – May 1926	Succeeded by Li Yuan

== Bibliography ==
- 「Liu驥」 Wuhan方志網（武漢市地方志編纂委員会弁公室ホームページ）
- Xu Youchun (徐友春) (main ed.) (2007). Unabridged Biographical Dictionary of the Republic, Revised and Enlarged Version (民国人物大辞典 增订版). Hebei People's Press (Hebei Renmin Chubanshe; 河北人民出版社). ISBN 978-7-202-03014-1.
- Liu寿林ほか編 (1995). 民国職官年表. Zhonghua Book Company. ISBN 7-101-01320-1.
