= Wang Baosen =

Chinese politician

Wang Baosen (Chinese: 王宝森; February 1935 – April 4, 1995) was a Chinese politician who served as Vice Mayor of Beijing. A close associate of the Beijing mayor and Politburo member Chen Xitong, Wang committed suicide in April 1995 when he came under investigation for embezzlement of public funds. His suicide led to the resignation and the eventual conviction of Chen on corruption charges.

== Life and career ==
Wang was born in Fangshan, Hebei Province (now in Beijing). He joined the Chinese Communist Party in January 1955. He was a longtime close associate of Chen Xitong, who was mayor and Party Committee Secretary of Beijing and a member of the Politburo of the Chinese Communist Party. Wang served as deputy mayor and chief of the Beijing Municipal Bureau of Finance under Chen.

Wang and Chen used US$4 million of public funds to build luxury villas for use by themselves and their mistresses. In mid-1994, their embezzlement scheme was exposed during an investigation into an illegal fund-raising scheme with the Wuxi Xinxing Company based in Jiangsu Province. The company had promised investors very high returns (5–10% per month), and bribed officials in 12 provinces to invest public funds into the company. When the company collapsed and could not repay the investors' capital, the authorities launched an investigation, which discovered that Wang had invested US$12 million worth of public funds belonging to the Beijing municipal government into Wuxi Xinxing.

== Death ==
On 4 April 1995, before a scheduled interview with investigators from the Central Commission for Discipline Inspection, Wang killed himself with a gunshot in suburban Huairou County. Wang was posthumously expelled from the Chinese Communist Party on 4 July 1995. His body was cremated in April 1998.

== Aftermath ==
Wang's suicide forced Chen Xitong to take bureaucratic responsibility for Wang's embezzlement. 22 days after Wang's death, Chen apologized and resigned from all his government posts. Further investigations exposed the corruption of Chen and his son Chen Xiaotong, who were found to have taken bribes from a real estate developer in exchange for the permit to build apartments at a prime location in downtown Beijing. Chen Xitong was expelled from the Politburo in 1995 and was later sentenced to 16 years in prison in 1998. The downfall of Wang Baosen and Chen Xitong was seen as a victory of the "Shanghai clique" led by Communist Party general secretary Jiang Zemin over Chen's "Beijing clique".

In January 1997, writer Chen Fang (1945–2005) published the blockbuster novel Heaven's Wrath based on the Wang Baosen–Chen Xitong case. The Chinese authorities banned the book after three months, for "leaking state secrets", which caused sales of pirated versions of the book to skyrocket, reportedly reaching five million copies.
