= Wei Jianxing =

Senior leader in the Chinese Communist Party (1931–2015)

- 尉健行
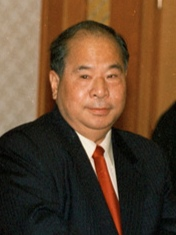
- Wei in 1996

Secretary of the Central Commission for Discipline Inspection
- In office October 19, 1992 – November 15, 2002
- General Secretary: Jiang Zemin
- Preceded by: Qiao Shi
- Succeeded by: Wu Guanzheng

Party Secretary of Beijing
- In office April 27, 1996 – August 25, 1997
- Preceded by: Chen Xitong
- Succeeded by: Jia Qinglin

Chairman of the All-China Federation of Trade Unions
- In office October 24, 1993 – December 28, 2002
- Preceded by: Ni Zhifu
- Succeeded by: Wang Zhaoguo

Minister of Supervision
- In office June 23, 1987 – March 29, 1993
- Premier: Zhao Ziyang; Li Peng
- Preceded by: Qian Ying
- Succeeded by: Cao Qingze

Head of the Organization Department of the Chinese Communist Party
- In office July 13, 1985 – May 27, 1987
- General Secretary: Hu Yaobang
- Preceded by: Qiao Shi
- Succeeded by: Song Ping

Mayor of Harbin
- In office March 10, 1981 – January 20, 1984
- Preceded by: Wang Huacheng
- Succeeded by: Wang Rensheng

Personal details
- Born: January 2, 1931 Sinchang, Chekiang, Republic of China
- Died: August 7, 2015 (aged 84) Beijing, China
- Party: Chinese Communist Party (1949–2002)
- Education: Dalian University of Technology

Wei Jianxing (Chinese: 尉健行; pinyin: Wèi Jiànxíng; January 2, 1931 – August 7, 2015) was a senior leader in the Chinese Communist Party (CCP), most active during the 1980s and 1990s. He successively held a number of important offices, including member of the Politburo Standing Committee, the Secretary of the Central Commission for Discipline Inspection, the Party Secretary of Beijing and the chairman of All-China Federation of Trade Unions.

== Biography ==
Wei Jianxing was born in Xinchang County, Zhejiang Province. He moved to Shanghai and entered Guanghua University High School in 1947, where he became close to fellow Zhejiang native and Guanghua alumnus Qiao Shi, who was a leader of the student movement of the underground CCP. Wei joined the CCP in March 1949.

Wei later enrolled in Dalian University of Technology and graduated in 1952, majoring in mechanics. From 1952 to 1953, he studied Russian language in Fushun. Wei was then sent to the Soviet Union to study industrial management until 1955. In the early stages of the Cultural Revolution he was politically disgraced and performed manual labour, but regained favour in 1970 and became the head of the revolutionary committee of the factory he worked at. Between 1981 and 1983 he served as Mayor of Harbin.

Wei was then transferred to work at the All-China Federation of Trade Unions where he served on the organization's Secretariat. He then rose to become head of the Organization Department of the Chinese Communist Party. His work gained recognition from then party General Secretary Hu Yaobang. In 1987 Hu was oustered in a power struggle by conservative forces within the party and Wei, being branded a Hu loyalist, was transferred out of the organs of power to serve in a relatively unimportant position of Minister of Supervision. While serving at the ministry Wei played an important role in developing China's civil servant supervision programs as well as rules and regulations on the discipline of government officials.

In October 1992, at the 14th Party Congress, Wei was named to the Politburo, in addition to becoming a Secretary of Central Secretariat, and the Secretary of Central Commission for Discipline Inspection (CCDI). During Wei's term as CCDI chief, some 680,000 disciplinary cases were processed. The most prominent case was that against Beijing party chief Chen Xitong, who was investigated for corruption beginning in July 1994 and expelled from the party a month later. In the wake of Chen's disgrace Wei himself took over at Beijing party chief and stayed in the position for two years. In 1993, he also became Chairman of the All-China Federation of Trade Unions and served for two terms. At the 15th Party Congress held in 1997, Wei earned a seat on the elite seven-man Politburo Standing Committee and continued to serve as CCDI Secretary.

Wei retired in 2002 and left public life. He has attended some official functions sporadically since then. He died in Beijing on 7 August 2015.

Government offices
Preceded by Ni Zhifu	Chairman of the All-China Federation of Trade Unions; 1993–2002	Succeeded by Wang Zhaoguo
Preceded by Qian Ying	Minister of Supervision; 1987–1993	Succeeded by Cao Qingze
Party political offices
Preceded by Qiao Shi	Head of the Organization Department of the Chinese Communist Party; 1985–1987	Succeeded by Song Ping
Preceded by Qiao Shi	Secretary of the Central Commission for Discipline Inspection; 1992–2002	Succeeded by Wu Guanzheng
Preceded by Chen Xitong	Party Secretary of Beijing; 1995–1997	Succeeded by Jia Qinglin
