= Xue Dubi =

Chinese politician

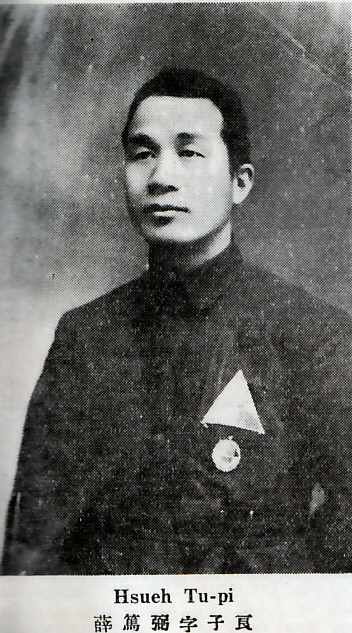

Xue Dubi (simplified Chinese: 薛笃弼; traditional Chinese: 薛篤弼; pinyin: Xuēdǔbì; 1892-July 9, 1973) was a politician of the Republic of China and the People's Republic of China. He was born in Yuncheng, Shanxi. In 1911, at the age of 19, he joined the Tongmenghui. He was the 10th Republic-era mayor of Beijing as part of the Beiyang government. He later went over to the Kuomintang and served in the various positions in the Nationalist government in both Nanjing and Chongqing. After the creation of the People's Republic, Xue chose to remain in the mainland. He died in Shanghai at the age of 82.

== Views ==
As Minister of the Interior, Xue praised Christianity. According to Xue, Buddhist institutions were shelters for ascetics, parasites, and criminals.

In 1928, as Minister of the Interior, Xue issued an order seeking to prohibit the redemptive societies the Daoyuan and the Wushanshe. Xue's order described spirit writing, which both organizations practiced, as anti-scientific and subversive. According to Xue, the societies spread superstition, "obfuscating the knowledge of the people and preventing progress." Xue also opined that if superstitious customs were not reformed, "it truly will incite other countries to laugh."

Preceded by Wang Zhixiang	Mayor of Beijing; December 31, 1924-October 1925	Succeeded by Liu Ji
Preceded by new office	Minister of the Interior (Nationalist Government); August 1927-October 1928	Succeeded by Yan Xishan
Preceded by new office	Minister of Health (Nationalist Government); October 1928-November 1929	
Preceded by new office	Chairman of the water resources Commission of the Executive Yuan; September 1941-June 1946	Succeeded by himself as Administration of water conservancy Committee
Preceded by himself as Chairman of the water resources Commission of the Executive Yuan	Administration of water conservancy Committee; June 1946-April 1947	Succeeded by himself as Minister of Water works
Preceded by himself as Administration of water conservancy Committee	Minister of Water works June 1946-April 1947	

== Bibliography ==
- Xu Youchun (徐友春) (main ed.) (2007). Unabridged Biographical Dictionary of the Republic, Revised and Enlarged Version (民国人物大辞典 增订版). Hebei People's Press (Hebei Renmin Chubanshe; 河北人民出版社). ISBN 978-7-202-03014-1.
- 劉寿林ほか編 (1995). 民国職官年表|和書. 中華書局. ISBN 7-101-01320-1.
