= Li Pak-tam =

Chinese businessman and socialite

- Other name: Li Botan
- Occupation: Businessman
- Known for: Venture Capitalism
- Spouse: Jia Qiang
- Children: 2, including Jasmine Li

Li Pak-tam, also known as Li Botan, is a Chinese businessman and socialite. He was one of the three primary backers of the American electric car startup Canoo which was spun off from Faraday Future.

== Family and personal life ==
He is married to Jia Qiang. This makes him the son-in-law of Jia Qinglin a top Chinese Communist Party official who was the fourth most powerful man in China before his retirement in 2013. Li has two daughters, a daughter named Zidan (Jasmine) Li, and another graduated from Harvard College in 2023. Both Li Pak-tam and Jasmine Li hold Hong Kong residence cards.

== Career ==
Li Pak-tam is the founder and former chairman of the board of Beijing Zhaode Investment Co and has also started a number of companies in Hong Kong.

In 2016 Li was implicated in the Panama Papers leak. The documents revealed that he was the owner of a firm named Fung Shing Development Ltd., which had been set up in the British Virgin Islands, a tax haven. His daughter Jasmine was also named in the Panama Papers, her shell company Harvest Sun Trading Ltd. shared a director, Polly Pau Tsz-yim, with her father's BVI shell company. In 2015 The New York Times reported that Li was using an employee named Pan Yongbin as a proxy to hold 32 million shares of Wanda Group, then valued at $200 million.

In October 2019, Li's stake in Canoo was revealed by a lawsuit filed by Christina Krause, the wife of co-founder Stefan Krause. Along with Li, Krause and German industrialist David Stern were Canoo's primary backers. The company started in 2017 when Krause pitched Li and Stern on the idea in Hong Kong. After the meeting, the three reportedly entered into a gentleman's agreement to start the company. Li and Stern provided the startup capital.
