= Chen Xitong =

Chinese politician (1930–2013)

- 陈希同

Party Secretary of Beijing
- In office October 1992 – September 1995
- Preceded by: Li Ximing
- Succeeded by: Li Qiyan

Mayor of Beijing
- In office April 1983 – January 1993
- Preceded by: Jiao Ruoyu
- Succeeded by: Wei Jianxing

Personal details
- Born: June 10, 1930 Anyue, Sichuan, China
- Died: June 2, 2013 (aged 82) Beijing, China
- Party: Chinese Communist Party (1949–1995)
- Education: Peking University

Chen Xitong (Chinese: 陈希同; pinyin: Chén Xītóng; June 10, 1930 – June 2, 2013) was a member of the Politburo of the Chinese Communist Party and the Mayor of Beijing until he was removed from office on charges of corruption in 1995.

== Early life ==
Chen was born on June 10, 1930, in Anyue, Sichuan Province. He attended Peking University at the age of 18 and majored in Chinese Language. He joined the Chinese Communist Party in 1949.

== Political career ==
By November 1979 when he had been elected as the vice-mayor of Beijing Municipality, he had served as the leader of a neighborhood committee, deputy head of a police substation, head of a factory workshop, secretary to Liu Ren (Beijing Municipality Communist Party 2nd Secretary), deputy head of a rural commune and Party Secretary of Changping County of Beijing. He was demoted during the Cultural Revolution and forced to clean toilets for some time. His early support for Deng Xiaoping led to his return to the Beijing Party office in 1979. By 1982, he was the Secretary of Beijing Municipality Communist Party and was elected as a member of the 12th Central Committee of the Chinese Communist Party by the 12th Party Congress. In April 1983, Chen Xitong became Mayor of Beijing Municipality and was appointed as a State Councilor in April 1988. He also served as the head of international goodwill delegations to a variety of places including North Korea, U.S.A, Moscow, France, Ankara, Warsaw, East Berlin.

=== 1989 Tiananmen Square protests and massacre ===
Chen Xitong was the mayor of Beijing during the 1989 Tiananmen Square protests and massacre. He played a central role in the events that unfolded during and after the protests.

After the death of Hu Yaobang, the Chinese Communist Party's (CCP) former General Secretary, university students in Beijing, who saw Hu as a reformer, seized the opportunity of his mourning to protest a variety of issues they felt plagued the country.

On April 22, during Hu's state funeral, students knelt down in front of the Great Hall of the People demanding an audience with Li Peng, the Premier of the State Council, but were ignored. Chen Xitong blamed lower party officials for leading the students to believe they could have an audience with Li Peng. Chen Xitong, on April 23, called a meeting with presidents of various Beijing universities, chastised them for their passivity and asked them to gather more information on the protests. On the same day, Li Ximing, Beijing Party Secretary, and Chen Xitong convinced Wan Li, Chairman of the Standing Committee, to call a meeting of the Politburo Standing Committee (PSC) to address the issue of the student protest. On April 24, Li Peng presided over a PSC meeting at which Chen Xitong and Li Ximing made official reports on behalf of the Beijing Municipal Party Committee. They presented the student protest as planned and well organized. In their reports, they stressed that protests were happening simultaneously nationwide and stated that the committee should not take the protest lightly. They argued that the protests included "... high school students and workers ..." and were growing at an alarming rate. They also highlighted remarks targeted at Deng Xiaoping, the paramount leader of the People's Republic. Based on this report, Li Peng updated Deng Xiaoping on the protests and Deng responded that "this was no ordinary student movement." By April 25 phone lines at Peking University dorms were cut and telegrams blocked. On April 26, the People’s Daily published an editorial, based largely on Deng Xiaoping's reaction to Li Peng's report that painted the protest as turmoil. This echoed rhetoric of the Cultural Revolution and exacerbated the protests. On April 27 students repeatedly broke police lines meant to deter them from going to the square. On April 30 Chen Xitong and Li Ximing met with the Beijing College Student Association, an officially approved organization that was not affiliated with the protesting students.

In another PSC meeting on May 1, after the government failed to clear the square in reaction to the April 26th editorial, Chen Xitong, on behalf of the Beijing Party Committee, accused the Standing Committee of betrayal. The Beijing Municipal Government had announced stricter limits on protests, which were enthusiastically ignored by protesters. This led Zhao Ziyang, the General Secretary of the CCP, to describe these limits in his narrative of the events, “as a piece of wastepaper.” On May 8, Chen Xitong accused Zhao Ziyang of betraying the Standing Committee in the conciliatory speech Zhao gave about the student protest at the Asian Development Bank meeting on May 4.

On May 13, anticipating the arrival of Gorbachev for the 1989 Sino-Soviet Summit, students began a hunger strike. Zhao Ziyang appointed Chen Xitong and Li Ximing as part of a delegation to meet with the students at Tiananmen. Students accused Chen of living too extravagant a lifestyle, to which he responded, “We have made some mistakes.” Chen Xitong and Li Ximing even offered to disclose their assets as a way to calm protesters and absolve themselves of corruption charges. However, they were not able to reach any meaningful agreement with students concerning any of the matters raised. On May 18 students met with Li Peng to discuss conditions for vacating the square. In this meeting, Chen Xitong noted the hassle the protest had caused the city of Beijing and its effect on the city's traffic and productivity. According to the May 18th entry of Li Peng's unpublished diary, The Critical Moment, in a Committee meeting to decide the next course of action, Chen Xitong was put in charge of carrying out a martial law order with assistance from a military general. On May 20, martial law was effected with an order banning protests and strikes signed by Chen Xitong. This again exacerbated the crisis as more people showed up to support the students in reaction to the announcement and prevented soldiers from carrying out the order to clear the square.

On June 1, Xinhua News Agency quoted Chen Xitong at a Children's Day celebration attended by 20,000 children, telling the children not to worry about the protest, elaborating that they would gain access to Tiananmen Square very soon. Chen Xitong and Li Ximing then went to Deng Xiaoping's home on June 2 and gave him a report that portrayed the protest as part of an international plot to derail the progress of China. On the night of June 3, the People's Liberation Army would finally carry out the order to clear the square, which resulted in deadly casualties.

By June 5, Chen Xitong was one of the first CCP officials to give an official statement concerning the events. Chen Xitong did not appear on television to give this statement. James Miles, BBC's Beijing correspondent at the time, believes his physical absence to back up the statement was a sign of the Party's political uncertainty following the crackdown. On June 30 at the 7th National People's Congress’ (NPC) 8th session, Chen Xitong delivered the CCP’s official narrative of the events titled Checking the Turmoil and Quelling the Counter-revolutionary Rebellion. In this report, Chen accused the liberal leaning Economics Weekly (Jingjixue Zhoubao), owned by Chen Ziming's Beijing Social and Economic Science Research Institute, of attempting to protect Zhao Ziyang and overthrow Deng Xiaoping. He also accused the paper of pushing a bourgeois liberalization agenda. Economics Weekly was closed down after the crackdown. However, the speech focused on the role Zhao Ziyang played in the crisis than that played by the official “black hands” of the crisis, Chen Ziming and Wang Juntao. It also focused on foreign influences. Chen Xitong accused anti-socialist actors from Hong Kong of facilitating the student protest by providing weapons and money. He also denounced Liu Xiaobo's connection with dissidents in New York. Chen Xitong maintained that protesters were influenced by foreign actors and did not invite foreign news agencies to his press conferences until March 7, 1990.

Scholar of East Asian studies, Ezra Vogel, presents the argument that Chen Xitong exaggerated the dangers posed by the initial protests in his April 24 report to the PSC. This exaggeration is believed to have launched the domino effect that led to the eventual crackdown of the protest. Some reasons given for this possible exaggeration include – the idea that Chen, fearing repercussions of allowing a protest to continue in his jurisdiction, exaggerated the dangers posed by the protesters to convince the PSC to quell it immediately. Ogden et al. also posit that the second-generation of hardliners, to which Chen belonged, maintained their tough stance, in unison with party elders, to get promoted within the party. This they felt they could achieve if Zhao and his appointees were pushed out. Chen Xitong was regularly accused by protesters of corruption and some demanded that he be impeached, accusing him of controlling the media like a “shameless warlord.” Chen Xitong was allied with many of the more famous targets of the protesters, like Li Peng.

=== After Tiananmen Square protests ===
Political Scientist Joseph Fewsmith argues Chen Xitong was in the running to replace Zhao Ziyang, but Deng Xiaoping felt his public hardline stance in the Tiananmen protests made him a difficult choice to succeed Zhao. This compared to Jiang Zemin who was able to incentivize workers in Shanghai to remove roadblocks and students, a feat that gained the respect of party elders. Chen Xitong's loyalty to Deng Xiaoping's reform and opening up would however be rewarded with promotions within the party. He was selected as the Beijing Party Secretary in 1991 after Li Ximing fell out of favour because of his opposition to Deng's economic reforms. Chen also earned a seat within Politburo in 1992.

Conversations with Chen Xitong

In 2012, a book titled Conversations with Chen Xitong based on interviews with Chen, authored by Yao Jianfu, a retired journalist of the Xinhua News Agency, with a foreword by Wu Guoguang was published by New Century Press. In this book Chen sought to challenge the idea that he played an important part in the crackdown. As for the idea that he convinced Deng Xiaoping to adopt hard line tactics, Chen argues that he had never been to Deng Xiaoping's house. He argues further that Li Ximing actually misinformed him about the student protests. Regarding the report he read on behalf of the Communist Party, he contends that he was never part of the drafting process of the report. This is confirmed by Li Peng's unpublished diary, which stated in its June 18 entry that he and Jiang Zemin in a PSC meeting chose Chen Xitong to read the report even though he was not at the draft meeting. On his administration of the martial law order, Chen was puzzled by the idea that he was in charge of the crackdown of June 3–4 and claims he had no knowledge of this until Li Peng's diary surfaced in 2010. Wu Guoguang's foreword states that due to the chaotic nature of those few days, it is plausible that Chen was not informed about his role in the crackdown in advance. He would go on to say he was "sorry" for the event of June 4, 1989, saying that no one should have died in the crackdown. He rejected reports that thousands of people died in Tiananmen Square as "nonsense", while also pointing to violence that occurred against People's Liberation Army forces. There are also reports that Chen Xitong stated that he is a staunch communist, and opposing unrest was his basic attitude during that day and he has not changed this view.

== Corruption scandal ==
As the leader of "Beijing clique", Chen challenged Jiang Zemin's newly obtained authority during his presidency. This led to Chen's downfall in 1995 during an anti-corruption campaign led by Jiang's Shanghai clique. Some observers view Chen's downfall as a political struggle between Chen and Jiang. According to the book Conversations with Chen Xitong, he denied the corruption charges brought against him, calling them "the worst miscarriage of justice involving a high-level leader since the Cultural Revolution, or since 1989... an absurd miscarriage of justice."

Chen's Vice Mayor, Wang Baosen, died by suicide in 1994, which led to a confrontational power struggle between the "Beijing clique" and the "Shanghai clique". It was later stated that the money that Chen embezzled was used to build vacational recreation centers, which catered to most top-tier politicians in Beijing at the time. Chen was also accused of having an extramarital affair with He Ping. In 1998, Chen Xitong was given a 16-year jail sentence on charges of corruption and dereliction of duty. His son, Chen Xiaotong, was also sentenced for 12 years. Chen left Qincheng Prison in 2004 under probation, officially due to reasons of ill health.

The novel The Wrath of Heaven — the Anti-Corruption Bureau in Action (天怒—反貪局在行動; pinyin: Tiān nù—Fǎntānjú zài Xíngdòng), published in 1996, is a fictionalized account of the Chen Xitong case written from the point of a view of an investigator. A small-scale, disorganized ban occurred shortly after publication, but the ban seems to have been overturned sometime later, with the book being available for sale on Chinese book websites.

== Death ==
Chen died of cancer on June 2, 2013, two days before the 24th anniversary of the Tiananmen Crackdown, and less than two months before his release date. He was 82.

Political offices
Preceded by Jiao Ruoyu	Mayor of Beijing; 1983–1993	Succeeded by Li Qiyan
Preceded by Li Ximing	Party Secretary of Beijing; 1992–1995	Succeeded by Wei Jianxing
