= Liu Qi (politician, born 1942) =

Chinese politician

Liu Qi Olympic Order
- 刘淇
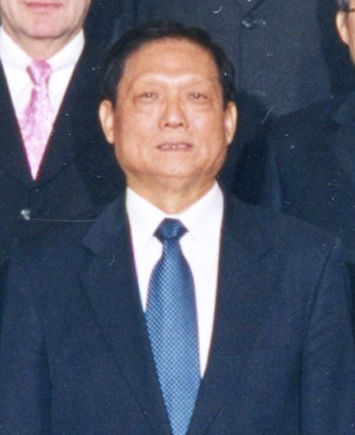
- Liu Qi

Party Secretary of Beijing
- In office 22 October 2002 – 3 July 2012
- Preceded by: Jia Qinglin
- Succeeded by: Guo Jinlong

President of the Beijing Organizing Committee for the Olympic Games
- In office 29 August 2004 – 24 August 2008
- IOC President: Jacques Rogge
- Preceded by: Gianna Angelopoulos-Daskalaki
- Succeeded by: Sebastian Coe

Chair of the Beijing Organizing Committee for the Olympic Games
- In office December 13, 2001 – August 22, 2009
- Preceded by: Committee established
- Succeeded by: Position dissolved

Mayor of Beijing
- In office 10 February 1999 – 19 January 2003
- Preceded by: Jia Qinglin
- Succeeded by: Meng Xuenong

Minister of Metallurgical Industry
- In office March 1993 – March 1998
- Preceded by: Qi Yuanqing
- Succeeded by: Position revoked

Personal details
- Born: 3 November 1942 (age 83) Wujin, Changzhou, Jiangsu, China
- Party: Chinese Communist Party
- Education: Beijing 101 Middle School; University of Science and Technology Beijing

Liu Qi (simplified Chinese: 刘淇; traditional Chinese: 劉淇; pinyin: Liú Qí; born November 3, 1942, in Wujin, Changzhou, Jiangsu) is a retired Chinese politician. He formerly served as the Party Secretary of Beijing, and also a member of the Politburo of the Chinese Communist Party. He was also the president of the Beijing 2008 Olympics Organizing Committee.

== Biography ==
=== Steel Industry ===
Liu Qi graduated from Beijing 101 Middle School in 1959 and subsequently enrolled in the Beijing Institute of Iron and Steel Engineering, and majored in iron smelting, graduating in 1964. Concurrently, he was accepted into the postgraduate program of the same department, specializing in Ferrous metallurgy, and obtained his postgraduate qualification in 1968. In June of the same year, he was appointed to the Wuhan Iron and Steel Company's Iron and Steel Plant, where he held positions as gas worker, furnace foreman, and foreman of the second blast furnace. He joined the Chinese Communist Party (CCP) in September 1975. From 1978 to 1983, he served as a technician and deputy furnace manager of the third blast furnace at the same plant. From 1983 to 1985, he was the deputy director of the plant and the director of the production department. From 1985 to 1990, he served as the first director of the Wuhan Iron and Steel Company's Iron and Steel Plant. From 1985 until 1990, he served as the inaugural deputy manager of Wuhan Iron and Steel Company and was a member of the company's CCP committee. From 1990 to 1993, he served as the manager of Wuhan Iron and Steel Company.

He held the position of Minister of the Ministry of Metallurgical Industry from 1993 until 1998.

=== Beijing ===
In 1998, Zhu Rongji, the newly appointed premier of the state council, oversaw the institutional reform of the State Council, resulting in the dissolution of the Ministry of Metallurgical Industry. Liu Qi was subsequently appointed as the deputy secretary of the Beijing Municipal Committee of the Chinese Communist Party and Deputy Mayor of Beijing. From 1999 to 2002, he held the position of deputy secretary of the Beijing Municipal Committee of the CCP and served as the mayor of Beijing. From 2002 to 2003, he held the positions of member of the Political Bureau of the CCP Central Committee, secretary of the Beijing Municipal Committee of the CCP, and mayor. He was a member of the Political Bureau of the CCP Central Committee and Secretary of the Beijing Municipal Committee of the CCP from 2003 till June 2012. In December 2001, he held the position of chairman of the Beijing Organizing Committee for the Olympic Games. During his tenure, Beijing effectively hosted the 2008 Summer Olympic Games, and on August 25, 2008, Liu Qi received the Olympic Order from International Olympic Committee (IOC) President Jacques Rogge.

Liu Qi chaired 60th anniversary of the People's Republic of China in 2009 as the master of ceremonies, and has served as the deputy head of the Central Guidance Commission on Building Spiritual Civilization since July 2012. In November 2012, he resigned from his position as a member of the Politburo of the Chinese Communist Party.

Political offices
Preceded by Jia Qinglin	Mayor of Beijing; 1999–2003	Succeeded by Meng Xuenong
Preceded by Qi Yuanqing	Minister of Metallurgical Industry of PRC; 1993–1998	Succeeded by Agency Defunct
Party political offices
Preceded by Jia Qinglin	Party Secretary of Beijing; 2002–2012	Succeeded by Guo Jinlong
Sporting positions
Preceded by (Greece) Gianna Angelopoulos-Daskalaki	President of Organizing Committee for Olympic Games; 2008	Succeeded by (United Kingdom) Sebastian Coe
