= Su Tiren =

Chinese politician (1888–1979)

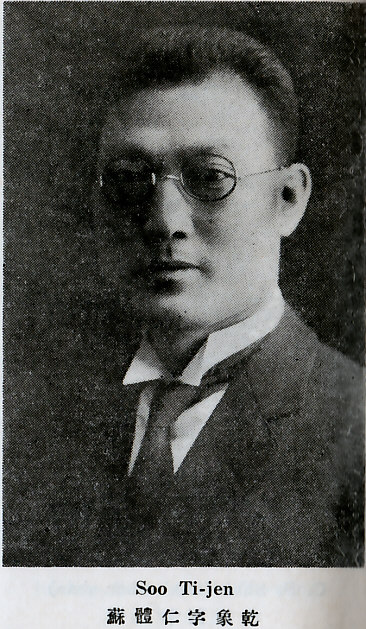
- Su Tiren

Governor of Shanxi
- In office 1938–1943
- Preceded by: New office
- Succeeded by: Feng Sizhi

Mayor of Beijing
- In office January 1943 – February 1943
- Preceded by: Yu Jinhe
- Succeeded by: Liu Yushu

Personal details
- Born: 1888 Shuozhou, Shanxi, Qing China
- Died: 20 August 1979 (aged 90–91) Taiwan
- Education: Tokyo Institute of Technology

Su Tiren (traditional Chinese: 蘇體仁; simplified Chinese: 苏体仁; Wade–Giles: Su Ti-jen) (1888 - 20 August 1979) was a Republic of China politician who served with the Wang Jingwei regime during the Second Sino-Japanese War.

== Biography ==
Su was born in Shuozhou, Shanxi. He studied chemistry at the Tokyo Institute of Technology, graduating in 1916. He served in Yan Xishan's administration, taking up a position under the Nationalist government in Hebei in 1928. During the Second Sino-Japanese War, he governed his home province initially on behalf of the Provisional government of Wang Kemin and after 1940, for the Wang Jingwei regime in Nanjing. In 1943, he was briefly mayor of Beijing. After the defeat of the Japanese in World War II, he went to Taiyuan where he served under Yan Xishan once again. With the fall of Beijing and Taiyuan to the communists in the Chinese Civil War, he fled to Lanzhou, Gansu before making his way to Hong Kong. He died in Taiwan on 20 August 1979.

== Bibliography ==
- Xu, Youchun (2007). 民国人物大辞典 増訂版. Hebei People's Publishing House. ISBN 978-7-202-03014-1.
- 山西通志 人物志. Zhonghua Book Company. 2001. ISBN 9787101007008.
- Liu Shoulin; et al. (1995). 民国職官年表. Zhonghua Book Company. ISBN 7-101-01320-1.
- 最新支那要人伝. Asahi Shimbun Company. 1941.
