= Liu Menggeng =

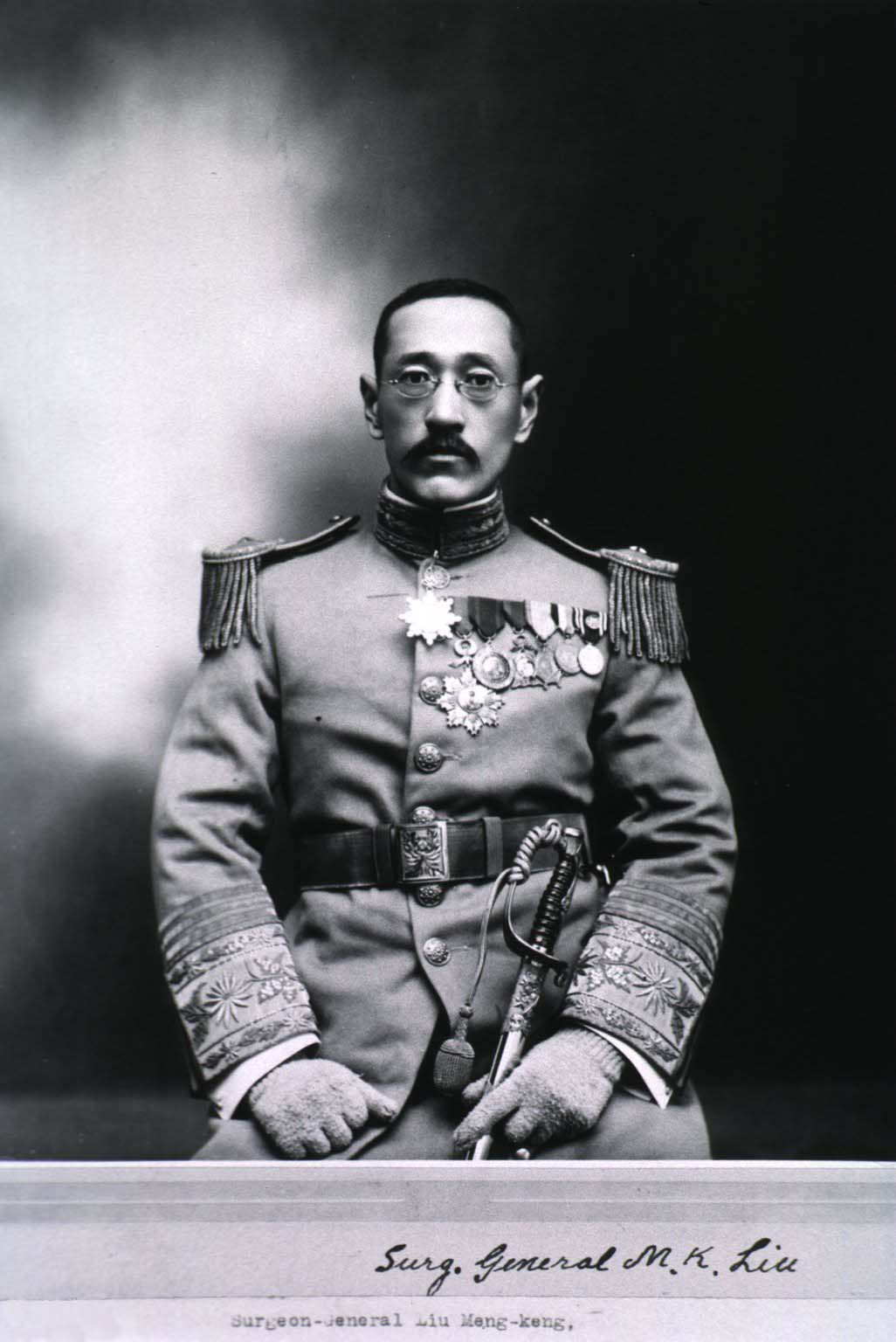
- Born: 1881; Qinhuangdao, Hebei
- Died: after 1937; Manchukuo
- Occupations: Politician; Physician
- Known for: Mysterious disappearance

Liu Menggeng (simplified Chinese: 刘梦庚; traditional Chinese: 劉夢庚; pinyin: Liú Mènggēng; 1881 – after 1937) was a politician and physician of the Republic of China and Manchukuo. He was born in Qinhuangdao, Hebei.

== Background and disappearance ==
Menggeng was the 8th Republican mayor of Beijing. He was affiliated with the Zhili clique, which was part of the Beiyang government. After the creation of Manchukuo, he accepted a Japanese offer to be the collaborationist governor of Rehe Province. His whereabouts after leaving office are unknown.

Preceded by Sun Zhenjia	Mayor of Beijing; 1922–1924	Succeeded by Wang Zhixiang
Preceded by Zhang Haipeng	Manchukuo governor of Rehe; November 1934 – July 1937	Succeeded by Jin Mingshi

== See also ==
- List of people who disappeared

== Bibliography ==
- 徐友春主編 (2007). 民国人物大辞典 増訂版|和書. 河北人民出版社. ISBN 978-7-202-03014-1.
- 劉寿林ほか編 (1995). 民国職官年表|和書. Zhonghua Book Company. ISBN 7-101-01320-1.
- 新発現並基本確認的河北区名人旧居居（三） 天津市河北区政務網（天津市河北区人民政府ホームページ）
