= Yu Jinhe =

Chinese politician

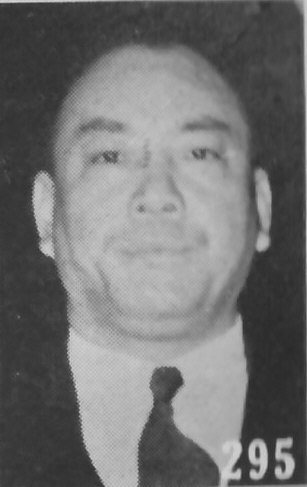
Yu Jinhe as pictured in The Most Recent Biographies of Chinese Dignitaries

Yu Jinhe (Chinese: 余晋龢; 1887 – after 1945) was a politician of the Republic of China. He was born in Shaoxing, Zhejiang. He graduated from the Imperial Japanese Army Academy. He was the 2nd collaborationist mayor of Beijing. He served on the North China Political Council from February-November 1943. After the downfall of Wang Jingwei's government in August 1945, Yu was arrested and later died in prison at an unknown date.

Preceded by Jiang Chaozong	Mayor of Beijing; 1938–1943	Succeeded by Su Tiren

== Alma mater ==
Imperial Japanese Army Academy

== Bibliography ==
- 徐友春主編 (2007). 民国人物大辞典 増訂版. Hebei人民出版社. ISBN 9787202030141.
- 王娟「自由学園北京生活学校の設立について」 『鶴山論叢』第10号、2010年3月31日 Kobe University
- 余子道ほか (2006). 汪偽政権全史 下巻. Shanghai People's Publishing House. ISBN 7-208-06486-5.
- 劉寿林ほか編 (1995). 民国職官年表. Zhonghua Book Company. ISBN 7-101-01320-1.
- 最新支那要人伝. Asahi Shimbun Company. 1941.
