= He Chengjun =

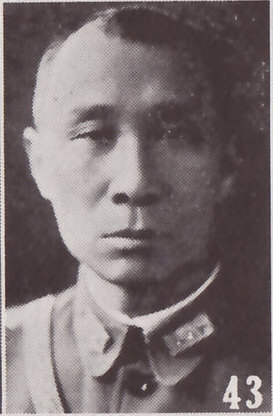
He Chengjun (何成浚) as pictured in The Most Recent Biographies of Chinese Dignitaries

He Chengjun (Chinese: 何成濬) (June 20, 1882 – May 7, 1961) was a Kuomintang politician and military officer of the Republic of China. He was born in Hubei. He was a graduate of the Imperial Japanese Army Academy. As a member of the Tongmenghui, he took part in the Xinhai Revolution. He was briefly mayor of Beijing after its capture by the National Revolutionary Army during the Northern Expedition. In the Second Sino-Japanese War, he was the governor of his home province and defended it against the advancing Imperial Japanese Army. After the defeat of the Kuomintang in the Chinese Civil War, he went to Hong Kong and, in 1951, arrived in Taiwan. He died in Taipei at the age of 78.

Preceded by Li Shengpei	Mayor of Beijing; June 25 – July 13, 1928	Succeeded by He Qigong
Preceded by Zhang Zhiben	governor of Hubei; 1929–1932	Succeeded by Xia Douyin
Preceded by Huang Shaohong	governor of Hubei; October 1937 – June 1938	Succeeded by Chen Cheng

== Awards and decorations ==
Order of the Sacred Tripod
Order of the Cloud and Banner

== Bibliography ==
- Xu Youchun (徐友春) (main ed.) (2007). Unabridged Biographical Dictionary of the Republic, Revised and Enlarged Version (民国人物大辞典 增订版). Hebei People's Press (Hebei Renmin Chubanshe; 河北人民出版社). ISBN 978-7-202-03014-1.
- Liu国銘主編 (2005). 中国国民党百年人物全書. 団結出版社. ISBN 7-80214-039-0.
- Liu寿林ほか編 (1995). 民国職官年表. 中華書局. ISBN 7-101-01320-1.
- 東亜問題調査会編 (1941). 最新支那要人伝. 朝日新聞社.
