= Wang Zhixin =

Chinese politician

Wang Zhixin (Chinese: 王治馨; (August 17, 1868 – October 23, 1914) was a Chinese politician of the Republic of China era. He was born in Yantai, Shandong. He was an associate of Zhao Bingjun during the later years of the Qing Dynasty. A member of the Beiyang government, he served as the 3rd mayor of Beijing (October 16, 1913 – March 23, 1914). On June 27, 1914, on the orders of Yuan Shikai, Wang was arrested and imprisoned for his involvement in the assassination of Song Jiaoren. Wang's downfall was related to his association with Zhao, who had mysteriously died during his tenure as mayor. On Yuan's orders, Wang was executed.

Preceded by Zhang Guangjian	Mayor of Beijing; October 1913 – March 1914	Succeeded by Shen Jinjian

== Bibliography ==
- 「民国初年北京市市長王治馨墓志銘現身莱陽（図）」2008.6.2. 新華網（『煙台日報』が原典）
- Xu Youchun (徐友春) (main ed.) (2007). Unabridged Biographical Dictionary of the Republic, Revised and Enlarged Version (民国人物大辞典 增订版). Hebei People's Press (Hebei Renmin Chubanshe; 河北人民出版社). ISBN 978-7-202-03014-1.
- 劉寿林ほか編 (1995). 民国職官年表. Zhonghua Book Company. ISBN 7-101-01320-1.
