= Chengdu protests of 1989 =

Student protests in Chengdu, China

The Chengdu Protests of 1989 started out as a memorial gathering to mourn Hu Yaobang's death in Tianfu Square and it took around five days before larger-scale protests broke out. While the Chengdu students were protesting in support of the 1989 Tiananmen Square protests and massacre, they had different demands from the Beijing students. On June 4 and 5, the protests were violently crushed by security forces, with estimates of the death toll ranging from the official figure of 8 to "at least 300" per Amnesty International.

According to Paul Goldin, who was an American student studying Chinese at Sichuan University and is now a Professor of Chinese thought at the University of Pennsylvania, the protests were “never a protest in favour of democracy.” Goldin believed that “it was a protest against corruption” and it was not until “very very late” that students began using words like “democracy” and “freedom.”

== Start of protests ==
On April 21 and 22, there were large marches and arrests, but it was not until May 15 that class boycotts and hunger strikes began.

On May 16, there were around 30,000 students, faculty, and clerical workers gathered at Renmin Square. The crowd was there largely to support the students in Beijing but also to protest police tactics. On May 17 there was another demonstration, at 10 p.m that night and around 100 students announced they were going on a hunger strike.

On May 18 at 4 p.m, “Provincial Vice-Party Secretary Gu Jinchi, Provincial Standing Committee member and Propaganda Department Director Xu Chuan, Provincial Standing Committee member and Chengdu Municipal Party Secretary Wu Xihai, Provincial Vice-Governor Pu Haiqing, Chengdu Mayor Xie Jinxiang and other leading comrades from the provincial and municipal party and government went to Chengdu's South People's Road Square” and visited the students who were hunger striking and petitioning.

Gu Jinchi was supportive of the students and told them that he “fully [understood their] patriotic enthusiasm, fasting in support of some Beijing students’ hunger-strike action, opposing corruption, promoting democracy and the rule-of-law, and demanding a deepening of reforms. Party Center is attaching a great deal of importance to your actions.” However, he also wanted them to cease hunger striking and return to classes. The “leading comrades” did show concern for the health and safety of the students.

The protests remained peaceful and after martial law was declared in Beijing, the protests in Chengdu started to dwindle. By then, only a handful of students were still having sit-ins and local residents were beginning to lose interest.

== June 4–8 ==
On June 4, the Chengdu Public Security Bureau “announced that traffic into the square on People's South Road would be halted.” After the announcement more than half of the 300 students sitting in front of the square left. The police forced the 51 remaining students to leave at 7:45 that morning. Later on that morning 2000 students from “Sichuan University, West China Medical University, Chengdu University of Science and Technology, and Sichuan College of Education” marched onto People's Road.

The students held banners that read “Blood debts must be repaid in blood,” “Seven thousand Beijing students were suppressed,” and “Give us back our fellow students.” Their march was stopped by a line of police who, according to eyewitness reports, used tear gas and concussion grenades to control crowds, attacking individual protesters with truncheons, knives and electric cattle prods. However, unlike Tiananmen, there was "little gunfire". By 3p.m, “the precinct station on People's East Road was set on fire” and “the station and some nearby stores and restaurants burned to the ground.”

The fires continued on June 5 with the burning of a shopping mall in southwest Chengdu, the Rose Empress Restaurant, a movie theatre, and two police stations. The next day the newspaper kiosk in front of the Rose Empress Hotel was also set on fire. There was also a lot of damage done to state property, like police trucks and ambulances. An eyewitness claimed that ambulances were "prevented from functioning" and hospitals were ordered not to accept wounded protesters.

On June 6 “five thousand students left their campuses.” Many of the shops were closed. Three hundred police from Public Security and the People's Armed Police arrested the suspects who set fire to Sichuan Exhibition Hall and robbed the Tiancheng Jewelry store.

On June 7, in a news report published by the Sichuan Daily, that the provincial and municipal governments “resolutely attacked a tiny minority of criminal elements hellbent on sowing destruction and mayhem” and that the students “welcomed the provincial and city governments’ decisive measures in sternly attacking the beating, smashing, looting, and burning by illegal criminal elements.” The report also stated that the province and city are taking steps to insure “social safety networks among the masses.”

By June 8, the city had calmed down and “traffic [was] back to normal.”

== Witness accounts ==
Early on in the protests (May 16), more than a thousand police came into Chengdu and tried to clear the main square. According to Judy Wyman Kelly, who was a doctoral student in Chengdu at the time, the police brutality against the students only garnered them more support.

On June 4, an American couple, Dennis Rea and Anne Joiner who were teaching at Chengdu University of Technology, were able to witness the protests firsthand. The pair went to a small clinic that was treating the injured and nearby they saw a chain of people walking through the streets to help injured people get to safety. They witnessed the beating of “a barely disguised policeman” and the casualties of people who were not involved with the protests at all, like a fruit vendor who had just parked “his cart in the wrong place at the wrong time.”

Kim Nygaard, an American who witnessed the protests, found refuge at the hotel she was staying at along with other foreigners. From her hotel window, she saw the security forces putting protestors into sandbags and stacking their bodies into trucks. She remembered seeing the security forces wiring a detainee's arm behind his back by breaking his arms. They were then loaded into trucks and taken away. Nygaard noted that there was no noise coming from the pile of bodies and thinking that “there were definitely lifeless bodies.”

Another witness, Jean Brick, described a similar account. Brick was able to note that some of the bodies had the “students’ white headbands" and there was a pile of “30 to 40 abandoned plastic flip-flops commonly worn by workers, farmers, and unemployed people.”

Karl Hutterer, a visiting professor of anthropology from the University of Michigan Ann Arbor, personally witnessed the violence and in a letter to the New York Times stated that "there was a consensus that from 300 to 400 people had been killed and upward of 1,000 wounded".

== Aftermath ==
In response to the events that took place in Chengdu, the government quickly released its account of what happened. The Sichuan Provincial government published an article titled The Whole Story of the Chengdu Riots. Within this article it was reported that “1,800 people sought medical treatment, including 1,100 policemen, 353 were admitted to the hospital and among them 231 policemen, 69 students and 53 others.”

According to a “U.S State department cable released by WikiLeaks the real toll was probably higher.” The hospitals and universities within Chengdu confirmed higher death tolls on their own, as well as the American consular officials who had reported to the New York Times “at least 100 seriously wounded people had been carried out of the square.”

After June 16, “106 people had been arrested, two peasants charged with setting fires to vehicles were executed, three others were executed for unbridled beating, smashing, looting and burning, one person was put to death for overturning a jeep and setting fire to it [and] three separate life sentences were given for arson, looting, and disturbing the peace.”

== See also ==
- 1989 Tiananmen Square protests and massacre
- 1989 Chinese protests by region
