= Li Qiyan =

Chinese politician

Li Qiyan (Chinese: 李其炎; pinyin: Lǐ Qíyán) (October 1938 – 3 June 2020) was a Chinese politician who served as mayor of Beijing from February 1993 to November 1996. He was originally from Qihe County in Shandong province. Li joined the Chinese Communist Party in November 1961. He was a member of the 14th Central Committee of the Chinese Communist Party. Qiyan died on June 3, 2020, at the age of 81.

Political offices
Preceded by Chen Xitong	Mayor of Beijing; 1993–1996	Succeeded by Jia Qinglin
