= Wang Da =

Chinese politician

Wang Da (Chinese: 王達) (1881–1946) was a politician of the Republic of China. He was born in Xuancheng, Anhui. He was the 5th Republican mayor of Beijing.

Preceded by Shen Jinjian	Mayor of Beijing; 1915–1920	Succeeded by Wang Hu

== Bibliography ==
- 徐友春主編 (2007). 民国人物大辞典 増訂版|和書. 河北人民出版社. ISBN 978-7-202-03014-1.
- 外務省情報部編 (1928). 改訂 現代支那人名鑑|. 東亜同文会調査編纂部.
- 劉寿林ほか編 (1995). 民国職官年表|. Zhonghua Book Company. ISBN 7-101-01320-1.
- 宣城地区地方志編纂委員会編 (1998). 宣城地区志|. 方志出版社. ISBN 9787807079118.
