= Ethel Margaret Phillips =

British medical missionary

- Born: 1876; Bridgnorth, UK
- Died: 17 May 1951 (aged 74–75); Bridgwater, UK
- Occupation: Medical missionary
- Years active: 1905 - 1948
- Known for: St. Agatha's Hospital, Shandong;

Ethel Margaret Phillips (1876–1951) was a British medical missionary who worked in China for approximately 43 years. Before becoming a medical missionary, Phillips gained admittance into the Victoria University of Manchester and subsequently became the third woman to graduate with a degree in medicine from the University. Upon graduating, Phillips was sent to China as a medical missionary by the Society for the Propagation of the Gospel (SPG). In China, Phillips faced some difficulty with the local population, as they did not trust foreigners after the political turmoil that had taken place recently before Phillips' arrival. Her accomplishments in China include the construction of two hospitals, work with the YWCA, and the establishment of a private practice. Phillips was interned in China during the Second World War. Phillips returned to the UK in 1948 and died three years later.

== Early life ==
Ethel Margaret Phillips was born in England in 1876 and had a difficult childhood as the second of four children. When she was an infant, her father who had trained as an engineer but contracted tuberculosis, took up a business in mineral water production in Bridgnorth but left his wife and children at their original home. When she was about four years old, her mother left the family, taking Phillips’ youngest brother, Herbert, with her. It was decided that all the other children would leave Bridgnorth, a small town in England, to live with their grandmother. After less than a year Phillips was then sent to attend school in London. Much of Phillips' childhood was spent living with unpleasant hosts and being passed from school to school. She also suffered from ill-health with suspected tuberculosis and fibroids, eventually needing a hysterectomy. Phillips began earning her living from the age of fifteen through teaching at Rushmore College, a private school located in Kidderminster, Shropshire. She took on various teaching jobs for the next few years, while also continuing her own studies. Phillips passed the Cambridge examination and then became an Associate of the Royal College of Preceptors.

== Education ==
In September 1898, Phillips took the college entrance exam, passed it, and enrolled at the University of Manchester. Women had been only recently allowed admittance into the University and were not yet allowed to enroll in the medical program. In her first term, Phillips took many science courses and when the medical school began accepting women, during Phillips' second term, she transferred right away. In 1905, Phillips graduated from the University of Manchester with a bachelor of medicine and surgery, making her only the third woman to graduate from the University with a degree in medicine. She was awarded several scholarships and medals during her university studies.

== Calling ==
Around the time that Phillips was eleven, she heard a sermon given by a member of the London Missionary Society. After hearing the sermon, Phillips began to ponder the idea of becoming a missionary in the future. However, she decided that she was too shy to preach and abandoned the idea. As a young woman, her medical conditions meant she had made frequent visits to hospital, and she developed the ambition to become a medical doctor. These aspirations came together when Phillips was short on money. A friend advised her to apply for a scholarship from the Society for Promoting Christian Knowledge to help to pay for her school tuition. To qualify, Phillips needed to go abroad as a missionary doctor and apply to a specific mission. Phillips decided to take the offer and applied to the Society for the Propagation of Gospel, who also provided her with training. Originally wishing to go to India, Phillips was instead assigned to China and arrived there on 23 October 1905.

== Work in China ==
=== Political background ===
The Boxer Rebellion took place about five years prior to Phillips' arrival in China. The uprising was a response to the foreign religious influence brought over by traders and missionaries. Women missionaries were not well received in China at this time because of the unconventional role they took on through working outside the household. Despite violence, Western missionaries were not deterred from their mission work. Phillips arrived in China after the Boxer Rebellion but still experienced the aftereffects. People were not keen on Western practices in religion or medicine, so Phillips' patients might not adhere to her treatment recommendations.

=== Peking ===
When Phillips arrived in China, contemporary Chinese and Western medical practices were very different. Chinese medicine mostly used traditional methods, rather than the science-based methods developing in the West. Phillips encountered many herbal medications in China; herbal remedies and acupuncture were both very popular treatments. She also noted that people would seek advice from additional doctors if one did not provide an immediate cure.

After arriving in Peking, Phillips started to learn Chinese. She worked under Dr. Aspland, another medical missionary, who put her in charge of women and children outpatients and the women's ward at the dispensary. Phillips worked with Dr. Aspland in Peking for six months and also visited other mission hospitals in the area to gain experience. During this time in Peking, Phillips developed an acute case of Tuberculosis and was advised by Dr. Aspland to leave Peking and go to the country for fresh air. During six weeks at the mission rest-house, Phillips' idealistic view of mission work became slightly tarnished by the lack of friendliness displayed by her coworkers in Peking.

=== Pinyin Mission Station ===
After recovering, a Bishop from a nearby diocese requested Phillips' presence in Pinyin where The Society for the Propagation of the Gospel had opened a mission station in 1879. Phillips arrived at the mission station on 9 March 1906. There were no other mission stations present in the area while Phillips was there. She often did not see eye-to-eye with the missionaries and wished to build a permanent hospital. In 1908, Phillips received permission to build the hospital that she had requested, and St. Agatha's Hospital was opened on 5 February 1909 with official dedication on 1 May.

=== St. Agatha's Hospital ===
St. Agatha's Hospital was the first hospital that was built in the diocese of Shandong. The hospital was also the first women's hospital to be opened in the entire district. The first patients were admitted on 15 November. Phillips introduced a policy that only necessary cases would be admitted, and patients had to pay a fee. They also had to pay for their food if they decided to leave before their treatment was complete, to encourage patients to stay for the full course, and she also prevented people from attending only for free food. On 27 December 1909, the first infant was born at the hospital. Phillips was given the Chinese name Lady of Thunder because of her resolute character following the establishment of this hospital.

=== Furlough ===
Phillips seldom left China but did take a furlough following the opening of St. Agatha's Hospital, beginning on 4 July. She sailed to America, going to Hawaii, San Francisco, Salt Lake City, Chicago, and then Canada. After that, Phillips travelled to London and was diagnosed unfit to return to China for health reasons by the Society for the Propagation of the Gospel. In March 1913, Phillips decided that she felt well enough to return to her work in China and requested to work at the Canadian Church Mission in Henan Province. Her request was accepted and Phillips prepared for her return.

=== Kaifeng and St. Paul's Hospital ===
In Kaifeng, at the Canadian Church Mission, Phillips was considered a senior missionary due to her prior experience and ability to speak Chinese. The Bishop in charge of the mission placed Phillips in command of the women's work, the supervision of the boys' orphanage, and the construction of the new hospital. St. Paul's Hospital opened in November 1914. Not long after the opening, the mission began to deteriorate; two missionaries had already resigned. At this time, the mission was ordered to close the hospital until World War I was over. After closing down the hospital, Phillips did not wish to join any more missions, for her initial view of missionary work had been ruined.

=== Return to Peking ===
Back in Peking, Phillips translated nursing training material into Chinese. Then, from September 1915, Phillips taught medicine in Chinese at the Union Medical College for Women. The classes included hygiene and public health as well as other medical topics. Phillips also attended classes with her students at the Peking Union Medical College to translate the curriculum for them. She also agreed to be the visiting physician for the Society for the Propagation of the Gospel, but when asked to join the mission again officially, Phillips declined, no longer wishing to be affiliated with a specific mission.

Phillips rented a house to open her own private practice. Her patients included foreign nationals as well as Chinese. For additional income, she rented rooms to paying guests. Along with teaching and her medical practice, Phillips was also made the unofficial physician for the YWCA, in which she helped Chinese women medically and socially.

While in Peking, Phillips adopted a two-year-old European boy, whom she called Clifford. He was sent to England at the age of 16 to continue his education. He remained in the UK, serving in the RAF during World War II and did not meet his mother until it ended.

==== Phillips and the YWCA ====
The YWCA was brought to China at the start of the twentieth century to provide a support system and to help Chinese women to move away from their original roles in the household. Phillips was consistently concerned with the betterment of women and children throughout her work in China. While working with the YWCA, Phillips wanted to create mother's clubs. Peking's YWCA successfully established a mother's club for women coming from lower income families. At the same time, Phillips pushed the creation of a Home Training School in which students would learn care for the sick, cleanliness, and a number of other simple tasks. Phillips was very firm in her beliefs of serving others.

== Late life ==
Phillips had little impact from the political turmoil that was taking place in China until World War II began. As World War II started, she was running a tuberculosis sanatorium that was growing quickly. This was closed when the Japanese began their occupation of Peking. Along with the sanatorium, the Anglican Mission Girls' School where Phillips was doing health inspections was closed. On 7 December 1941, Phillips was declared by the Japanese to be an enemy alien because of her British ties. She was subsequently put under house arrest for a short while. Not long after being released, Phillips was ordered to evacuate Peking and was taken to the Weixian Internment Compound in Shandong Province. She remained there until the people in the camp were freed at the end of World War II on 17 August 1945.

Phillips was reunited with her son Clifford after her release, and became a grandmother in 1946. Feeling that it was impractical to recover her private medical practice, she took a position with Radio Peking, broadcasting a half-hour program three times each week. With the Chinese Civil War looming overhead, Clifford convinced his mother that it was time to leave China and, after 43 years, Phillips left China to live with her brother in Bridgwater, UK in 1948. She suffered after effects from the Weixian Internment Camp and died of congestive heart failure on 17 May 1951.

== Bibliography ==
- Drucker, A. R. (1979). The role of the YWCA in the development of the Chinese women's movement, 1890–1927. Social Service Review, 53(3), 421–440.
- Duiker, W. J. (1978). Cultures in collision: The boxer rebellion. San Rafael: Presidio Press.
- Phillips, C. H. (2003). In Jill Fallis (Ed.), The lady named thunder: A biography of dr. Ethel Margaret Phillips (1876–1951). Edmonton, Alberta: The University of Alberta Press.
- Rui-Juan, X. (1988). Microcirculation and traditional Chinese medicine. JAMA: The Journal of the American Medical Association, 260(12), 1755–1777. doi: 10.1001/jama.1988.03410120101035
