= Li Yuan (ROC politician) =

Chinese politician and mayor of Beiping

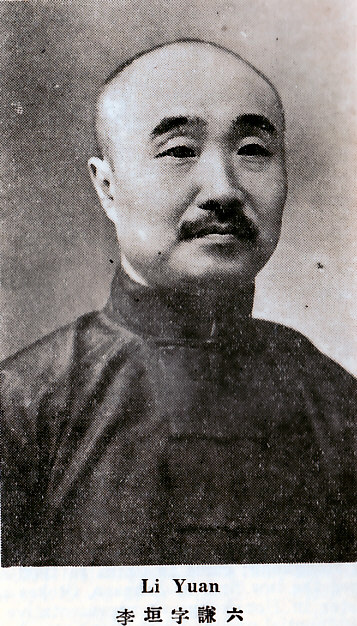
- Born: 1879; Beijing
- Disappeared: 1935 (aged 43-44)
- Occupation: politician
- Known for: co-creating the East Hebei Autonomous Council

Li Yuan (Chinese: 李垣; pinyin: Lǐ Yuán; born 1879) was a politician of the Republic of China and later Manchukuo.

== Background ==
He was born in Beijing. A loyalist of Fengtian clique warlord Zhang Zuolin, he became the 12th Republican mayor of his hometown on September 4, 1926. He had been acting mayor since May. In February 1933, Li travelled to Chita, Zabaykalsky Krai in the Soviet Union to be consul general on behalf of the government of Manchukuo.

== Disappearance ==
In November 1935, Li and Yin Ju-keng created the East Hebei Autonomous Council. The circumstances of his later life and death are unknown.

Preceded by Liu Ji	Mayor of Beijing; 1926–1927	Succeeded by Zhang Jixin

== See also ==
- List of people who disappeared

== Bibliography ==
- Xu Youchun (徐友春) (main ed.) (2007). Unabridged Biographical Dictionary of the Republic, Revised and Enlarged Version (民国人物大辞典 增订版). Hebei People's Press (Hebei Renmin Chubanshe; 河北人民出版社). ISBN 978-7-202-03014-1.
- 高木翔之助 (1937). 冀東政権の正体|和書. 北支那社.
- 劉寿林ほか編 (1995). 民国職官年表|和書. 中華書局. ISBN 7-101-01320-1.
- 尾崎秀実監修「アジア人名辞典」アジア問題講座 12|和書. 創元社. 1940.
