= Li Ximing =

Chinese politician

Li Ximing (simplified Chinese: 李锡铭; traditional Chinese: 李錫銘; pinyin: Lǐ Xīmíng; February 1926 – November 10, 2008) was the Chinese Communist Party boss in Beijing during the 1989 crackdown on pro-democracy protests in the capital and across the country.

Li was elected to the 13th Politburo of the Chinese Communist Party on November 2, 1987 by the 13th Central Committee of the Chinese Communist Party.

== Tiananmen Square protests of 1989 ==
In late April 1989, the official press reported that Li and Beijing mayor Chen Xitong would be willing to consider disclosing their wealth, apparently in response to student claims of corruption by Government officials.

On May 20, 1989, the New China News Agency released an English-language transcript of remarks from Prime Minister Li Peng cited a briefing from Li Ximing in which Li described the situation in Beijing as already "anarchic" and getting worse, with increasing violations of law and order. The briefing stated that the situation had begun to "cool down" before the start of May, in response to "great efforts", but that the turmoil had since revived.

A speech written by Li in May 1989 criticizing the student protests and implicitly criticizing General Secretary of the Chinese Communist Party Zhao Ziyang (a reformer who sympathized with the demonstrators and was ultimately purged from power) was passed on to mid-level party officials with instructions that it be studied and then passed down to local units. The New York Times reported that some of these officials balked at passing the speech to lower levels or did not fully comply with the terms of the request.

Li, along with Chen Xitong, was described as part of a group of conservatives who advocated for a military response to the student protests in Tiananmen Square in 1989, though Li himself did not play a public role in the official crackdown. As reported in the Tiananmen Papers, published in 2001, Li and Chen foreclosed the option of negotiating with the students by describing the protests as an "anti-party and anti-Socialist political struggle". In Beijing, the resulting military actions on the night of June 3–4, 1989 left many civilians dead or injured, with reported tolls ranged from 200 to 300 (PRC government figures) and to 2,000–3,000 (Chinese student associations and Chinese Red Cross).

== After Tiananmen Square ==
In October 1992, Li was one of eight officials who submitted resignations to the Politburo of the Chinese Communist Party as part of a major shakeup in which the majority of the 14 seats on the Politburo were to be replaced. Li was one of a number of hardliners included in the list who was described as having been pushed out.

He was vice chairman of the Standing Committee of the 8th National People's Congress, China's top legislative body, which was in session from 1993 to 1998.

Li died at age 82 on November 10, 2008 in Beijing. A statement released by the CCP announcing his death described Li as "an outstanding CPC member, a long-tested and loyal Communist fighter and an excellent leader in his work".

Party political offices
Preceded by Duan Junyi	Secretary of the CCP Beijing Committee; 1984–1992	Succeeded by Chen Xitong
