= Shen Jinjian =

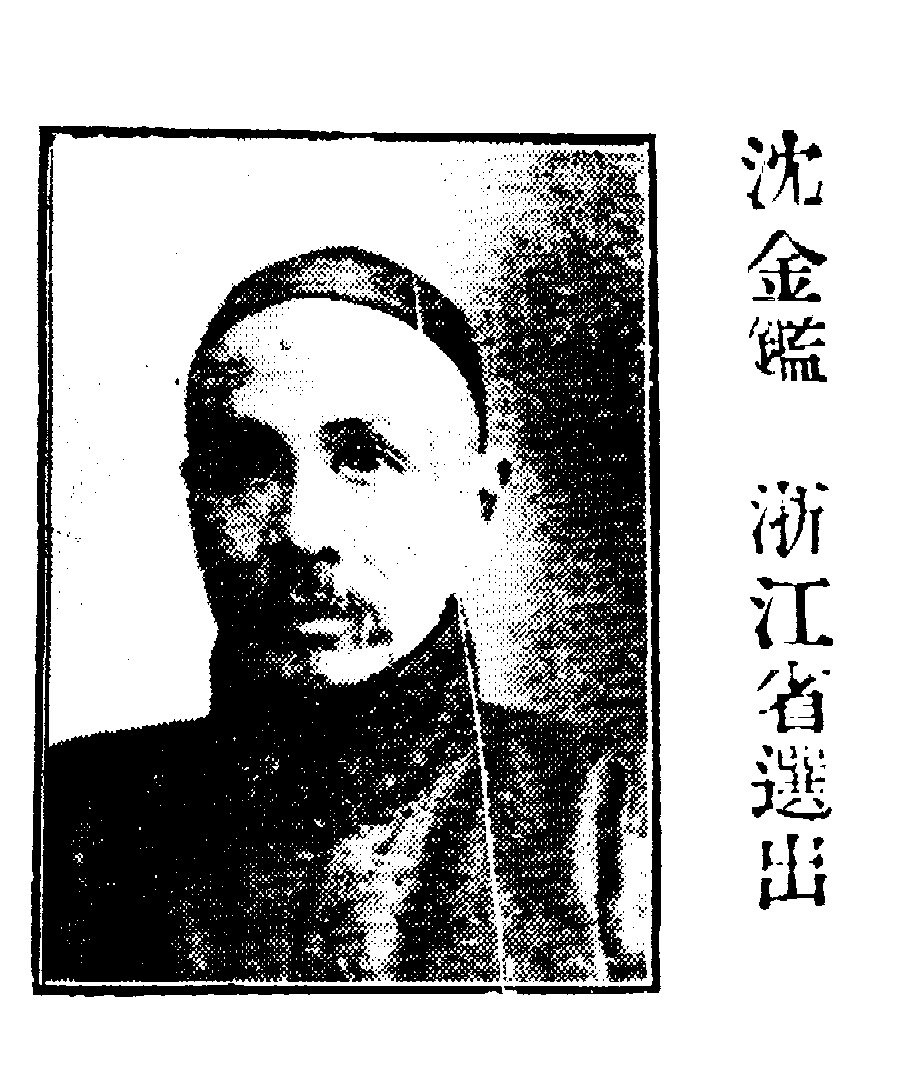
Shen Jinjian

Shen Jinjian (Chinese: 沈金鑑) (1875–1924) was a politician of the Republic of China, the 4th Republican mayor of Beijing. He was born in Huzhou, Zhejiang.

Preceded by Wang Zhixin	Mayor of Beijing; March 23, 1914 – September 1915	Succeeded by Wang Da

== Bibliography ==
- Xu Youchun (徐友春) (main ed.) (2007). Unabridged Biographical Dictionary of the Republic, Revised and Enlarged Version (民国人物大辞典 增订版). Hebei People's Press (Hebei Renmin Chubanshe; 河北人民出版社). ISBN 978-7-202-03014-1.
- 劉寿林ほか編 (1995). 民国職官年表. 中華書局. ISBN 7-101-01320-1.
