= Zhang Jixin =

Chinese calligrapher and politician

Zhang Jixin (simplified Chinese: 张济新; traditional Chinese: 張濟新; pinyin: Zhāng Jìxīn; 1874–1952) was a Chinese calligrapher and politician of the Republic of China. He was born in Tieling in modern Liaoning. He was the 13th mayor of Beijing as a member of the Beiyang government.

Preceded by Li Yuan	Mayor of Beijing; September 1927 – June 1928	Succeeded by Li Shengpei

== Bibliography ==
- Xu Youchun (徐友春) (main ed.) (2007). Unabridged Biographical Dictionary of the Republic, Revised and Enlarged Version (民国人物大辞典 增订版). Hebei People's Press (Hebei Renmin Chubanshe; 河北人民出版社). ISBN 978-7-202-03014-1.
- 劉国銘主編 (2005). 中国国民党百年人物全書|和書. 団結出版社. ISBN 7-80214-039-0.
- 劉寿林ほか編 (1995). 民国職官年表|和書. 中華書局. ISBN 7-101-01320-1.
- 「義達里：婉容外祖父的貝勒府」『北京青年報』2006年10月24日。
