= 1989 Chinese protests by region =

Hu Yaobang was removed from his position as General Secretary of the Chinese Communist Party by Deng Xiaoping, the most influential of the CCP elders, following the 1986 Chinese student demonstrations. After Hu died on 15 April 1989, residents and students in Beijing began holding commemorative activities for Hu Yaobang. These gradually developed into calls for political reform and protests directed against the Chinese Communist Party. The movement became known as the 1989 Democracy Movement or the "June Fourth Incident"; Chinese authorities officially refer to it as the "political turmoil between the spring and summer of 1989".

Protests of varying sizes also took place in other provinces and cities of the People's Republic of China, although contemporary media coverage focused primarily on the protests in and around Tiananmen Square in Beijing. Demonstrations elsewhere in China frequently took place in response to events in Beijing. Students and other citizens from different parts of the country travelled to Beijing to make contact with protesters and observe the movement, while Beijing student organizations also sent "delegations" to other parts of China to publicize the movement. The scale of demonstrations and the extent of participation by the wider population varied considerably from place to place, and in some cities protesters raised demands concerning local issues. Local authorities also differed in their responses to protesters both during the movement and after the June Fourth crackdown. Most protests outside Beijing gradually subsided within about two weeks of the crackdown in Beijing. Public security authorities subsequently carried out arrests and prosecutions of participants and intensified political and ideological education among university students and government cadres.

On 18 May, influenced by the hunger strike being held by students in Beijing, more than 500,000 students reportedly took part in demonstrations outside Beijing, involving more than 30 major cities and over 300 institutions of higher education. Students in 14 cities outside Beijing also organized hunger strikes, involving approximately 2,500 participants according to incomplete statistics. On 19 May, large-scale student protests took place in at least 116 cities. According to statistics later released by China's State Education Commission, "during the turmoil and riot, more than 2.8 million instances of participation in street demonstrations occurred at more than 600 institutions of higher education in 84 cities across 29 provinces, municipalities and autonomous regions."

According to statistics compiled by Chinese authorities, between 16 April and 25 June public security agencies throughout the country dismantled 302 organizations described by the authorities as "illegal organizations", identified 3,178 members of such organizations, and confiscated 205 firearms, three boxes containing 25,428 rounds of ammunition, 496 items described as "weapons", 60,713 pieces of "reactionary printed material", 1,572 "reactionary audio-visual products", and 360 items of military equipment. A total of 11,013 people associated with the movement were detained, excluding figures for Shaanxi and Tibet. Of these, 2,085 were detained before 2 June and 8,928 after 3 June.

Those detained were officially classified as including "unemployed or unaffiliated persons", students, peasants, cadres, workers and self-employed people, as well as people described by the authorities as "remnants of the Gang of Four" and former prisoners. The authorities categorized the alleged offences as including "organizing and plotting riots and turmoil", "counter-revolutionary propaganda and incitement", damaging or burning military and police vehicles, assaulting soldiers and police officers, seizing or concealing firearms and ammunition, attacking or burning party, government and military institutions, disrupting railway and urban transportation, violating martial-law orders, looting military or police supplies, robbing banks and shops, damaging public facilities, and burning civilian vehicles, shops and cinemas. Measures taken against those detained included arrest, re-education through labour, administrative punishment and release following "education".

According to a report submitted by the Party Committee of the Ministry of Public Security to the CCP Central Committee on 30 June, entitled "Report on Resolutely Striking at Counter-revolutionaries, Elements Involved in the Two Disturbances, and Serious Criminal Offenders", a nationwide campaign of arrests following the events resulted in "the banning of 515 illegal organizations; 718 leaders of illegal organizations registering with or surrendering to public security organs; the detention of 4,386 members of illegal organizations and persons involved in smashing, looting, burning and other activities; the uncovering of 31 counter-revolutionary group cases; and eight cases involving Kuomintang agents from Taiwan."

Much of the available information concerning protests outside Beijing has come from leaked Chinese government documents, accounts by Chinese dissidents, and reports by foreign journalists who were in China at the time.

Xia Ming, a participant in the 1989 Tiananmen Square protests in Shanghai and one of the group known as the "Seven Gentlemen of Fudan University", later commented:

The expression "Tiananmen massacre" needs to be reconsidered. What we saw was that the killings of 1989 began first in Lhasa, Tibet, in March, followed by the imposition of military martial law in Beijing in May. The "June Fourth massacre in Beijing" marked the climax of the CCP's violence, after which killings also took place in Chengdu, Changsha, and elsewhere. In the following months, from Taiyuan to Shanghai, from Shenyang to Guangzhou, and from Xi'an to Hefei and Hangzhou, the CCP launched nationwide arrests. Countless participants in the democracy movement were arrested, imprisoned, disappeared or executed. They included not only students, but also large numbers of residents, workers, migrant workers and peasants.

== Protests in North China ==
=== Beijing ===
Beijing was the center of the movement. Throughout the protests, students, workers and residents expressed their demands through mass demonstrations, fundraising, rallies, petitions and other activities. Following the declaration of martial law in Beijing, tensions increased, and protesters repeatedly attempted to prevent military vehicles from entering the city. Tiananmen Square remained occupied by protesters until martial-law troops advanced into central Beijing on the night of 3 June.

=== Inner Mongolia ===
The largest demonstrations in Inner Mongolia occurred in the regional capital, Hohhot, where many of the autonomous region's universities were concentrated. Wuhai, Baotou, the Ih Ju League and other areas also saw varying degrees of protest activity.

==== Hohhot ====
Students in Hohhot, ranging at times up to 3,000 people, started protesting between May 11 and May 14, 1989, demanding inflation control, governmental corruption reforms, and better funding for education. Many also asked for information regarding possible shady dealings being done by the region's most senior Party official, Ulanfu.

On May 19 roughly 10,000 students were still taking to the streets. By May 22 most demonstrations began to decline in numbers. Students would still remain on strike for the next four days with less than a third staying on campuses.

Anger towards Premier Li Peng once again riled students in Hohhot on May 29, and approximately 4,000 marched in the city demanding his resignation.

Students and teachers marched in a crowd of 4,000 when they heard of the June 4, massacre in Beijing. Chanting slogans about revenge, they were greeted by roughly 10,000 citizens when they reached the city's main square.

=== Hebei ===
Because of the close proximity of Beijing, Tianjin and Hebei, many students and demonstrators from Hebei travelled to Beijing or Tianjin to establish contacts with protesters there. Demonstrations involved university students and other residents in Baoding, Shijiazhuang and other parts of the province. Several developments in Hebei were connected with the military because many of the units deployed in the crackdown in Beijing were normally based in the province. After the June Fourth crackdown, demonstrators surrounded the headquarters in Shijiazhuang of the 27th Group Army, which had participated in the enforcement of martial law in Beijing.

==== Shijiazhuang石家庄 ====
Shijiazhuang石家庄 saw its first student demonstrations with the release of the April 26 Editorial. Four days later a report came to the central government warning that the students in the city were becoming more rebellious.

On May 17, 1989, roughly 10,000 students and 200 journalists marched in support of the Beijing students and demanded dialogue and freedom of the press. Later in the day, 5,000 broke off and were able to get into the provincial government buildings and present their petitions to the authorities. The next day, May 18, saw some government employees, medical staff, and high school students join in the protests and the total crowds of marchers and onlookers swelled to about 150,000.

=== Shanxi ===
Demonstrations took place in Linfen, Yuci, Taigu and other parts of Shanxi, with the largest protests occurring in the provincial capital, Taiyuan. The Shanxi Provincial People's Government was repeatedly confronted by demonstrators.

==== Taiyuan太原 ====
Student demonstrations began in Taiyuan after the April 26 Editorial. After the failed Yuan Mu dialogue on April 29, 1989, the protests were reported to the central government as becoming more rebellious in nature on April 30.

After a declaration by Beijing student leaders on May 4 most students around the country returned for classes except for many in Taiyuan who were in the midst of protesting a remark made by a city official. Five days later approximately 5,000 students sat in near the provincial government offices demanding to talk to party official Wang Senhao after a failed dialogue on May 8.

On May 10 a major event happened when demonstrators interrupted opening ceremonies for an international economic technology conference, import-export fair, and an art and culture festival. The students’ slogans drew the interest of some of the onlookers and the total crowd is estimated to have reached 20,000. Once again demanding to meet Wang Senhao, the students went to the outside the provincial buildings and tried to enter them three times. That evening students returned to their campuses when they were promised that they would be able to meet with the governor at a later time.

The local government followed through on May 15 when, after a crowd of 10,000 had gathered once more outside of the provincial buildings. Wang Senhao and other officials met with 33 student representatives. After students made their major point, that the luxury in which the new government buildings had been suited with was a waste of money, Wang agreed to additional talks with students. This ended the demonstrations for the evening.

Three days later on May 18 roughly 230 hunger strikers had been fasting for two days and demonstrator numbers reached 30,000. That morning saw violence break out near the provincial government building when some people threw bricks at the police lightly injuring over 80 police and another 8 people. Roughly 60 people were arrested due to this. Later that day over 130,000 marchers took to the streets chanting anti-Chairman Deng Xiaoping and President Yang Shangkun slogans.

From May 20 to May 22, in reaction to the declaration of martial law in Beijing, students created propaganda teams to try an elicit additional aid from workers, with a reported 1,000 students going to a steel company to distribute pamphlets. Three days later on May 25, the first workers started to march in demand of the resignation of Li Peng.

In reaction to the crackdown in Beijing on June 4, students numbering around 4,000 marched with banners with slogans demanding justice for those killed in the nation's capital.

=== Tianjin天津 ===
Tianjin, which is close to Beijing, saw protests, demonstrations, class boycotts, rallies and other forms of political expression from an early stage of the movement. Political and social movements in Tianjin, Beijing and Hebei frequently influenced one another. Students from institutions including Nankai University and Tianjin University participated actively in demonstrations in Tianjin, and many travelled to Tiananmen Square in Beijing. During several demonstrations in May, participation in Tianjin ranged from more than 10,000 to several tens of thousands.

On the evening of April 15, after the death of Hu Yaobang, approximately 2,000 students marched in mourning around the campus of Nankai University 南开大学 in Tianjin天津. On April 17 and 18, 1989, students were mostly confined to the campus of the university, however, by April 24, students at Nankai had begun to boycott classes. They marched in crowds that gathered to over 20,000 and now carried banners and signs. Large student protests occurred again to the April 26 Editorial two days later.

These student protests would carry on into the Yuan Mu debate which sparked other demonstrations across the country. According to a report the next day on April 3, more posters were seen in Nankai University after these two incidents and roughly half of the student population was now boycotting classes.

According to Robert C. Cosbey, who was teaching at Nankai in 1989, between the Yuan dialogue and May 16, some student protests managed to gather as many as 50,000 additional onlookers.

On May 25, Tianjin saw even more protests not just by students, but by intellectuals and writers. These protests were again viewed by over 50,000 onlookers.

== Protests in Northeast China ==
=== Jilin ===
Large-scale student-led protests began in Changchun and subsequently spread elsewhere in Jilin. Some workers, residents and people employed within state institutions also joined the movement. Employees of FAW Group were particularly active, and participation in demonstrations at one point exceeded 100,000 people. Outside Changchun, demonstrations also took place in Baicheng, Jilin City, the Yanbian Korean Autonomous Prefecture and elsewhere. After news of the June Fourth crackdown reached the province, protests intensified before eventually being suppressed. Authorities banned several organizations and detained nearly 100 people.

==== Changchun长春 ====
Some of the earliest demonstrations to have at least occurred in Changchun were in response to the April 26 Editorial. Roughly 3,000 students from Jilin University, and other universities, began to hold a sit-in demanding that officials talk with them. Eventually, the crowd was dispersed peacefully by police, party, and education officials.

After the failed dialogue between Yuan Mu and several Beijing student leaders, students in Changchun took to the streets on April 29, 1989. Students would continue to march on May 19 in numbers of around 10,000, and two days later tried to garner support from workers at a nearby automobile factory.

Changchun citizens reacted to the June 4 crackdown in Beijing by marching in numbers of around 4,000 and chanted about their shock at the violence.

=== Heilongjiang ===
In Heilongjiang, demonstrations took place in cities including Qiqihar, while protests in the provincial capital, Harbin, were the most active and received support from some workers, residents and journalists. Following reports of the crackdown in Beijing, the protests intensified.

==== Harbin哈尔滨 ====
The capital of Heilongjiang saw around 9,000 students demonstrate in front of the provincial government buildings on May 15, 1989. They declared their support for the student protests in Beijing and demanded that the governor of the province, Shao Qihui, come out to for dialogue. After a long standoff with police, the vice governor came out to try and pacify the crowd by taking the petition and said that the governor would talk with them on May 20. The students, unhappy with this, continued to demand Shao come out until he finally did. Unable to immediately appease the students, dialogue between the demonstrators and the governor went on well into the night.

After several days of continuous protesting, May 17 saw the student protesters in Harbin numbering at 25,000, nearly half of the entire student population in the city. Participants started to see the movement as more than just temporary and started to create their own autonomous student organizations and prepared for their own hunger strikes.

By May 31 things managed to settle down in the city and students started to calm down. In Heilongjiang University officials made an agreement with the student federation to continue their operation and the federation, in good will, recalled students from Beijing.

As early as the night of June 3 people in Harbin started to hear about the military crackdown in Beijing. The next day more than 7,000 protesters took to the streets mourning those that died in Beijing all the meanwhile chanting anti-Li Peng slogans.

=== Liaoning ===
Universities in Shenyang, Dalian, Anshan and other cities organized demonstrations in support of students in Beijing. Some participants advocated more radical positions, including the creation of new political parties and the overthrow of the government. At the height of the protests, several hundred thousand students, teachers and residents reportedly took to the streets, at times blocking traffic and calling for strikes. Demonstrations and commemorative activities continued in Liaoning after the June Fourth crackdown. Authorities subsequently carried out investigations, suppressed organizations described as "illegal", and detained, sentenced or subjected numerous participants to re-education through labour. Democracy activists later alleged that political prisoners were mistreated in detention.

==== Shenyang沈阳 ====
Two days after it first broadcast in Shenyang, the April 26 Editorial drew enough ire from students that the city saw its first major demonstrations. These demonstrations sparked again when the Yuan Mu dialogue was televised.

After four consecutive days of demonstrations, more than 20,000 students marched on May 17, 1989. More spectators began to watch the students as well, with nearly 10,000 onlookers in Shenyang's Zhongshan Square alone. At the end of the day, onlookers around the students at the government buildings reportedly number at around 100,000.

== Protests in Northwest China ==
=== Gansu ===
The largest protests in Gansu occurred in the provincial capital, Lanzhou, while solidarity actions also occurred in Tianshui and elsewhere. According to public security statistics, between 21 April and 10 June the Lanzhou area experienced 30 demonstrations and petition activities, eight of which involved more than 5,000 participants, with cumulative participation approaching 200,000.

During the same period, Muslim demonstrations against the book Sexual Customs (《性风俗》), as well as clashes between Tibetan and Han students at the Lanzhou Meteorological School followed by demonstrations involving Tibetan students, contributed to what provincial authorities described as a "highly complicated situation" in Lanzhou.

==== Lanzhou兰州 ====
One of the earliest instances of student protest in Lanzhou was in response to the inconclusive televised discussion between Yuan Mu and the Beijing student leaders on April 29, 1989.

On May 9 roughly 3,000 students protested after a number of dialogues that individual campuses had with party officials and demanded a unified dialogue. Reportedly around 1,000 of these students, when conducting a sit-in outside of the Gansu provincial building, tried to break into the building itself. They were stopped by several rows of police, but not before seven police officers were injured.

By May 29 around 100 students were encamped in the main square of the city but were reportedly exhausted and looked like they were going to give up.

After hearing the news about the crackdown in Beijing, more than 3,000 students and teachers began to protest again in Lazhou in the early morning of June 4. Many separate groups comprising around 1,000 people chose to protest by lying down on train tracks going out of the city to try and shut down transportation.

=== Xinjiang ===
Protests in Xinjiang were led primarily by students and were concentrated in Ürümqi. On 19 May, Muslim demonstrations against the book Sexual Customs took place in the city and subsequently developed into the Ürümqi May 19 riot.

==== Ürümqi ====
The city of Ürümqi saw a minor demonstration between May 11 to May 15, 1989, when over 100 uranium miners staged a sit-in, partially in support of Beijing students, but mostly over concerns about radiation sickness and the government's apathy to it. The provincial government eventually did talk to them and assuaged their worries which ended the affair with the miners going home peacefully.

When they heard of the crackdown in Beijing, about 100 students in Ürümqi conducted a sit-in outside of the government building on June 5.

=== Shaanxi ===
In Shaanxi, demonstrations occurred in Xianyang, Weinan, Yan'an, Hanzhong, Shangluo, Yulin, Ankang and other cities, with the largest taking place in the provincial capital, Xi'an. Demonstrations in April were accompanied by serious unrest, during which the Shaanxi Provincial People's Government compound was stormed.

==== Xi’an西安 ====
Official reports sent to the central government suggest that student mourning of Hu Yaobing started as early as April 15, 1989 in Xi'an. Joseph Esherick, who was teaching in Xi’an at the time, noted that students from Northwest, Shaanxi Normal, and Jiaotong universities were gathering in small groups. The next day the Shaanxi Party Committee remarked that roughly 10,000 people were gathering daily and that the crowds included not just students but workers, officials, and other residents of Xi’an. The subject matter that the marchers were discussing was also starting to include topics such as inflation, salaries, and housing problems.

On April 20 a large crowd of 10,000 students broke into the Provincial Government's Office area and demanded to talk to the governor. One of their main demands was an explanation of why Hu Yaobang had been forced to resign two years earlier. Police that had already been stationed there earlier managed to hold them off. After several hours with no dialogue, the students returned to their campuses and the remaining crowds left when it began to rain.

The April 22 Incident originally started as a gathering of roughly 40,000 people who were gathered in New City Square, outside the Provincial Government Building, to watch a live feed of Hu Yaobang's funeral. Pushing back and forth between protestors and police occurred with some of the crowd angry that they could not tell if a petition concerning Hu Yaobang's resignation was accepted by the Provincial Government. Several rocks were thrown from the crowd at the police. The police responded by hitting crowd members with leather belts. Soon after this, a police vehicle with a tarp on it was set on fire and a few hours later the front gates were as well. At some point during the day some student's wreaths were received by the government and provincial governor, Hu Zongbin, even showed up. It was around this time that police in the square became more aggressive as their members who had riot gear charged the crowd with batons. By 5 p.m. most students had left the square but many private employees who finished work were brought into the melee as they passed the square. Some reports suggest that some officers and party cadres tried to halt the violence, but they were ignored. Roughly around 7 p.m. several hundred people broke into, and burned, several buildings to the west of the provincial government. One high official from these buildings was reported to have asked the police to cease violence against the protestors. An hour later police managed to clear and close down the main square. At the same time some members of the crowd fled into a nearby clothing store. The government would later say that any police brutality that occurred in the store was in response to looters that had gone in there. Although many photos and eyewitnesses attested to the violence in Xi’an on April 22, no official account acknowledges any casualties.

On April 24 another incident occurred during one of the demonstrations wherein there was reportedly “beating, smashing, robbing, and burning.” Around 270 people were taken into custody, and after preliminary interrogation, 106 were released.

An official account of the April 22 Incident was released on April 28, which downplayed the violence and causes of the incident. This caused resentment among many people throughout the city, with anti-Deng Xiaoping posters being seen on university campuses in the city.

With around 12,000 marchers on May 4, the students in Xi’an demanded the accusatory remarks made in the newspapers about the April 22 incident be redacted and that the government come to speak with the students. Shaanxi Province vice governor Sun Daren was reported to have come out and talked with some of them.

By May 17, students were again demonstrating with large posters sporting various slogans expressing their discontent, and demands, of the central government. An estimated 2,000 students departed at some point during the day by train to Beijing to join with the student movement there.

After the May 20 declaration of martial law in Beijing by the Central Government, many students in Xi’an began to return to their institutions or homes in fear of government repression. However, among the most ardent students, large protests started when rumours started floating around about several Xi’an students being killed in the nation's capital. Six days later on May 26 roughly 10,000 students rallied and called for public freedoms as well as establishing a province wide autonomous student federation.

The reactions to the June 4 crackdown in Beijing saw groups, ranging from several hundred to 2,000 participants, in Xi’an marching to express their grief. Additional demonstrations would occur over the following days and it was not until June 11 that the Xi’an government cracked down on these.

=== Qinghai ===
Protests in Qinghai were concentrated primarily in the provincial capital, Xining. Tibetan students also organized demonstrations in connection with the Tibet issue and following clashes between Tibetan and Han students in Lanzhou, Gansu. Separately, controversy surrounding the Shanghai publication Sexual Customs prompted demonstrations by Muslim Hui residents.

==== Xining西宁 ====
Xining was one of two cities to have reportedly had student demonstrations during the May 3, 1989, lull. Likewise on May 5, while students around the country had started to return to class after a declaration from Beijing student leaders, those in Xining continued to stay out of class in protest of a report printed by the local newspaper.

Several weeks later on May 26, 15 students who had returned from Beijing staged their own hunger strike in front of the provincial government building in an attempt to garner more support for demonstrations.

=== Ningxia ===
Protests in the Ningxia Hui Autonomous Region were concentrated primarily in the regional capital, Yinchuan. Hui Muslims also organized street demonstrations and petitions in opposition to the book Sexual Customs.

==== Yinchuan银川 ====
Some of Ningxia宁夏’s first major protests to have occurred were in Yinchuan with students angrily responding to the April 26 Editorial.

On May 28 numbers dropped drastically when only 3,000 students took to the streets. A similar number of people would march again, this time with wreaths and banners, when they heard the news about the June 4 crackdown in Beijing.

== Protests in East China ==
=== Jiangsu ===
The largest protests in Jiangsu occurred in the provincial capital, Nanjing. Demonstrations and other actions also took place to varying degrees in Xuzhou, Changzhou, Wuxi, Suzhou, Yangzhou, Zhenjiang and other cities.

==== Nanjing南京 ====
April 17, 1989, saw a petition to the police from roughly 10,000 students from different campuses across Nanjing for permission to march in mourning of Hu Yaobang’s death. The police response was to ask students not to protest citing difficulty in maintaining public order. Although the students acquiesced to this, the Public Security Department still expected demonstrations to occur.

By April 20 students began blocking traffic and espousing radical ideas unrelated to Hu's death. The Jiangsu Party Committee filed a series of reports mentioning the students moving to the Bell Tower Square and demanding that their movement be recognized as patriotic and that officials do something about corruption and government transparency.

People began demonstrating in larger crowds after the release of the April 26 Editorial. By May 19 over 10,000 protesters were marching in the streets of Nanjing. Two days later workers from the nearby Nanjing Rubber Plant announced a strike, and journalists and teachers joined the protesting students.

Nanjing saw over 30,000 demonstrators turn out on May 28 whose targets were Deng Xiaoping and Premier Li Peng.

=== Zhejiang ===
The largest demonstrations in Zhejiang occurred in the provincial capital, Hangzhou. Protests also took place to varying degrees in Wenzhou, Jinhua, Lishui, Ningbo, Jiaxing, Taizhou, Linhai and elsewhere. Some prominent participants had previously taken part in the 1986 Chinese student demonstrations, while others later participated in the establishment of the Zhejiang branch of the Democracy Party of China.

==== Hangzhou杭州 ====
Protests in Hangzhou were sporadic until April 27, 1989, the day after the April 26 editorial. Another large reaction by Hangzhou students to the central government was after the Yuan Mu dialogue of April 29.

May 4 saw even larger student demonstrations when around 10,000 students marched demanding liberalization of the press, controls on inflation, and the removal of corrupt officials. At the same time, Party members in Hangzhou were explicitly told not to fraternize with the students, including the offering of any food or water like other Hangzhou citizens.

Demonstrations started again on May 14 with 2,000 people also marching through to May 16 and another 40 beginning a hunger strike in solidarity with students in Beijing. By the evening of May 17 the number of hunger strikers grew to several hundred.

On May 18, officials including Party Committee Secretary Li Zemin (not to be confused with Jiang Zemin) and Governor Shen Zulun visited the hunger strikers and implored them to end their fast. The China Daily was reported to have said that around 100,000 people either participated in, or watched, the demonstrations.

Partially in response to the declaration of martial law in Beijing, and lack of local government action, workers began striking on May 23 and demonstrated alongside students. The same day also saw 300 students renounced their membership from the Communist Youth League by destroying their membership cards. On May 26, some city newspapers ran urgent pleas from the government for students to return to classes, but 5,000 students still went to Wulin Square and announced that they would demonstrate until the very end.

By May 27, however, most students went back to classes, with the only notable exception of many from Hangzhou University. Li Zemin would demand on June 1 that the boycotts by the students end.

Reports from Hangzhou suggest that the ordinary protests changed with the June 4 Beijing crackdown. Trains and traffic were said to have been intermittently halted due to resulting protests.

=== Fujian ===
Large-scale protests in Fujian were concentrated in the provincial capital, Fuzhou, and in Xiamen. Quanzhou, Zhangzhou, Nanping and other cities also experienced demonstrations to varying degrees. Xi Jinping, then secretary of the CCP committee of Ningde Prefecture, was also involved in the local authorities' response to student demonstrations.

==== Fuzhou福州 ====
On May 4 several thousand students marched through Fuzhou. The marchers carried few banners, but were heard to be chanting anti-corruption and pro-China chants. The marchers, students from Fujian Teacher's University and Fuzhou University, went to the Provincial Party Headquarters. Once there, they found the building closed off and surround by police. Although there were some brief moments of pushing back and forth between the crowd and police, most of the crowd left after a few hours without incident.

From May 16 to May 18 the demonstrations in Fuzhou increased in sizes to over 10,000 but remained peaceful.

By May 20, with the declaration of martial law in Beijing, those students in Fuzhou who were especially upset with the Central Government blocked an express train to Beijing. This crowd of approximately 1,000 also demanded to see provincial Vice-governor Chen Mingyi, but after five hours of waiting they dispersed. On May 27, a group of protesters reportedly blocked a bridge that spans the Min River for roughly one hour.

In reaction to the military crackdown in Beijing on June 4, people marched in the thousands towards Fuzhou city centre. The next day marchers became more organized with elaborate banners expressing grief.

=== Shandong ===
The largest protests in Shandong occurred in the provincial capital, Jinan, and the major city of Qingdao. Yantai, Dongying, Tai'an, Binzhou, Jining, Liaocheng, Qufu and other cities also saw demonstrations to varying degrees.

==== Jinan济南 ====
One of the earliest demonstrations reported from Jinan, which happened on April 27, 1989, was due to the April 26 Editorial. By at least May 18 thousands were marching in Jinan in support of the Beijing students and demonstrated about problems in their own province.

On May 24 for the first time in the city roughly 1,000 workers went on strike. A day later an estimated 10,000 students, workers, and citizens marched. May 25, also saw students try to force their way onto trains that were now off limits to them.

On June 4 over 4,000 students marched in Jinan holding wreaths and mourned for the deaths in Beijing. Reportedly, they painted anti-Li Peng slogans on public transport vehicles like buses.

=== Anhui ===
The largest demonstrations in Anhui occurred in the provincial capital, Hefei, particularly at the University of Science and Technology of China, one of the centers of the 1986 Chinese student demonstrations. Bengbu, Anqing, Ma'anshan, Tongling, Wuhu, Huaibei, Fuyang and other cities also saw protests to varying degrees.

==== Hefei合肥 ====
Some of the earliest student demonstrations to have occurred in Hefei started on the evening of April 25, 1989, with the broadcasting of the April 26 Editorial. By April 27 the demonstrations started to pick up momentum with large crowds participating.

On May 17 over 10,000 students, teachers, and writers started marching demanding internal government reform. Students from the Chinese University of Science and Technology, who had participated in the 1986 protests, also joined in saying they would be silenced no longer.

Roughly 3,000 students and 400 workers and demobilized soldiers demonstrated during a Great Chinese Protest Day demonstration on May 28. Four days later on June 1 another 1,500 students would march in a show of solidarity with students in Shanghai. On the same day another 300 would pay homage to a student who died by falling under a train on his way back from Tiananmen Square.

=== Jiangxi ===
The largest protests in Jiangxi occurred in the provincial capital, Nanchang. Demonstrations also occurred in Pingxiang, Ganzhou, Fuzhou and elsewhere. Some participants in Nanchang established the "Nanchang Solidarity Trade Union", modeled on Poland's Solidarity movement; the organization was later banned by the authorities.

==== Nanchang南昌 ====
While most other cities were in a lull during the student movements, Nanchang students continued demonstrating into May 3, 1989. Over 10,000 students would march again on May 19.

Around 2,000 students would march after they heard about the June 4 crackdown in Beijing. They carried banners and chanted slogans on subjects about revenge and condemning Li Peng.

=== Shanghai ===
Demonstrations in Shanghai reached a peak of more than 300,000 participants. After the Shanghai-based newspaper World Economic Herald published coverage following Hu Yaobang's death, Jiang Zemin, then secretary of the Chinese Communist Party Shanghai Committee, took disciplinary action against the newspaper, contributing to demands for "freedom of the press".

Following the June Fourth crackdown, protests and unrest occurred near Shanghai railway station, and railway carriages were burned. Shanghai subsequently became the first city in China to execute participants in post-June Fourth unrest. Jiang Zemin was later promoted to General Secretary of the Chinese Communist Party, replacing Zhao Ziyang.

On April 17, 1989, small posters related to Hu Yaobang's death started to show up around Shanghai university campuses. During the next day several impromptu groups comprising thousands of students started to publicly mourn Hu. One group went so far as to demand to meet officials of the municipal government but ended up unsuccessful.

Until April 23 most student activity had been relatively lax, but after incident in which Qin Benli of the newspaper the World Economic Forum published unedited accounts from the leadership in Shanghai, students and journalists became more agitated.

Large protests in Shanghai occurred after the publication of the April 26 Editorial and would continue well through the Yuan Mu dialogue of April 29.

After having taken a break, on May 2 the students in Shanghai marched on towards the People's Square in crowds that roughly conjoined into one of roughly 7,000. While in the square the students conducted sit-ins, heard and made speeches, and signed petitions to the cities leadership. After police barred bystanders from entering the Square, the students then moved onto the Bund where their numbers swelled to about 8,000 and where they also conducted a sit-in that lasted into the late evening.

Two days later, on the seventieth anniversary of the May Fourth Movement, 8,000 Shanghai students again led a sit-in in front of the Municipal Government asking for dialogue. The pamphlets and handbills they circulated reportedly also garnered support from many citizens.

On May 16 over 4,000 students from 12 different universities went to the municipal government buildings and began a sit-in demanding the resignation of Jiang Zemin. They also continued with previous slogans and presented new demands to the government which included recognizing the student movement as patriotic, agree to not punish any demonstrators, to reinstate Qin Benli at the Herald, and for open dialogue between student representatives and the government on an equal footing. With the threat of even larger protests, the municipal leadership agreed to meet with student leaders the next day. By the morning May 17, with no dialogue having happened yet, 200 students remained at the sit-in and around 40 followed the students in Beijing's example and began their own hunger strike. Later that day, more than 23,000 protesters assembled outside of the government buildings, with an additional 60 hunger strikers. Dialogue between the students and government were boycotted by many because the student representatives were from official organizations and not the autonomous ones created by the students. Likewise, there was discontent when Jiang Zemin did not attend the dialogue and the following day would see over 100,000 citizens, including writers and workers, march in support of the students.

In response to the declaration of martial law in Beijing, more than 20,000 students, factory workers, and intellectuals marched in the rain to protest. Three days later on May 23 roughly 55,000 marched in Shanghai with non-students coming into university campuses and students going to workplaces to lecture.

Upon hearing the news of the June 4 crackdown in Beijing, Shanghai students protested in the streets and reportedly blocked off 42 areas. Throughout the day they put up roadblocks and shouted angry speeches.

== Protests in South Central China ==
=== Henan ===
During the movement, the largest demonstrations in Henan took place in major cities including the provincial capital, Zhengzhou, and Luoyang. Many protesters also travelled by train to Beijing to make contact with and support students there. Several weeks after the June Fourth crackdown, another demonstration took place in Kaifeng, which Chinese authorities subsequently characterized as a "counter-revolutionary incident".

=== Hunan ===
The largest demonstrations in Hunan occurred in the provincial capital, Changsha, while protesters in Xiangtan, Chenzhou, Shaoyang, Yiyang and other cities also participated. On 22 April, unrest in Changsha resulted in demonstrators entering the compound of the Hunan Provincial People's Government. After the June Fourth crackdown in Beijing, Hunan was among the provinces with the largest numbers of arrests connected to the 1989 movement.

==== Changsha长沙 ====
1998 protests in Changsha

During a student demonstration on April 22, 1989, disorder occurred in Changsha when roughly 20 shops were looted resulting in the detention of 96 people. April 24 saw students putting up posters with anti-Deng Xiaoping slogans around universities in the city, including Hunan Normal University. A day later on April 25 the police arrested 138 people for violence including “beating, smashing, and robbing.” Later that night, with the broadcasting of the April 26 Editorial, new demonstrations broke out that would grow larger by April 27.

Demonstrations continued in response to the poorly received Yuan Mu dialogue on April 29. By May 4, roughly 6,000 students in Changsha handed out letters to people asking for the support of farmers, workers, and entrepreneurs.

Hunger strikes in Changsha are reported to have started as early as May 13.

On May 19 students from Changsha University continued demonstrating and numbers from other colleges and high schools totaled the crowd between 20,000 and 30,000. Out of 300 students who were hunger striking, 26 fainted by midday and one student is reported to have tried committing suicide by banging his head against a wall.

June 1 also saw another 300 students go to the government building and commence a hunger strike. Around 500 students would march towards the train station on June 4 when they heard about the military crackdown in Beijing. That night they stopped locomotives from moving and placed wreaths mourning the students killed in Beijing around the station.

==== Shaoyang ====
Things remained relatively calm in Shaoyang during the early parts of the student demonstrations even though things were picking up in the provincial capital, Changsha. The first demonstrations in Shaoyang to have happened were due to the publication of the April 26 Editorial.

By May 19, 1989, more than 10,000 demonstrators and onlookers took to the cities square. Incidents of property damage reportedly occurred and some even tried to break into the municipal building by destroying windows and the front gate. About 45 were arrested with 12 immediately being let go. None of the vandals that participated were students.

=== Hubei ===
The largest protests in Hubei occurred in the provincial capital, Wuhan. Important transportation routes, including the Wuhan Yangtze River Bridge, were repeatedly blocked by demonstrators before and after the June Fourth crackdown. Student demonstrators also repeatedly attempted to establish links with workers at large industrial enterprises in Wuhan. Demonstrations also took place to varying degrees in Jingzhou, Huanggang, Xiaogan, Shiyan, Huangshi, Yichang and elsewhere.

==== Wuhan武汉 ====
1998 protests in Wuhan

Between April 19 and 22, 1989, reports started to come to the central government from the Hubei湖北 Party Committee describing that the student demonstrations occurring in the city were becoming increasingly political.

Major demonstrations began in Wuhan when the central government broadcast its April 26 Editorial. These demonstrations turned into protests on and off of Wuhan campuses after the broadcast of the Yuan Mu dialogue on April 29.

On May 4, an estimated 10,000 students marched and demanded inflation control and voiced their opposition to bureaucratic corruption in government. Likewise, on May 18, thousands continued to take to the streets.

After hearing the news of the crackdown in Beijing on June 4, more than 10,000 students from universities across the city marched. They blocked off the main roads between Wuhan, Wuchang, and Hanyang as well as blocked off the railroad tracks of the Beijing-Guangzhou line.

== Protests in Southwest China ==
=== Sichuan ===
In Sichuan, the largest demonstrations occurred in major cities including the provincial capital, Chengdu, and Chongqing. Panzhihua, Zigong, Dazhou, Xichang, Luzhou, Mianyang and other cities also saw demonstrations to varying degrees.

==== Chengdu成都 ====
Following the June Fourth crackdown, unrest and a violent crackdown occurred in Chengdu, resulting in hundreds of reported casualties. Accounts have described the casualties there as among the most severe outside Beijing. For the demonstrations in Chengdu see: Chengdu protests of 1989.

==== Chongqing重庆 ====
Some unrest began in Chongqing on university campuses after the news of Hu Yaobang's death was announced. Large outdoor demonstrations developed in Chongqing at least as early as the publication of the April 26 Editorial. These demonstrations would continue with the televised dialogue between Yuan Mu and the Beijing student leaders on April 29, 1989.

The May 4 demonstrations in Chongqing saw 7,000 people stage a sit-in at municipal government buildings asking for the government to acknowledge their movement as legitimate and also ask for fair treatment in the media. On the same day the organization between student protesters broke down as two non-students who had returned from Beijing with news were ousted as lay workers. Between May 17 and May 19, roughly 10,000 people demonstrated and at least 82 are thought to have started their own hunger strike. This would, however, started to fracture as tired students who flagged down rides back to campuses caused major traffic congestion and ordinary people began worrying about food shortages caused by the demonstrations.

From May 3 to May 20 fourteen people were reported by the Chongqing Ribao to have been arrested, although this number may be higher.

On May 20, city officials acceded to having a dialogue with demonstration leaders, but with factionalism and the hastiness of the meeting, nothing came of it. Over 20,000 demonstrators marched in the streets of Chongqing on May 23.

In response to the Beijing crackdown on June 4, many students in Chongqing started additional boycott class movements. People from all walks of life blocked roads, trains, and even overturned vehicles in the city. For two days the city was essentially paralyzed, although on the night of June 5 some officials were able to negotiate a dispersal of the protesters blocking the railways. Most traffic in the city would start to resume the following day.

=== Yunnan ===
The largest protests in Yunnan occurred in the provincial capital, Kunming. Zhaotong, Dali, Baoshan, Qujing, Yuxi, Pu'er, Xishuangbanna, Dehong and other areas also saw protests to varying degrees.

Provincial authorities alleged that democracy activists in Yunnan maintained contacts with authorities in Taiwan through routes including the China–Myanmar border during and after the movement, or attempted to stockpile weapons and ammunition. Some accounts also state that sympathizers with the student movement among People's Liberation Army units stationed in Yunnan attempted to organize a mutiny, which was ultimately suppressed. According to recollections by participants, some demands raised by protesters in Yunnan reflected local concerns, including calls for the authorities to review alleged shortcomings in policies concerning ethnic minorities and for greater local autonomy under the system of regional ethnic autonomy.

=== Guizhou ===
According to statistics compiled by the Guizhou provincial authorities, between late April and early June students from institutions of higher education and dozens of secondary specialized schools in nine prefectures, autonomous prefectures and cities participated in demonstrations.

The largest protests occurred in the provincial capital, Guiyang, while demonstrations also took place in Zunyi, Bijie, Xingyi, Kaili, Liupanshui, Duyun and elsewhere. After the June Fourth crackdown, Chinese public security authorities also claimed to have uncovered several "counter-revolutionary groups" in Guizhou accused of attempting to obtain firearms, ammunition and other weapons.

Guiyang贵阳 saw some of its major student protests happen on the early morning of May 18, 1989, when 3,000 saw some of their cohort off at the train headed for Beijing. Later, 2,000 of the students moved to the provincial government building chanting slogans and criticizing the province's lack of financial development. In the afternoon, after earlier being deterred by the police, roughly 4,500 students marched again outside the provincial building and demanded objective news coverage of their movement as well as transportation for those students who wished to go to Beijing. The government, reportedly at a loss as to what to do, ordered several thousand box dinners and decided to try and wait the students out. By the evening 2,000 students were still waiting with a police estimate of 100,000 onlookers as well.

Over 1,000 students in Guiyang would protest on June 4 after hearing about the crackdown in Beijing. They laid wreathes in the city square and some even called on people to riot against the government.

=== Tibet ===
Before the outbreak of the student movement in April 1989, Tibet had already experienced pro-independence protests and unrest in Lhasa in March 1989. As a result, Lhasa remained under martial law throughout the Tiananmen movement. Only a small number of university students reportedly participated in solidarity activities.

== Protests in South China ==
=== Guangdong ===
Large-scale protests in Guangdong were concentrated in Guangzhou and Shenzhen, while demonstrations also reached Zhuhai, Zhongshan, Shantou and other cities. Participants also included students from British Hong Kong and Portuguese Macau. The largest demonstration was the Guangdong–Hong Kong–Macau patriotic democratic march on 23 May, in which approximately 500,000 people participated.

Following the June Fourth crackdown, Guangdong became a principal route through which participants in the democracy movement escaped to Hong Kong and Macau as part of Operation Yellowbird. Military and government authorities in Guangdong subsequently strengthened border controls.

==== Guangzhou ====
1998 protests in Guangzhou

=== Guangxi ===
Large protests in the Guangxi Zhuang Autonomous Region took place in the regional capital, Nanning, as well as in Guilin and Liuzhou. Wuzhou, Yulin, Hechi, Yishan, Baise, Beihai, Qinzhou and other places also saw protests to varying degrees.

=== Hainan ===
Liang Xiang, then governor of Hainan, was regarded as a reformist aligned with Zhao Ziyang. Some accounts have claimed that protests on Hainan received support from Liang. Following the June Fourth crackdown, Liang and figures including Cheng Kai, editor-in-chief of the Hainan Daily, were subjected to political disciplinary measures in connection with their perceived sympathy for the movement.

== See also ==
- 1989 Tiananmen Square protests and massacre
- Memorials for the 1989 Tiananmen Square protests and massacre
- June Fourth Memorial Museum
- Criticism of the Chinese Communist Party
- 1989 Tiananmen Square protests in Hong Kong
- 1989 Tiananmen Square protests in Macau
- Reactions to the 1989 Tiananmen Square protests and massacre
  - Republic of China response to the 1989 Tiananmen Square protests and massacre
