= He Qigong =

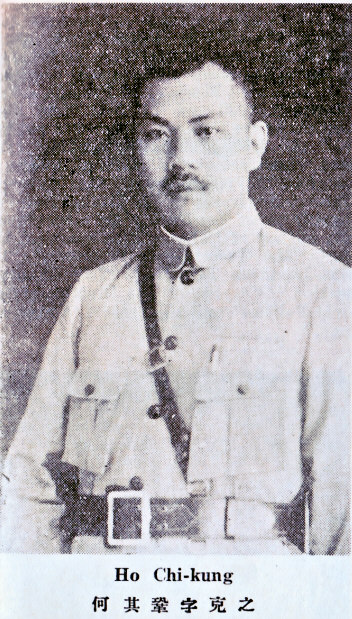

He Qigong (Chinese: 何其鞏) (1898–1955) was a Chinese educator and Kuomintang politician of the Republic of China. He was born in Anqing, Anhui. He was the 16th Republic-era mayor of Beijing (called Beiping during his tenure).

Preceded by He Chengjun	Mayor of Beijing; July 1928 – June 1929	Succeeded by Zhang Yinwu

== Bibliography ==
- Xu Youchun (徐友春) (main ed.) (2007). Unabridged Biographical Dictionary of the Republic, Revised and Enlarged Version (民国人物大辞典 增订版). Hebei People's Press (Hebei Renmin Chubanshe; 河北人民出版社). ISBN 978-7-202-03014-1.
- 劉国銘主編 (2005). 中国国民党百年人物全書. 団結出版社. ISBN 7-80214-039-0.
- 劉寿林ほか編 (1995). 民国職官年表. Zhonghua Book Company. ISBN 7-101-01320-1.
