= Wang Hu (China) =

Chinese politician (1865–1933)

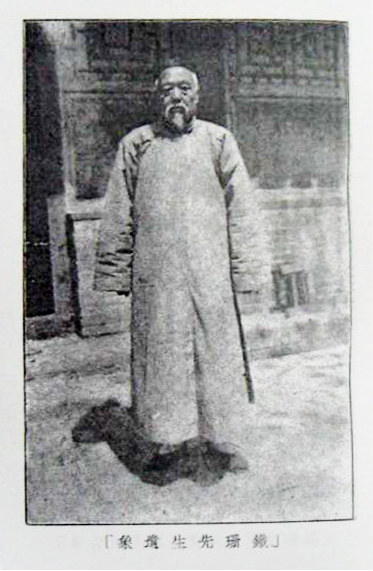

Wang Hu (Chinese: 王瑚); 1865 – April 25, 1933) was a politician of the Qing dynasty and the Republic of China.He was born in Baoding, Hebei. He was the 6th Republic-era mayor of Beijing. He was affiliated with the Zhili clique of the Beiyang government.

Preceded by Wang Da	Mayor of Beijing; August-September 1920	Succeeded by Sun Zhenjia

== Bibliography ==
- 徐友春主編 (2007). 民国人物大辞典 増訂版|和書. 河北人民出版社. ISBN 978-7-202-03014-1.
- 「王瑚」 華夏人物庫-現代人物（華夏経緯網）
- 劉寿林ほか編 (1995). 民国職官年表|和書. Zhonghua Book Company. ISBN 7-101-01320-1.
