= Wang Zhixiang =

Taiwanese politician (1858–1930)

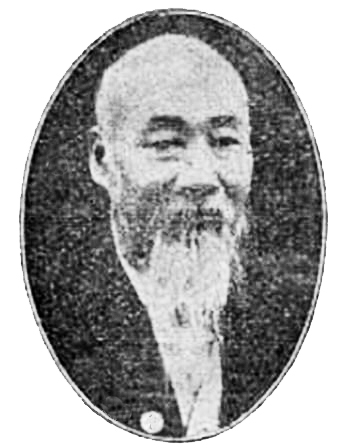

Wang Zhixiang (Chinese: 王芝祥); 1858–1930) was a politician of the Republic of China who was born in Beijing during the Qing dynasty and became its ninth Republican mayor.

== Bibliography ==
- 徐友春主編 (2007). 民国人物大辞典 増訂版|和書. 河北人民出版社. ISBN 978-7-202-03014-1.
- 劉寿林ほか編 (1995). 民国職官年表|和書. Zhonghua Book Company. ISBN 7-101-01320-1.

Preceded by Liu Menggeng	Mayor of Beijing; November–December 1924	Succeeded by Xue Dubi
