= Yuan Liang =

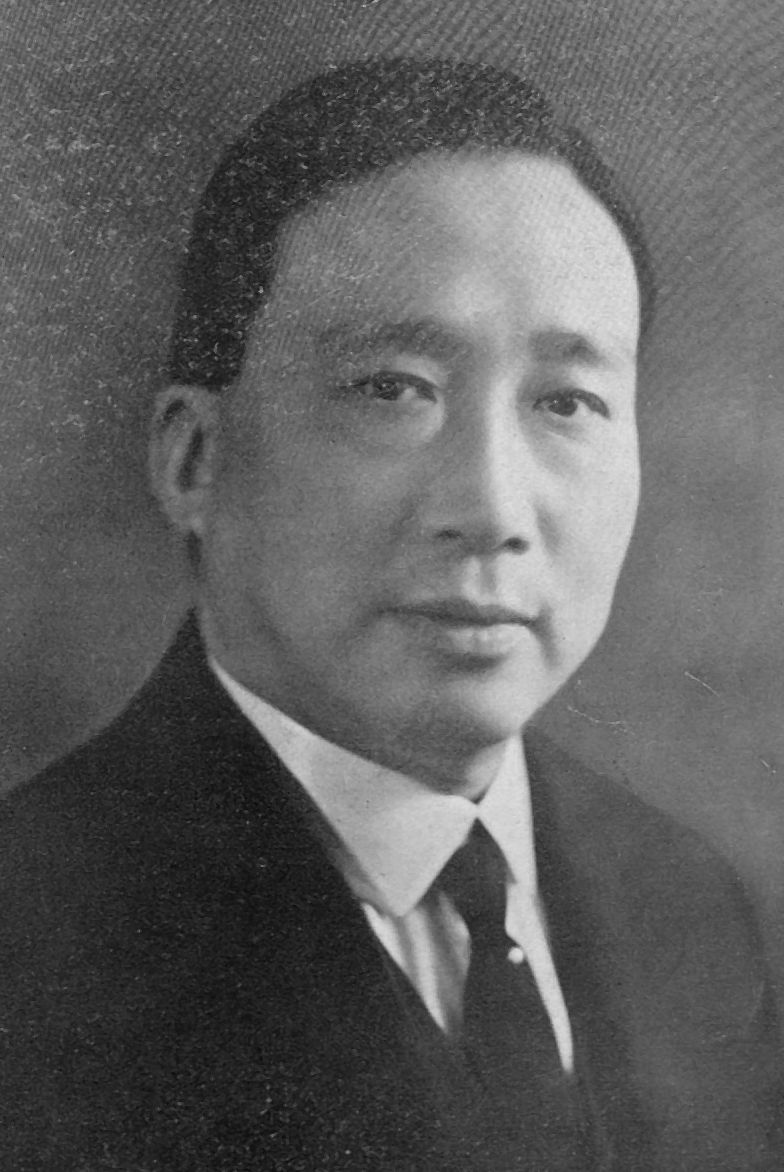

Yuan Liang (Chinese: 袁良) (1882–1953) was a Kuomintang politician of the Republic of China. He was born in Hangzhou, Zhejiang. He was the 21st mayor of Beijing.

Preceded by Hu Ruoyu (Anhui)	Mayor of Beijing; 1933–1935	Succeeded by Song Zheyuan

== Bibliography ==
- 徐友春主編 (2007). 民国人物大辞典 増訂版|和書. 河北人民出版社. ISBN 978-7-202-03014-1.
- 何立波「『華北自治運動』中的冀東偽政権」『二十一世紀』網絡版総第49期、2006年4月
- 中国近代紡績史編輯委員会編 (1997). 中国近代紡績史 下冊|和書. 中国紡績出版社. ISBN 7506413167.
- 「江西九江一市民将斯諾饋贈的槍支上交警方」 中国網、2001年6月26日
- 劉寿林ほか編 (1995). 民国職官年表|和書. Zhonghua Book Company. ISBN 7-101-01320-1.
