= Wang Jingwei regime =

Puppet state of Japan in China (1940–1945)

Coordinates: 32°03′N 118°46′E

Republic of China 中華民國
- 1940–1945
- Top: 1940–1943 version of the flag Bottom: 1943–1945 version of the flag National Emblem
- Motto: 和平、反共、建國; Hépíng, Fǎngòng, Jiànguó "Peace, Anti-Communism, National Construction"
- Anthem: 中華民國國歌, Zhōnghuá Mínguó Guógē "National Anthem of the Republic of China" ---- March of East Asian Nations
- The Wang Jingwei regime (dark red) and Mengjiang (light red) within the Empire of Japan (pink) at its furthest extent
- Status: Rival of the National Government and puppet government of the Empire of Japan within the Japanese occupied parts of Republic of China
- Capital: Nanjing
- Largest city: Shanghai
- Official languages: Standard Chinese; Japanese
- Government: Unitary presidential republic under a one-party totalitarian dictatorship
- President
  - 1940–1944: Wang Jingwei
  - 1944–1945: Chen Gongbo
- Vice President
  - 1940–1945: Zhou Fohai
- Historical era: World War II
  - Established: 30 March 1940
  - Recognized by Japan: 20 November 1940
  - Dissolved: 16 August 1945
Preceded by
Reformed Government of the Republic of China
Provisional Government of the Republic of China
Mengjiang United Autonomous Government
Succeeded by
Republic of China
Soviet occupation of Manchuria
- Today part of: China

Reorganised National Government of the Republic of China

Wang Jingwei regime
- Traditional Chinese: 汪精衛政府
- Simplified Chinese: 汪精卫政府
Transcriptions
Standard Mandarin
- Hanyu Pinyin: Wāngjīngweì zhèngfǔ
- Bopomofo: ㄨㄤㄐㄧㄥㄨㄟˋ ㄓㄥˋㄈㄨˇ
- Gwoyeu Romatzyh: Uangjingwey jenqfuu
- Wade–Giles: Wang1-ching1-wei4 cheng4-fu3

The Reorganized National Government of the Republic of China (RNG), (Note: Chinese: 中華民國國民政府; pinyin: Zhōnghuá Mínguó Guómín Zhèngfǔ) commonly known as the Wang Jingwei regime, was a collaborationist government with the Empire of Japan that administered Japanese-occupied China during the Second Sino-Japanese War.

In late 1938, Wang Jingwei, then second in the leadership of the Republic of China (ROC) after Chiang Kai-shek, departed the wartime capital Chongqing for Hanoi to call for a negotiated peace with Japan. Following his expulsion from the Kuomintang and a failed assassination attempt ordered by Chiang, Wang established the RNG in occupied Nanjing in 1940, with a collaborationist Kuomintang as its ruling party. A deliberate carbon copy of the ROC government, the RNG claimed sovereignty over all of China except the Japanese puppet state of Manchukuo, presenting itself as the legitimate Chinese government in opposition to Chiang's administration in Chongqing. Its diplomatic recognition was limited to fellow signatories of the Anti-Comintern Pact.

The RNG absorbed the Reformed Government (1938–1940) and the Provisional Government (1937–1940) that had administered occupied central and northern China respectively. Unlike the RNG, these predecessors functioned largely as instruments of the Japanese military and received no recognition from Japan or its allies. The former territory of the Provisional Government nevertheless retained semi-autonomous status as the North China Political Council, while the region of Mengjiang remained only nominally under RNG authority. Following Wang's death in November 1944, Chen Gongbo succeeded him as head of government. After Japan's surrender in August 1945, the RNG dissolved; many of its leading members were tried and executed for treason.

== Names ==
As both the Republic of China and the People's Republic of China regard the RNG as illegitimate, the regime is commonly qualified with the modifier Wei (simplified Chinese: 伪; traditional Chinese: 偽; pinyin: Wěi; lit. 'pseudo', 'illegal') in Chinese, such as Wang Wei Zhengquan (simplified Chinese: 汪伪政权; traditional Chinese: 汪偽政權; pinyin: Wāng Wěi Zhèngquán; lit. 'Wang's illegitimate regime') or Wei Guomin Zhengfu (simplified Chinese: 伪国民政府; traditional Chinese: 偽國民政府; pinyin: Wěi Guómín Zhèngfǔ; lit. 'Illegitimate Nationalist Government').

== Background and establishment ==
While Wang Jingwei was widely regarded as a favorite to inherit Sun Yat-sen's position as leader of the Nationalist Party, especially given his unique position as the drafter of Sun's political testament, he was rapidly overtaken by Chiang Kai-shek in the Canton Coup. After a series of power struggles, they reconciled following the Mukden Incident, with Wang taking the position of Premier and then also Foreign Minister for the Nationalist Government under Chiang Kai-shek. This put him in control over the deteriorating Sino-Japanese relationship.

While initially advocating resistance alongside negotiations, Wang increasingly favored the peace movement following China's defeat at the First Battle of Hopei, citing Japan's overwhelming military superiority. After the Trautmann mediation collapsed, Wang conducted secret negotiations with Japan in 1938. Japan conditionally agreed to withdraw its troops within two years and support Wang in establishing a rival government to Chiang's. Wang's original plan was to base this government in the unoccupied southwest, relying on anti-Chiang warlords such as Long Yun and Zhang Fakui.

In December 1938, Wang, then the second-ranking KMT leader after Chiang, left China's wartime capital Chongqing for Hanoi, where he publicly called for a peace settlement with Japan and was subsequently expelled from the KMT. The warlords on whom Wang had counted to rally behind his peace movement failed to respond, and after Chiang dispatched assassins who killed Wang's secretary Zeng Zhongming in Hanoi instead, Wang was escorted by the Japanese to Shanghai.

In June 1939, Wang and his supporters began negotiating with the Japanese for the creation of a new Nationalist Government. To this end, Wang sought to discredit the Nationalists in Chongqing on the basis that they represented not the republican government envisioned by Sun, but rather a "one-party dictatorship". In August, Wang secretly convened the 6th National Congress of the KMT in Shanghai, effectively creating a new collaborationist Kuomintang with Wang as its leaders.

Wang and his allies suffered an early setback in January 1940 when diplomat Gao Zongwu, who had played a key role in Wang's negotiations with the Japanese, defected to Chongqing. Disillusioned with Japan, Gao took with him documents relating to the treaty between Japan and the Wang regime and leaked them to the press. The revelations proved a major propaganda victory for Chiang Kai-shek, reinforcing public perceptions that Wang's government was a Japanese puppet.

On 30 March 1940, the RNG was established in Nanjing.

== History ==
=== Shanghai as de facto capital, 1939–1941 ===
With Nanjing still rebuilding itself after the devastating assault and occupation by the Japanese Imperial Army, the fledgling Reorganized Nationalist Government turned to Shanghai as its primary focal point. With its key role as both an economic and media center for all China, close affiliation to Western Imperial powers even despite the Japanese invasion, and relatively sheltered position from attacks by KMT and Communist forces alike, Shanghai offered both sanctuary and opportunity for Wang and his allies' ambitions. Once in Shanghai, the new regime quickly moved to take control over those publications already supportive of Wang and his peace platform, while also engaging in violent, gang-style attacks against rival news outlets. By November 1940, the Reorganized Nationalist Party had secured enough local support to begin hostile takeovers of both Chinese courts and banks still under nominal control by the KMT in Chongqing or Western powers. Buoyed by this rapid influx of seized collateral, the Reorganized Government under its recently appointed Finance Minister, Zhou Fohai, was able to issue a new currency for circulation. Ultimately however, the already limited economic influence garnered by the new banknotes was further diminished by Japanese efforts to contain the influence of the new regime, at least for a time, to territories firmly under Japanese control like Shanghai and other isolated regions of the Yangtze Valley.

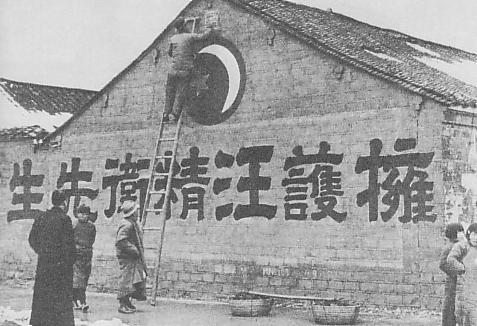
Wall bearing a government slogan that proclaims: "Support Mr. Wang Jingwei!"

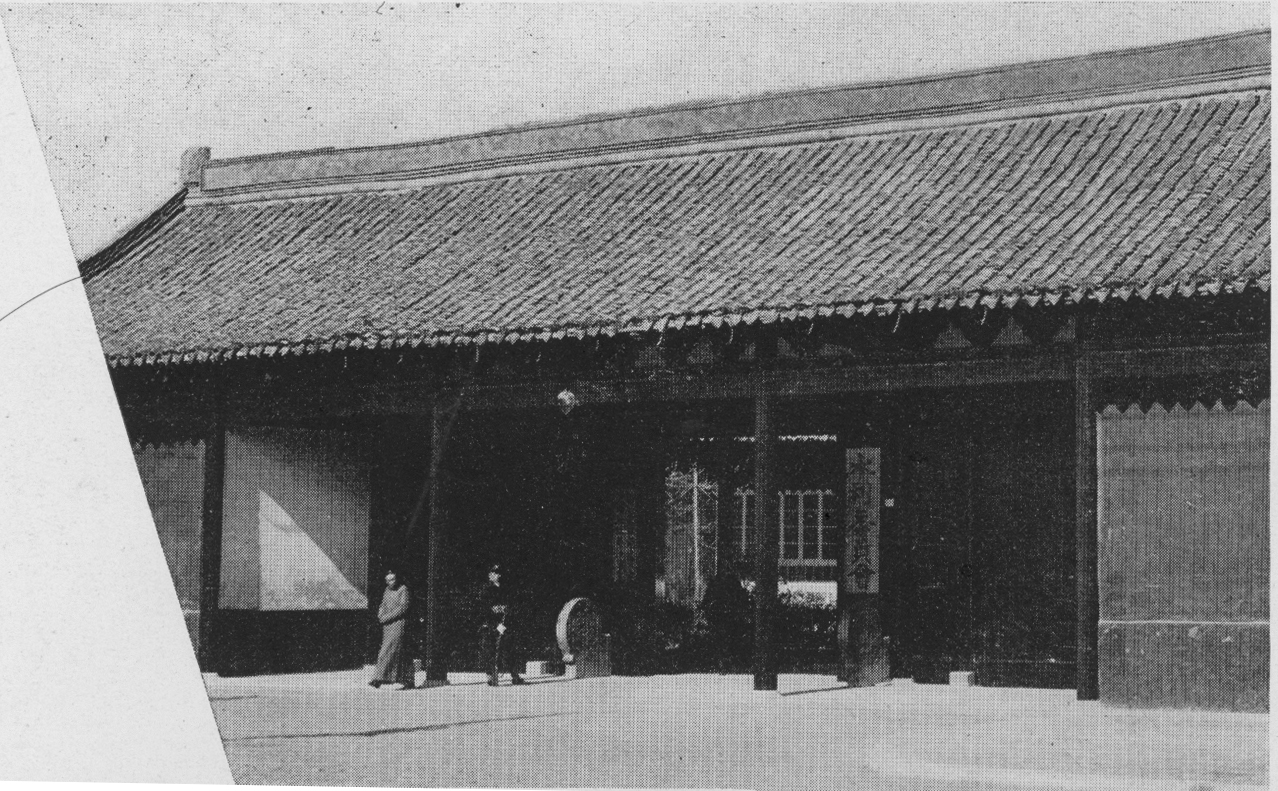
Water Resource Committee of Wang Jingwei's puppet government

=== Efforts to expand Japanese recognition ===
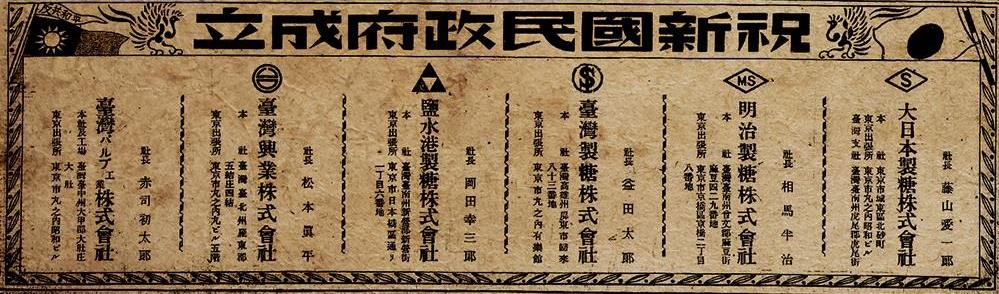
Advertisement of congratulation towards the establishment of the new Nationalist government on Taiwan Nichi Nichi Shimpō

While Wang had been successful in securing from Japan a "basic treaty" recognizing the foundation of his new party in November 1940, the produced document granted the Reorganized Nationalist Government almost no powers whatsoever. This initial treaty precluded any possibility for Wang to act as intermediary with Chiang Kai-shek and his forces in securing a peace agreement in China. Likewise, the regime was afforded no extra administrative powers in occupied China, save those few previously carved out in Shanghai. Indeed, official Japanese correspondence regarded the RNG as trivially important, and urged any and all token representatives stationed with Wang and his allies to dismiss all diplomatic efforts by the new government which could not directly contribute to a total military victory over Chiang and his forces. Hoping to expand the treaty in such a way as to be useful, Wang formally traveled to Tokyo in June 1941 in order to meet with prime minister Fumimaro Konoe and his cabinet to discuss new terms and agreements. Unfortunately for Wang, his visit coincided with the Nazi invasion of the Soviet Union, a move which further emboldened officials in Tokyo to pursue total victory in China, rather than accept a peace deal. In the end, Konoe eventually agreed to provide a substantial loan to the RNG as well as increased sovereignty; neither of which came to fruition, and indeed, neither of which were even mentioned to military commanders stationed in China. As a slight conciliation, Wang was successful in persuading the Japanese to secure official recognition for the RNG from the other Axis Powers.

=== Breakthrough, 1943 ===
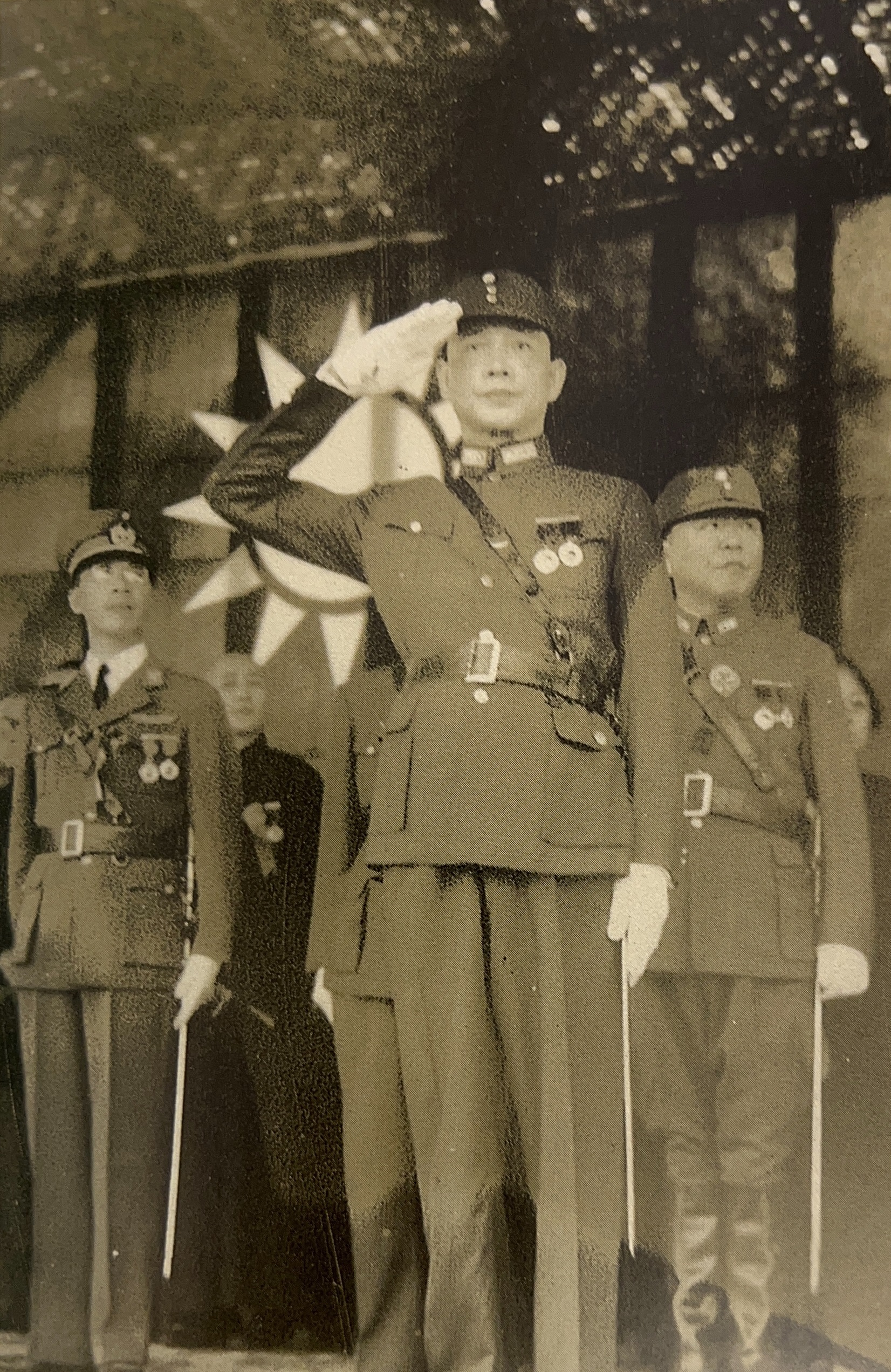
Wang Jingwei at a military parade

As the Japanese offensive stalled around the Pacific, conditions remained generally consistent under Wang Jingwei's government. The regime continued to represent itself as the legitimate government of China, continued to appeal to Chiang Kai-shek to seek a peace deal, and continued to chafe under the extremely limited sovereignty afforded by the Japanese occupiers. Yet by 1943, Japanese leaders including Hideki Tojo, recognizing that the tide of war was turning against them, sought new ways to reinforce the thinly stretched Japanese forces. To this end, Tokyo finally found it expedient to fully recognize Wang Jingwei's government as a full ally, and a replacement Pact of Alliance was drafted for the basic treaty. This new agreement granted the RNG markedly enhanced administrative control over its own territory, as well as increased ability to make limited self-decisions. Despite this windfall, the deal came far too late for the Reorganized government to have sufficient resources to take advantage of its new powers, and Japan was in no condition to offer aid to its new partner.

=== War on opium ===
As a result of general chaos and wartime various profiteering efforts of the conquering Japanese armies, already considerable illegal opium smuggling operations expanded greatly in the Reorganized Nation Government's territory. Indeed, Japanese forces themselves became arguably the largest and most widespread traffickers within the territory under the auspices of semi-official narcotics monopolies. While initially too politically weak to make inroads into the Japanese operations, as the war began to turn against them, the Japanese government sought to incorporate some collaborationist governments more actively into the war effort. To this end in October 1943 the Japanese government signed a treaty with the Reorganized Nationalist Government of China offering them a greater degree of control over their own territory. As a result, Wang Jingwei and his government were able to gain some increased control over the opium monopolies. Negotiations by Chen Gongbo were successful in reaching an agreement to cut opium imports from Mongolia in half, as well as an official turnover of state-sponsored monopolies from Japan over to the Reorganized Nationalist Government. Yet, perhaps due to financial concerns, the regime sought only limited reductions in the distribution of opium throughout the remainder of the war.

=== The northern Chinese areas ===
Area of control of the invading Japanese forces

The Tongzhou administration (East Ji Anti-Communist Autonomous Administration) was under the commander-in-chief of the Japanese Northern China Area Army until the Yellow River area fell inside the sphere of influence of the Japanese Central China Area Army. During this same period the area from middle Zhejiang to Guangdong was administered by the Japanese North China Area Army. These small, largely independent fiefdoms had local money and local leaders, and frequently squabbled.

Wang Jingwei traveled to Tokyo in 1941 for meetings. In Tokyo the RNG Vice President Zhou Fohai commented to the Asahi Shimbun newspaper that the Japanese establishment was making little progress in the Nanjing area. This quote provoked anger from Kumataro Honda, the Japanese ambassador in Nanjing. Zhou Fohai petitioned for total control of China's central provinces by the RNG. In response, Imperial Japanese Army Lt. Gen. Teiichi Suzuki was ordered to provide military guidance to the RNG, and so became part of the real power that lay behind Wang's rule.

With the permission of the Japanese Army, a monopolistic economic policy was applied, to the benefit of Japanese zaibatsu and local representatives. Though these companies were supposedly treated the same as local Chinese companies by the government, the president of the Yuan legislature in Nanjing, Chen Gongbo, complained that this was untrue to the Kaizō Japanese review. The RNG set up an embassy in Yokohama, Japan (as did Manchukuo).

=== Anti-Japanese double agents ===
Some Chinese collaborators were in fact anti-Japanese double agents helped rescue downed American airmen from Japanese. The double agent warlords Sun Dianying and Pang Bingxun in Henan, who were officially part of Wang Jingwei's collaborationist army, helped rescue downed American airmen who were bombing the Japanese and they gave intelligence on Japanese troops movements. Sun Dianying hosted American OSS agents like Team Jackal under Major Paul Cyr and Chinese guerillas carrying out sabotage attacks and guerilla attacks against Japanese, in his base in Xinxiang, Henan under the nose of the Japanese. They parachuted into his base area safely to attack Japanese behind the front lines.

American medical missionary Walter H. Judd said in testimony before US Congress on 25 April 1939, that not even one-hundredth of 1 percent of the Chinese people supported Japan, and that many Chinese "puppet" collaborators were in fact double agents against Japan, with him personally knowing a "puppet" magistrate in and occupied city who gave 30% of the taxes he collected to anti-Japanese guerilla fighters and he said he only did not personally join the guerrilla war and stayed behind to pretend to collaborate, because he was too old to fight.

Judd also said that Japan didn't control huge swaths of areas they were nominally marked as Japanese occupied on maps, saying "there is no place that they control more than 10 miles, and most places not more than 2 miles, outside the cities and the lines of communication." and "You can rightly say that the Japanese Army is still in a state of siege in the areas in China." A Japanese soldier admitted that "Japanese occupied territory was only a few dots and lines."

Medical corps Private First Class in the Imperial Guard first regiment, Yoshiro Yamazaki admitted Japan only controlled "points and lines" in the "occupied" areas in north-central China.

== Government and politics ==
Wang Jingwei nominally ruled the government as the Chairman of the Central Political Committee, Chairman of the National Government Committee, and President of the Executive Yuan (commonly called the Premier), until his death in 1944, after which Chen Gongbo succeeded him until Japan's defeat in 1945. His collaborationist Kuomintang was the sole-ruling party. The supreme national ruling body was officially the Central Political Committee, under which was the National Government Committee. The administrative structure of the RNG also included a Legislative Yuan and an Executive Yuan; they were respectively led by Chen Gongbo and Wang Jingwei until 1944. However, actual political power remained with the commander of the Japanese Central China Area Army and Japanese political entities formed by Japanese political advisors. A principal goal of the new regime was to portray itself as the legitimate continuation of the former Nationalist government, despite the Japanese occupation. To this end, the Reorganized government frequently sought to revitalize and expand the former policies of the Nationalist government, often to mixed success.

=== Senior officeholders ===
==== Central Political Committee ====
- Chairman
  - Wang Jingwei (March 1940 – November 1944)
  - Chen Gongbo (November 1944 – August 1945)

==== National Government Committee ====
- Chairman
  - Wang Jingwei (March 1940 – November 1944)
  - Chen Gongbo (November 1944 – August 1945)

==== Executive Yuan ====
- Premier
  - Wang Jingwei (March 1940 – November 1944)
  - Chen Gongbo (November 1944 – August 1945)
- Vice Premier
  - Chu Minyi (September–December 1940)
  - Zhou Fohai (December 1940 – August 1945)
- Minister of the Interior – Chen Qun
- Minister of Foreign Affairs – Chu Minyi
- Minister of Finance – Zhou Fohai
- Acting Minister of Military Administration – Bao Wenyue
- Minister of the Navy – Wang Jingwei, Acting by Ren Yuandao
- Minister of Education – Zhao Zhengping (independent)
- Minister of Judicial Administration – Li Shengwu
- Minister of Industry and Commerce – Mei Siping
- Minister of Agriculture and Mining – Zhao Yusong (Young China Party)
- Minister of Railways – Fu Shishuo (independent)
- Minister of Communications – Zhu Xiang (State Socialist Party)
- Minister of Social Affairs – Ding Mocun
- Minister of Propaganda – Lin Bosheng
- Minister of Police – Zhou Fohai (abolished on 16 August 1941)
- Reconstruction Commission – Cen Deguang
- Frontier Affairs Commission – Luo Junqiang
- Overseas Chinese Affairs Commission – Chen Jicheng
- Water Resources Commission – Yang Shoumei

==== Legislative Yuan ====
- President
  - Chen Gongbo (March 1940 – November 1944)
  - Liang Hongzhi (November 1944 – August 1945)
- Vice Presidents
  - Zhu Lühé (September 1940 – February 1941, concurrent)
  - Miao Bin (February 1941 – August 1942)
  - Zhu Xiang (August 1942 – August 1945)

==== Judicial Yuan ====
- President – Wen Zongyao (March 1940 – August 1945)
- Vice President – Zhu Lühé (March 1940 – April 1945)
- President of Supreme Court – Zhang Tao
- President of Administrative Court – Lin Biao (born 1889)
- Chairman of Commission on the Discipline of Civil Servants – Zhu Lühé

==== Examination Yuan ====
- President
  - Wang Yitang (March 1940 – March 1942)
  - Jiang Kanghu (March 1942 – November 1944)
  - Chen Qun (November 1944 – August 1945)
- Vice Presidents
  - Jiang Kanghu (March 1940 – March 1942)
  - Jiao Ying (March 1942 – August 1945)
- Minister of Civil Service – Jiang Kanghu
- Chairman of Examination Commission – Jiao Ying

==== Control Yuan ====
- President
  - Liang Hongzhi (March 1940 – November 1944)
  - Gu Zhongchen (November 1944 – July 1945)
- Vice Presidents
  - Gu Zhongchen (March 1940 – November 1944)
  - Xia Qifeng (November 1944 – August 1945)
- Minister of Audit – Xia Qifeng

==== Military Affairs Commission ====
- Chairman – Chen Gongbo (from 1941)
- General Staff – Yang Kuiyi
- President of Military Advisory Council – Ren Yuandao
- Minister of Training Department – Xiao Shuxuan
- Minister of Political Training Department – Chen Gongbo
- Minister of Investigation and Statistics Department – Li Shiqun (16 August 1941 – 9 September 1943)
- Deputy Minister – Yang Jie
- Permanent Deputy Minister – Xia Zhongming
- Minister of Political Department – Huang Ziqiang (from 9 September 1943)

=== International recognition and foreign relations ===
Wang Jingwei, Japanese ambassador Nobuyuki Abe, and Manchukuo ambassador Zang Shiyi sign the joint declaration, 30 November 1940

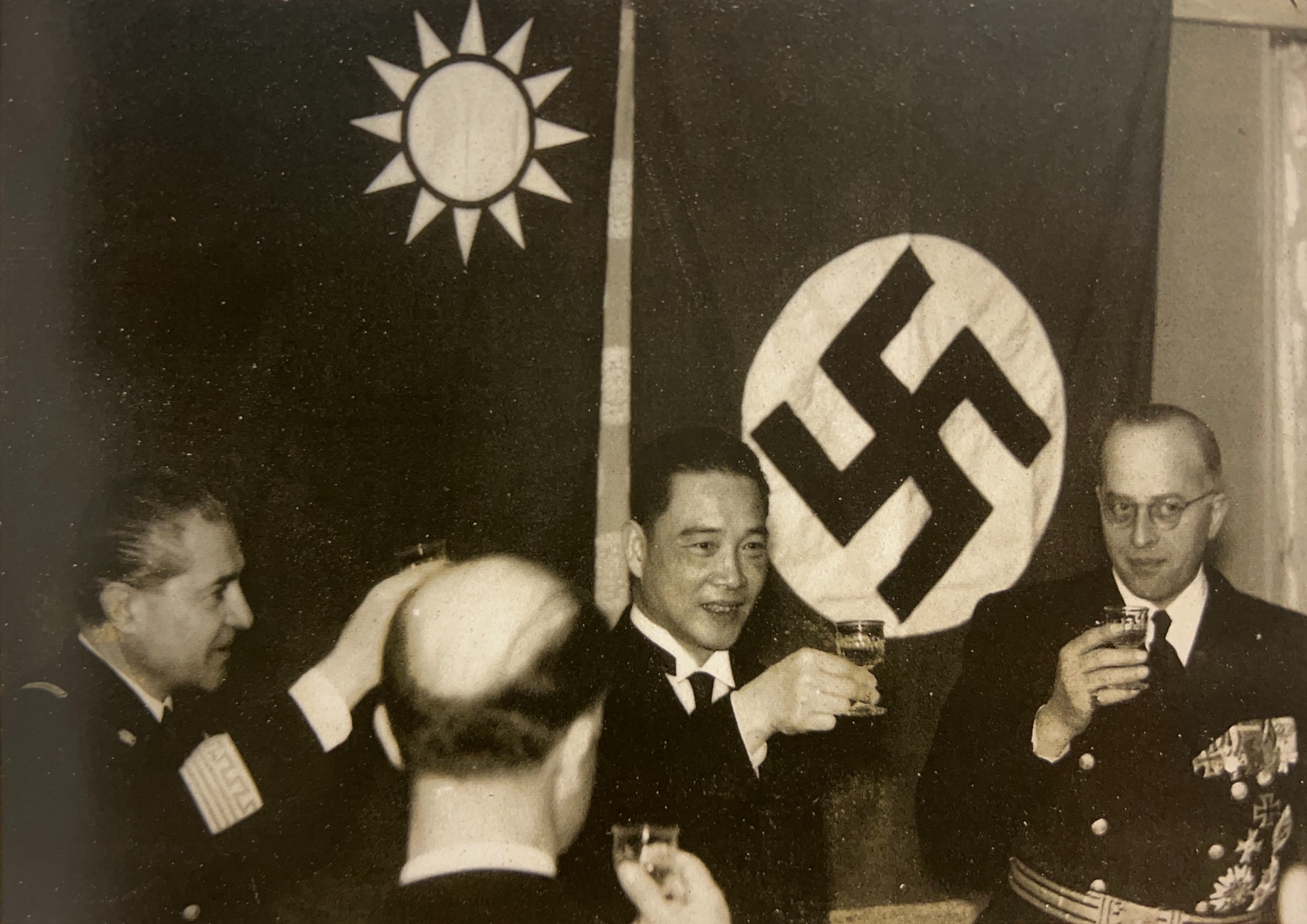
Wang Jingwei with ambassador Heinrich Georg Stahmer at the German embassy in 1941

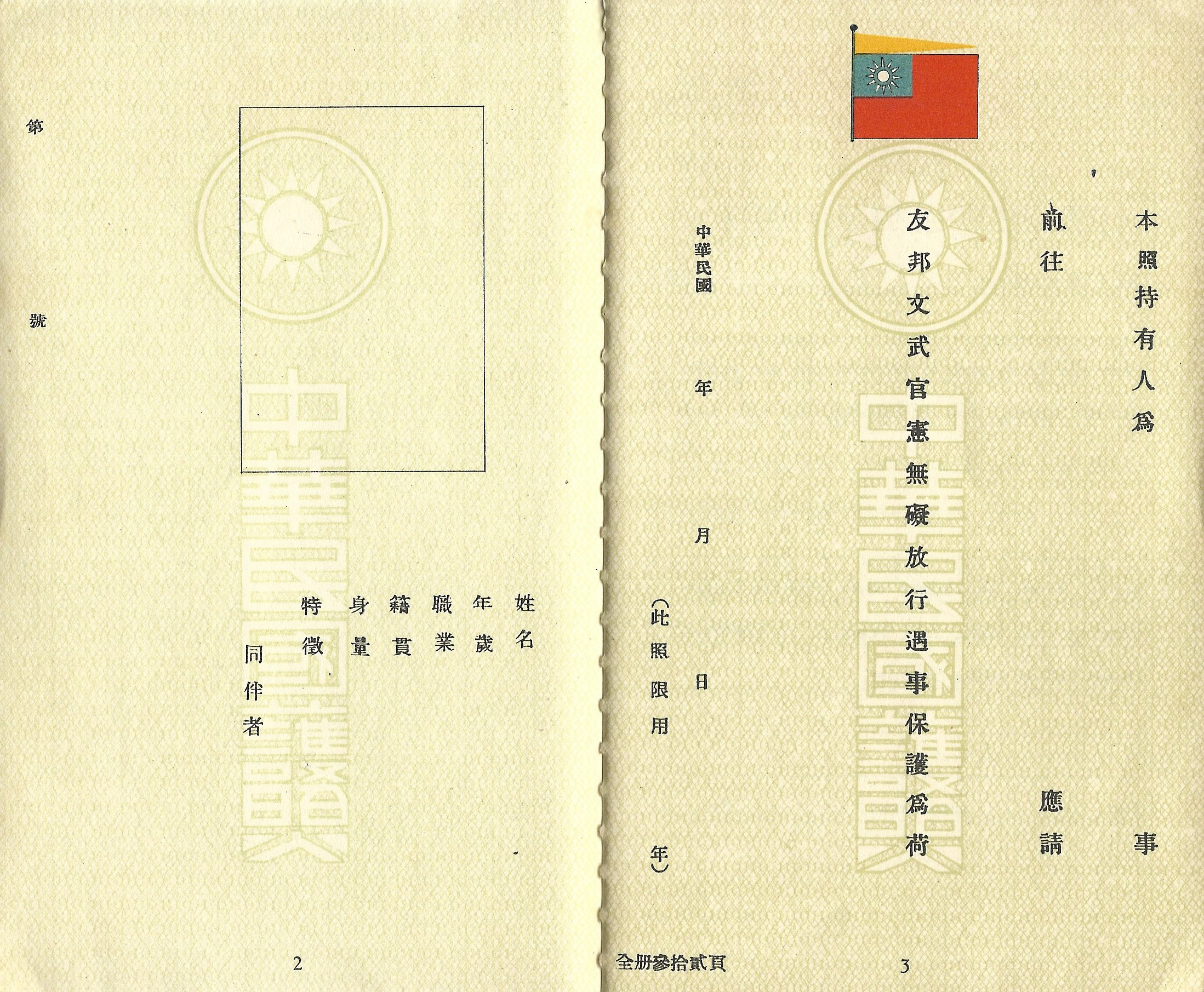
Unused example of a Wang Jingwei regime passport, circa 1941

The RNG received limited international recognition as it was seen as a Japanese puppet state, being recognized by Japan and the rest of the Axis powers. Initially, its main sponsor, Japan, hoped to come to a peace accord with Chiang Kai-shek and held off official diplomatic recognition for the RNG for eight months after its founding, not establishing formal diplomatic relations with the RNG until 30 November 1940. The Sino-Japanese Basic Treaty was signed on 20 November 1940, by which Japan recognised the Nationalist Government, and it also included a Japan–Manchukuo–China joint declaration by which China recognized Manchukuo and the three countries pledged to create a "New Order in East Asia." The United States and Britain immediately denounced the formation of the government, seeing it as a tool of Japanese imperialism. In July 1941, after negotiations by Foreign Minister Chu Minyi, the RNG was recognized as the government of China by Germany and Italy. Soon after, Spain, Slovakia, Romania, Bulgaria, Croatia, and Denmark also recognized and established relations with the Wang Jingwei regime as the government of China. China under the RNG also became a signatory of the Anti-Comintern Pact on 25 November 1941.

After Japan established diplomatic relations with the Holy See in 1942, they and their ally Italy pressured Pope Pius XII to recognize the RNG and allow a Chinese envoy to be appointed to the Vatican, but he refused to give in to these pressures. Instead the Vatican came to an informal agreement with Japan that their apostolic delegate in Beijing would pay visits to Catholics in the RNG's territory. The Pope also ignored the suggestion of the aforementioned apostolic delegate, Mario Zanin, who recommended in October 1941 that the Vatican recognize the Wang Jingwei regime as the legitimate government of China. Zanin would remain in the Wang Jingwei regime's territory as apostolic delegate while another bishop in Chongqing was to represent Catholic interests in Chiang Kai-shek's territory. Following Axis-aligned Vichy France's increasing yielding to Japanese pressure, such as granting them economic and military facilities and privileges in Indochina and handing over in July 1943 the keys of Shanghai's French concession to Mayor Chen Gongbo, appointed by the Wang Jingwei government, Chiang Kai-shek broke diplomatic relations with Vichy the same month and moved closer to the Free French.

The RNG had its own Foreign Section or Ministry of Foreign Affairs for managing international relations, although it was short on personnel.

On 9 January 1943, the RNG signed the "Treaty on Returning Leased Territories and Repealing Extraterritoriality Rights" with Japan, which abolished all foreign concessions within occupied China. Reportedly the date was originally to have been later that month, but was moved to January 9 to be before the United States concluded a similar treaty with Chiang Kai-shek's government. The RNG then took control of all of the international concessions in Shanghai and its other territories. Later that year Wang Jingwei attended the Greater East Asia Conference as the Chinese representative.

The Wang Jingwei government sent Chinese athletes, including the national football team, to compete in the 1940 East Asian Games, which were held in Tokyo for the 2,600th anniversary of the legendary founding of the Japanese Empire by Emperor Jimmu, and were a replacement for the cancelled 1940 Summer Olympics.

=== State ideology ===
Wang Jingwei's government promoted the idea of pan-Asianism directed against the West after Japan's pivot towards joining the Axis powers (which included signing the Tripartite Pact), an idea aimed at establishing a "New Order in East Asia" together with Japan, Manchukuo, and other Asian nations that would expel Western colonial powers from Asia, particularly the "Anglo-Saxons" (the U.S. and Britain) that dominated large parts of Asia. Wang Jingwei used pan-Asianism, basing his views on Sun Yat-sen's advocacy for Asian people to unite against the West in the early 20th century, partly to justify his efforts at working together with Japan. He claimed it was natural for Japan and China to have good relations and cooperation because of their close affinity, describing their conflicts as a temporary aberration in both nation's history. Furthermore, the government believed in the unity of all Asian nations with Japan as their leader as the only way to achieve their goals of removing Western colonial powers from Asia. There was no official description of which Asian peoples were considered to be included in this, but Wang, members of the Propaganda Ministry, and other officials of his regime writing for collaborationist media had different interpretations, at times listing Japan, China, Manchukuo, Thailand, the Philippines, Burma, Nepal, India, Afghanistan, Iran, Iraq, Syria, and Arabia as potential members of an "East Asian League."

From 1940 onwards, the RNG depicted World War II as a struggle by Asians against the West, more specifically the Anglo-American powers. The RNG had a Propaganda Ministry, which exerted control over local media outlets and used them to disseminate pan-Asianist and anti-Western propaganda. British and American diplomats in Shanghai and Nanjing noted by 1940 that the Wang Jingwei-controlled press was publishing anti-Western content. These campaigns were aided by the Japanese authorities in China and also reflected pan-Asian thought as promoted by Japanese thinkers, which intensified after the start of the Pacific War in December 1941. Pro-regime newspapers and journals published articles which cited instances of racial discrimination towards immigrant Asian communities living in the West and Western colonies in Asia. Chu Minyi, the minister of foreign affairs of the RNG, asserted in an article written shortly after the attack on Pearl Harbor that the Sino-Japanese conflict and other wars among Asians were the result of secret manipulation by the Western powers. Lin Baisheng, the minister of propaganda from 1940 to 1944, also made these claims in several of his speeches.

Since Japan was aligned with Germany, Italy, and other European Axis countries, the RNG's propaganda did not portray the conflict as a war against all white people and focused on the U.S. and Britain in particular. Their newspapers like Republican Daily praised the German people as a great race for their technological and organizational advancements and glorified the Nazi regime for supposedly transforming Germany into a great power over the past decade. The publications of the RNG also agreed with the anti-Jewish views held by Nazi Germany, with Wang Jingwei and other officials seeing Jews as dominating the American government and being conspirators with the Anglo-American powers to control the world.

The government also took measures to ban the spread of Anglo-American culture and lifestyle among Chinese people in its territory and promoted traditional Confucian culture. Generally it considered Eastern spiritual culture to be superior to the Western culture of materialism, individualism, and liberalism. Christian missionary schools and missionary activities were banned, the study of English language in schools was reduced, and the usage of English in the postal and customs system was gradually reduced as well. Vice minister of education Tai Yingfu called for a campaign against the Anglo-American nations in education. Zhou Huaren, vice minister of propaganda, blamed Chinese students that studied in the West for spreading Western values among the population and disparaging traditional Chinese culture. Wang Jingwei blamed communism, anarchism, and internationalism (which Wang considered Anglo-American thinking) for making other peoples despise their own culture and embracing the Anglo-American culture. He believed it was necessary to promote Confucianism to oppose Anglo-American "cultural aggression." At the same time, Zhou Huaren and others also thought that it was necessary to adopt Western scientific advancements while combining them with traditional Eastern culture to develop themselves, as he said Japan did in the Meiji Restoration, seeing that as a model for others to follow.

In addition to its pan-Asianism, nationalism was part of the regime ideology.

=== Ideological apparatus and propaganda institutions ===
Prior to the establishment of the RNG in March 1940, organized political propaganda played only a limited role in the administration later associated with Wang Jingwei. Even after the formal creation of the regime, the production and dissemination of pro-Japanese political materials remained a high-risk and low-return undertaking. But as the government gradually expanded its administrative reach, however, ideological messaging and political publications became increasingly visible and systematic.

Lacking autonomous military power and facing widespread domestic skepticism, the Wang Jingwei regime sought to compensate through the construction of a coherent ideological framework. Propaganda and political education thus functioned not merely as instruments of persuasion, but as mechanisms intended to supply normative justification and institutional continuity, particularly by invoking elements of prewar Nationalist political discourse.

The institutional center of ideological production under the Wang Jingwei regime was the Ministry of Propaganda, established in 1940. The ministry was tasked with coordinating political messaging, supervising publications, and articulating the regime’s official ideological positions. Over time, it evolved from a marginal administrative unit into one of the most influential organs within the government, reflecting the growing importance attached to ideological governance.

A key figure in the organization and operation of the propaganda apparatus was Lin Bosheng, an experienced newspaper editor and longtime associate of Wang Jingwei. As Deputy Minister of Propaganda (later Minister after the withdraw of Tao Xisheng), Lin mobilized extensive media networks to shape public representations of Wang Jingwei as a constitutional leader, explicitly contrasting this image with portrayals of Chiang Kai-shek as a dictator. Under the supervision of the Ministry of Propaganda, a range of newspapers and periodicals—including China Daily News, South China Daily, New Orient, and later more explicitly ideological journals—were integrated into a centralized propaganda system.

In addition to formal state institutions, the regime relied on a constellation of semi-official organizations that functioned as extensions of the propaganda apparatus, most notably those associated with the East Asia League.

Founded in late 1940, the East Asia League China Comrades Association publicly presented itself as an organization dedicated to the ideological unification of China. In practice, it functioned primarily as a propaganda body responsible for disseminating pro-Japanese interpretations of Asianism and promoting the League’s four guiding principles. Its leadership included a number of prominent political and cultural figures associated with the regime. The association worked in close coordination with the Ministry of Propaganda, particularly through jointly produced publications and synchronized messaging.

Distinct from the Comrades Association was the East Asia League China Headquarters, a formal political organization established on 1 February 1941. Wang Jingwei served as its president, while senior government officials such as Zhou Fohai and Chen Gongbo participated in its administration. Whereas the Comrades Association operated primarily in the ideological and cultural sphere, the Headquarters functioned as a political body designed to institutionalize the regime’s commitment to East Asian cooperation within its governmental structure.

Daily newspapers and widely circulated periodicals constituted the most visible layer of the regime’s propaganda system. These outlets were used to normalize political narratives, disseminate official statements, and reinforce representations of Wang Jingwei’s leadership. Through repeated emphasis on constitutionalism, peace, and reconstruction, mass media played a central role in embedding ideological themes into everyday political discourse.

More specialized journals served as platforms for systematic ideological elaboration. Great Asianism, first published in August 1940, was the earliest periodical explicitly devoted to articulating the concept of Asianism within the regime’s political framework. While Lin Bosheng contributed regularly, much of the journal’s substantive ideological content was written by Zhou Huaren, whose essays were later collected and published as monographs. These publications sought to situate the regime’s policies within a broader historical narrative of Asian victimization under Western imperialism.

In July 1942, Great Asianism was merged with the East Asia League Monthly to form Great Asianism and the East Asia League. The consolidation reflected both ideological convergence and wartime financial pressures. The new journal emphasized the inseparability of Asianism and the East Asia League, presenting them as a unified political project. Publication continued until 1943, when increasing material constraints led to its termination.

Besides Lin Bosheng, Zhou Huaren and Yang Honglie have also been viewed as leading ideologues behind the ideological system of the Wang Jingwei regime.

Zhou Huaren was among the most prolific ideological contributors associated with the regime. Although formally serving as vice minister in the Ministry of Railways, he is widely regarded by scholars as one of the principal architects of the regime’s ideological discourse. Zhou’s writings framed Asianism as a response to a shared history of exploitation by Western powers and argued that only through Sino-Japanese cooperation and the establishment of an Asian alliance could this condition be overcome. His works remain among the most comprehensive treatments of Asianism produced in Chinese during the wartime period.

Yang Honglie represented a more academic articulation of Asianism. A legal historian educated in Japan and a professional editor within the Ministry of Publicity, Yang authored the influential series “Eight Lectures on Asianism,” (亞洲主義八講) published in regime-affiliated journals. His writings demonstrated a high degree of continuity between prewar and wartime intellectual discourse, integrating Chinese political thought with contemporary Japanese political and military ideology. While often accommodating Japanese strategic perspectives, Yang’s work constituted one of the earliest systematic historical narratives of Asianism in the Chinese language.

=== National defense ===
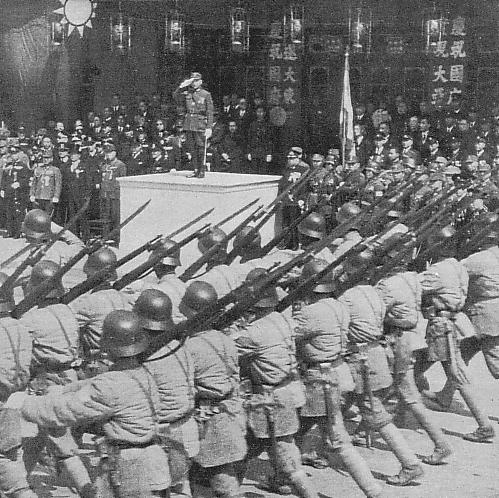
President Wang Jingwei at a military parade on the occasion of the third anniversary of the establishment of the government

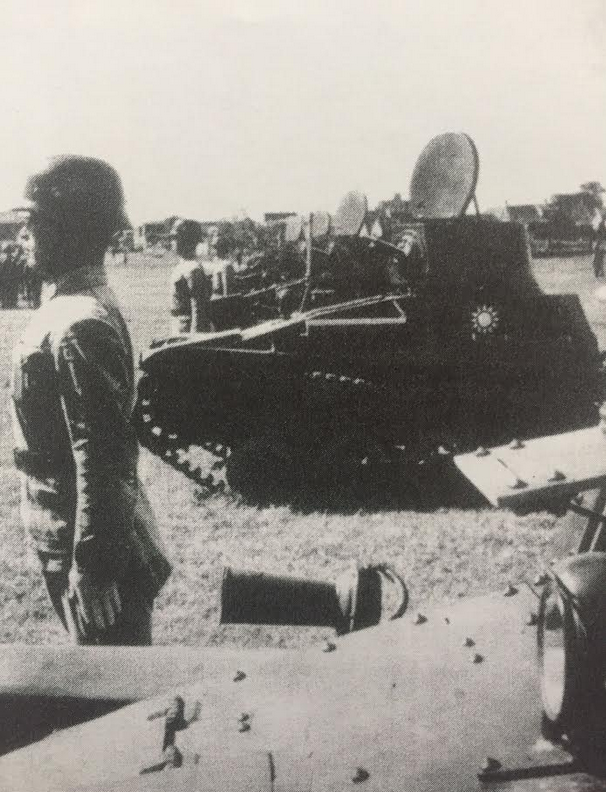
Type 94 tankettes on parade (note the driver's Stahlhelm and the KMT blue and white sun emblem on the tanks)

During its existence, the RNG nominally led a large army often called the "Nanjing Army" that was estimated to have included 300,000 to 500,000 men, along with a smaller navy and air force. Although its land forces possessed limited armor and artillery, they were primarily an infantry force. Military aid from Japan was also very limited despite Japanese promises to assist the RNG in the "Japan–China Military Affairs Agreement" that they signed. All military matters were the responsibility of the Central Military Commission, but in practice that body was mainly a ceremonial one. In reality, many of the army's commanders operated outside of the direct command of the central government in Nanjing. The majority of its officers were either former National Revolutionary Army personnel or warlord officers from the early Republican era. Thus their reliability and combat capability was questionable, and Wang Jingwei was estimated to only be able to count on the loyalty of about 10% to 15% of his nominal forces. Among the reorganized government's best units were three Capital Guards divisions based in Nanjing, Zhou Fohai's Taxation Police Corps, and the 1st Front Army of Ren Yuandao.

The majority of the government's forces were armed with a mix of captured Nationalist weaponry and a small amount of Japanese equipment, the latter mainly being given to Nanjing's best units. The lack of local military industry for the duration of the war meant that the RNG had trouble arming its troops. While the army was mainly an infantry force, in 1941 it did receive 18 Type 94 tankettes for a token armored force, and reportedly they also received 20 armored cars and 24 motorcycles. The main type of artillery in use were medium mortars, but they also possessed 31 field guns (which included Model 1917 mountain guns)—mainly used by the Guards divisions. Oftentimes, the troops were equipped with the German Stahlhelm, which were used in large quantities by the Chinese Nationalist Army. For small arms, there was no standard rifle and a large variety of different weapons were used, which made supplying them with ammunition difficult. The most common rifles in use was the Chinese version of the Mauser 98k and the Hanyang 88, while other notable weapons included Chinese copies of the Czechoslovak ZB-26 machine guns.

Along with the great variation in equipment, there was also a disparity in sizes of units. Some "armies" had only a few thousand troops while some "divisions" several thousand. There was a standard divisional structure, but only the elite Guards divisions closer to the capital actually had anything resembling it. In addition to these regular army forces, there were multiple police and local militia, which numbered in the tens of thousands, but were deemed to be completely unreliable by the Japanese. Most of the units located around Beijing in northern China remained, in effect, under the authority of the North China Political Council rather than that of the central government. In an attempt to improve the quality of the officer corps, multiple military academies had been opened, including a Central Military Academy in Nanjing and a Naval Academy in Shanghai. In addition there was a military academy in Beijing for the North China Political Council's forces, and a branch of the central academy in Canton.

A small navy was established with naval bases at Weihaiwei and Qingdao, but it mostly consisted of small patrol boats that were used for coastal and river defense. Reportedly, the captured Nationalist cruisers Ning Hai and Ping Hai were handed over to the government by the Japanese, becoming important propaganda tools. However, the Imperial Japanese Navy took them back in 1943 for its own use. In addition there were two regiments of marines, one at Canton and the other at Weihaiwei. By 1944, the navy was under direct command of Ren Yuandao, the naval minister. An Air Force of the RNG was established in May 1941 with the opening of the Aviation School and receiving three aircraft, Tachikawa Ki-9 trainers. In the future the air force received additional Ki-9 and Ki-55 trainers as well as multiple transports. Plans by Wang Jingwei to form a fighter squadron with Nakajima Ki-27s did not come to fruition as the Japanese did not trust the pilots enough to give them combat aircraft. Morale was low and a number of defections took place. The only two offensive aircraft they did possess were Tupolev SB bombers which were flown by defecting Nationalist crews.

The RNG's army was primarily tasked with garrison and police duties in the occupied territories. It also took part in anti-partisan operations against Communist guerrillas, such as in the Hundred Regiments Offensive, or played supporting roles for the Imperial Japanese Army (IJA). The RNG undertook a "rural pacification" campaign to eradicate communists from the countryside, arresting and executing many people suspected of being communists, with support from the Japanese.

=== Japanese methods of recruiting ===
During the conflicts in central China, the Japanese utilized several methods to recruit Chinese volunteers. Japanese sympathisers including Nanjing's pro-Japanese governor, or major local landowners such as Ni Daolang, were used to recruit local peasants in return for money or food. The Japanese recruited 5,000 volunteers in the Anhui area for the RNG Army. Japanese forces and the RNG used slogans like "Lay down your guns and take up the plough", "Oppose the Communist Bandits" or "Oppose Corrupt Government and Support the Reformed Government" to dissuade guerrilla attacks and buttress its support.

The Japanese used various methods for subjugating the local populace. Initially, fear was used to maintain order, but this approach was altered following appraisals by Japanese military ideologists. In 1939, the Japanese army attempted some populist policies, including:

- land reform by dividing the property of major landowners into small holdings, and allocating them to local peasants;
- providing the Chinese with medical services, including vaccination against cholera, typhus, and varicella, and treatments for other diseases;
- ordering Japanese soldiers not to violate women or laws;
- dropping leaflets from aeroplanes, offering rewards for information (with parlays set up by use of a white surrender flag), the handing over of weapons or other actions beneficial to the Japanese cause. Money and food were often incentives used; and
- dispersal of candy, food and toys to children

Buddhist leaders inside the occupied Chinese territories ("Shao-Kung") were also forced to give public speeches and persuade people of the virtues of a Chinese alliance with Japan, including advocating the breaking-off of all relations with Western powers and ideas.

In 1938, a manifesto was launched in Shanghai, reminding the populace the Japanese alliance's track-record in maintaining "moral supremacy" as compared to the often fractious nature of the previous Republican control, and also accusing Generalissimo Chiang Kai-Shek of treason for maintaining the Western alliance.

In support of such efforts, in 1941 Wang Jingwei proposed the Qingxiang Plan to be applied along the lower course of the Yangtze River. A Qingxiang Plan Committee (Qingxiang Weiyuan-hui) was formed with himself as chairman, and Zhou Fohai and Chen Gongbo (as first and second vice-chairmen respectively). Li Shiqun was made the committee's secretary. Beginning in July 1941, Wang maintained that any areas to which the plan was applied would convert into "model areas of peace, anti-communism, and rebuilders of the country" (heping fangong jianguo mofanqu). It was not a success.

== Political boundaries ==
Map of the Republic of China that was controlled by the RNG in 1940-1945 (dark green) Mengjiang was incorporated in 1940 (light green)

In theory, the RNG claimed all of China with the exception of Manchukuo, which it recognized as an independent state. In actuality, at the time of its formation, the Reorganized Government controlled only Jiangsu, Anhui, and the north sector of Zhejiang, all being Japanese-controlled territories after 1937.

Thereafter, the Reorganized Government's actual borders waxed and waned as the Japanese gained or lost territory during the course of the war. During the December 1941 Japanese offensive the Reorganized Government extended its control over Hunan, Hubei, and parts of Jiangxi provinces. The port of Shanghai and the cities of Hankou and Wuchang were also placed under control of the Reformed Government after 1940.

The Japanese-controlled provinces of Shandong and Hebei were de jure part of this political entity, though they were de facto under military administration of the Japanese Northern China Area Army from its headquarters in Beijing. Likewise, the Japanese-controlled territories in central China were under military administration of the Japanese Sixth Area Army from its headquarters in Hankou (Wuhan). Other Japanese-controlled territories had military administrations directly reporting to the Japanese military headquarters in Nanjing, with the exception of Guangdong and Guangxi which briefly had its headquarters in Canton. The central and southern zones of military occupation were eventually linked together after Operation Ichi-Go in 1944, though the Japanese garrison had no effective control over most of this region apart from a narrow strip around the Guangzhou–Hankou railway.

The Reorganized Government's control was mostly limited to:

- Jiangsu: 41,818 mi^{2} (108,310 km^{2}); capital: Zhenjiang (also included the national capital of Nanjing)
- Anhui: 51,888 mi^{2} (134,390 km^{2}); capital: Anqing
- Zhejiang: 39,780 mi^{2} (103,000 km^{2}); capital: Hangzhou

According to other sources, total extension of territory during 1940 period was 1,264,000 km^{2}.

In 1940 an agreement was signed between the Inner Mongolian puppet state of Mengjiang and the RNG, incorporating the former into the latter as an autonomous part.

== Economy ==
The North China Transportation Company and the Central China Railway were established by the former Provisional Government and Reformed Government, which had nationalised private railway and bus companies that operated in their territories, and continued to function providing railway and bus services in the RNG's territory.

After its 1941 declaration of war against the United States and the United Kingdom, Japan moved into the foreign areas of the city that it had not previously occupied after the Battle of Shanghai. It seized most of the banks in these areas of Shanghai (and occupied Tianjin) and declared that the Nationalist currency fabi had to be exchanged for bank notes of the Wang Jingwei regime at a mandated rate of 2:1 before June 1, 1942. For most Chinese in these occupied areas, the exchange meant that their fabi lost half its value and a major blow to the economy of the lower Yangzi resulted.

== Life under the regime ==
Japanese under the regime had greater access to coveted wartime luxuries, and the Japanese enjoyed things like matches, rice, tea, coffee, cigars, foods, and alcoholic drinks, all of which were scarce in Japan proper. However, consumer goods became more scarce after Japan entered World War II. In Japanese-occupied Chinese territories the prices of basic necessities rose substantially as Japan's war effort expanded. By 1941, these prices in Shanghai increased eleven-fold.

Daily life was often difficult in the Nanjing Nationalist Government-controlled Republic of China, and grew increasingly so as the war turned against Japan (c. 1943). Local residents resorted to the black market in order to obtain needed items or to influence the ruling establishment. The Kempeitai (Japanese Military Police Corps), Tokubetsu Kōtō Keisatsu (Special Higher Police), collaborationist Chinese police, and Chinese citizens in the service of the Japanese all worked to censor information, monitor any opposition, and torture enemies and dissenters. A "native" secret agency, the Tewu, was created with the aid of Japanese Army "advisors". The Japanese also established prisoner-of-war detention centres, concentration camps, and kamikaze training centres to indoctrinate pilots.

Since Wang's government held authority only over territories under Japanese military occupation, there was a limited amount that officials loyal to Wang could do to ease the suffering of Chinese under Japanese occupation. Wang himself became a focal point of anti-Japanese resistance. He was demonised and branded as an "arch-traitor" in both KMT and Communist rhetoric. Wang and his government were deeply unpopular with the Chinese populace, who regarded them as traitors to both the Chinese state and Han Chinese identity. Wang's rule was constantly undermined by resistance and sabotage.

The strategy of the local education system was to create a workforce suited for employment in factories and mines, and for manual labor. The Japanese also attempted to introduce their culture and dress to the Chinese. Complaints and agitation called for more meaningful Chinese educational development. Shinto temples and similar cultural centers were built in order to instill Japanese culture and values. These activities came to a halt at the end of the war.

== Notable figures ==
Local administration:

- Wang Jingwei: President and Head of State
- Chen Gongbo: President and Head of State after the death of Wang. Also, President of the Legislative Yuan (1940–1944) and Mayor of the Shanghai occupied sector.
- Zhou Fohai: Vice President and Finance Minister in the Executive Yuan
- Wen Tsungyao: Chief of the Judicial Yuan
- Wang Kemin: Internal Affairs Minister, previously head of the Provisional Government of the Republic of China
- Liang Hongzhi: Head of the Legislative Yuan (1944–1945), previously head of the Reformed Government
- Yin Ju-keng: Member of the Legal Affairs Department, previously head of the East Hebei Autonomous Government
- Wang Yitang: Minister of the Examination Yuan, Chairman of the North China Political Council (1940–1943)
- Jiang Kanghu: Chief of the Education Yuan
- Xia Qifeng: Chief of the Auditing Bureau of the Control Yuan
- Ren Yuandao: Minister of the Navy (1940–1945) & Chairman of the National Military Council (1940–1942)
- Xiao Shuxuan: Minister of Military Affairs (1945) & Chairman of the National Military Council (1942–1945)
- Yang Kuiyi: Chief of General Staff (1940–1942) & Chairman of the National Military Council (1945)
- Bao Wenyue: Minister of Military Affairs (1940–1943) & Chief of General Staff (1943–1945)
- Ye Peng: Minister of Military Affairs (1943–1945) & Chief of General Staff (1942)
- Xiang Zhizhuang: Commander of the 5th Group Army, Commander of the 12th Army, Governor and Commander of Security in Zhejiang Province, Governor of Jiangsu Province
- Rong Zhen: Chief of the Committee for Subjugation Communists, Governor of Hebei Province (1945)
- Kou Yingjie: Councilor of the General Staff office
- Liu Yufen: Chief of General Staff (1942–1943)
- Hu Yukun: Chief of General Staff (1945)
- Hao Pengju: Chief of Staff of the 1st Army group, Governor of Huaihai, General commander of the 6th Route Army
- Wu Huawen: Commander in Chief of the 3rd Front Army
- Qi Xieyuan: Commander-in-Chief of the North China Appeasement army, Supervisor of the General administration of Justice
- Sun Dianying: Commander of the Collaborationist Chinese Army 6th group army district
- Ding Mocun: Chief of the Collaborationist Secret police, Minister of Society, Minister of Transport, Governor of Zhejiang province
- Li Shiqun: Head of No. 76, the regime's secret service stationed in No. 76 Jessefield Road in Shanghai
- Zhu Xingyuan: Chief of the Agency of Political Affairs
- Tang Erho: Chairman of the North China Political Affairs Commission
- Gu Zhongchen: Vice-Chief of the Examination Yuan (1940–1944), Chief of the Examination Yuan (1944–1945)
- Thung Liang Lee: director of the International Publicity Bureau (1940–1945)
- Xia Suchu: Executive Vice-chief to the Evaluation Department of the Examination Yuan, Chief Secretary of the Examination Yuan
- Chen Qun: Interior Minister (1940–1943)
- Luo Junqiang: Minister of Justice (1942–1943), Governor of Anhui (1943–1944)
- Zhao Yusong: Minister of Agriculture (1940–1941), Minister of Justice (1941–1942), Minister of Civil Service (1942–1943)
- Mei Siping: Interior Minister (1943–1945)
- Su Tiren: Governor of Shanxi (1938–1943), Mayor of Beijing Special city (1943)
- Zhao Zhengping: Minister of Education (1940–1941)
- Wang Shijing: Executive Member and Governor to the General Office for Finance, Governor of the General Office for Economy
- Zhou Huaren: Executive Vice-Minister of Railways, Mayor of Guangzhou Special Municipality
- Lin Bosheng: Propaganda Minister (1940–1944)
- Zhao Zhuyue: Propaganda Minister (1944–1945)
- Gao Guanwu: Mayor of Nanjing Special City (1938–1940), Governor of Jiangsu (1940–1943), Governor of Anhui (1943), Governor of Jiangxi (1943–1945)
- Chen Zemin: Governor of Jiangsu Province
- Yu Jinhe: Mayor of Beijing Special City (1938–1943)
- Lin Biao (born 1889): Chief of the Administrative High Court
- Okinori Kaya: Japanese nationalist, merchant, and commercial adviser
- Chu Minyi: Foreign Minister (1940; 1941–1945), ambassador to Japan (1940–1941)
- Cai Pei: Mayor of Nanjing Special City (1940–1942), ambassador to Japan (1943–1945)
- Xu Liang: Foreign Minister (1940–1941), ambassador to Japan (1941–1943)
- Li Shengwu: Foreign Minister (1945), ambassador to Germany
- Zhang Renli: Mayor of Tianjin Special City (1943)
- Yan Jiachi: Vice-Minister for Finance, Control Officer of the Control Yuan
- Xu Xiuzhi: Mayor of Beijing Special City (1945)
- Lian Yu: ambassador to Manchukuo (1940–1943), ambassador to Japan (1945)
- Zhu Lühe: Vice-Chief of the Judicial Yuan, Chairperson of the Disciplinary Action Committee for Central Public Servants
- Wen Shizhen: Mayor of Tianjin Special City (1939–1943)
- Wang Xugao: Governor of Jinhaidao, Mayor of Tianjin Special City
- Wang Yintai: Governor of the General Office for Business, Governor of the General Office for Agriculture, Chairperson of the North China Political Council
- Chen Jicheng: ambassador to Manchukuo (1943–1945)
- Wang Xiang (Republic of China politician): Chief of the Agency for Education in Shanxi, Governor and Security Commander of Shanxi
- He Peirong: Governor of Hubei province (1938–1942), Commander of Security in Hubei
- Ni Daolang: Governor of Anhui Province
- Wang Ruikai: Governor of Zhejiang province (1938–1941)
- Zhu Qinglai: Minister of Transport, Chairman of the Irrigation Commission, Vice-Chief of the Legislative Yuan
- Wu Zanzhou: Governor of Hebei province (1939–1943), President of the Police High School
- Shao Wenkai: Governor of Henan province
- Wang Mo: Chief of the General Office for Education
- Chao Kung: (Ignaz Trebitsch-Lincoln), purported Buddhist leader
- Zhou Longxiang: Diplomat, Chief Secretary of the Executive Yuan, Chief of the Civil Servants.
- Zhou Xuechang: Mayor of Nanjing Special City (1941–1945)
- Zhu Shen: Executive Member and Chief of the Agency for Political Affairs, Chairperson of the North China Political Council
- Yu Baoxuan: Observer to the Commission for High Ranking Officers Examination
- Li Fang (diplomat): Foreign minister to Romania and Hungary, Ambassador to Germany
- Yin Tong: Governor of the General Office for Construction
- Hao Peng (ROC): Chief Executive of the Suhuai Special Region, Commander of the Suhuai Special Region Security forces
- Wu Songgao: Secretary of the Central Political Committee, Vice-Minister for Judicial Administrating, Chairman of the committee for Baojia system
- Yue Kaixian: Chief of the General Office for Business
- Deng Zuyu: Governor of Jiangxi province (1943)

Foreign representatives and diplomatic personnel:

- Nobuyuki Abe: Japanese ambassador to the RNG (1940)
- Kumataro Honda: Japanese ambassador (1940–1941)
- Mamoru Shigemitsu: Japanese ambassador (1941–1943)
- Masayuki Tani: Japanese ambassador (1943–1945)
- Teiichi Suzuki: Japanese military and political adviser
- Sadaaki Kagesa: Japanese military advisor
- Zang Shiyi: Manchukuo ambassador
- Li Shaogeng: Manchukuo special envoy
- Heinrich Georg Stahmer: German ambassador (1941–1943)
- Erich Kordt: German ambassador (1943)
- Ernst Woermann: German ambassador (1943–1945)
- Francesco Maria Taliani de Marchio: Italian ambassador (1941–1943)
- Álvaro de Maldonado y de Liñán: Spanish minister (1941–1943)
- José González de Gregorio: Spanish chargé d'affaires (1944–1945)
- Hialmar Collin: Danish minister (1941–1945)

== Legacy ==
Having died before the war had ended, Wang Jingwei was unable to join his fellow Reorganized Nationalist Government leaders on trial for treason in the months that followed the Japanese surrender. Instead he, alongside his presidential successor Chen Gongbo (who was tried and sentenced to death by the victorious Nationalists) and his vice president Zhou Fohai (who had his death sentence commuted to life imprisonment), was given the title Hanjian meaning arch-traitor to the Han people.

Characterizations of the regime are a matter of historical debate. In general, evaluations produced by scholars working under the People's Republic of China have held the most critical interpretations of the failed regime, Western scholars typically holding the government and Wang Jingwei especially in a sympathetic light, with Taiwanese scholars falling somewhere in the middle. The Western characterization of the regime is generally as collaborationist, while Chinese sources have often characterized it as illegitimate. In mainland China discourses, the historical figure of Wang himself is tied to the idea of hanjian 汉奸 ("traitor to the Han nation").

== In popular culture ==
Wang's collaborationist government was a taboo subject on Chinese screen until Ang Lee's 2007 Chinese-American co-production Lust, Caution, the first film the Chinese authorities permitted to be set against this backdrop. The notable works set against the RNG include:

- The erotic espionage film Lust Caution (2007) by Ang Lee, based on the 1979 novella of the same name by Eileen Chang, is about a group of university students who attempt to assassinate a high-ranking official at the RNG. The story is inspired by Zheng Pingru's attempted assassination on Ding Mocun.
- The thriller The Message (2009), based on the novel of the same name by Mai Jia in the vein of Agatha Christie, is about the Japanese imperial forces' effort to uncover a double agent within a group of RNG codebreakers, all detained in a castle for psychological and physical coercion.
- The spy thriller TV series Sparrow (2016) is about a communist agent, code name "Sparrow," in Shanghai under the rule of the RNG.

== See also ==
- Manchukuo
- Great Way Government
- Second Sino-Japanese War
- History of the Republic of China
- National Revolutionary Army
- Collaborationist Chinese Army
- Organization of the China Garrison detachment of the Imperial Japanese Army (to 1937)
- Organization of Japanese Expeditionary forces in China
- List of East Asian leaders in the Japanese sphere of influence (1931–1945)
- List of leaders of the Republic of China

== Notes ==
Preceded by Provisional Government of the Republic of China (1937–40); Reformed Government of the Republic of China (1938–40)	Reorganized National Government of the Republic of China; 1940–1945	Succeeded by Nationalist government (1927–1948)
