= List of East Asian leaders in the Japanese sphere of influence (1931–1945) =

This is a list of some Asian leaders and politicians, with a commitment to the Japanese cause, in the Yen Block or Greater Asian Co-Prosperity Sphere Pan-Asian economic associations previous to and during the Pacific War period, between 1931–1945.

== Empire of Manchukuo ==
- Puyi, the Kangde Emperor (Monarch and Head of State)
- Zheng Xiaoxu (Prime Minister of Manchukuo)
- Zhang Jinghui (next Prime Minister until 1945)

== Jewish Far East Community in Manchukuo ==
- Dr.Abraham Kaufman (Local Harbin Zionist anticommunist leader)

== Chōsen ==
- Crown Prince Euimin (Yi Eun) (Korean Imperial House chief and local leader)
- Prince Imperial Ui (Gyn Rhee) (Korean Imperial House chief and supporter)

== White Russians Community in Manchukuo ==
- Konstantin Vladimirovich Rodzaevsky (White Russian anticommunist leader)
- General Kislitsin (another White Russian anti-Soviet chief)
- General Vrashevsky (White Russian anti-Stalinist leader, also Japanese follower)

== Provisional Government of the Republic of China (North China Political Council), Reformed Government of the Republic of China and the Wang Jingwei regime ==
- President Wang Kemin (Head of State of the Provisional Government, later Chairman of the North China Political Council and Minister of Internal Affairs for the Wang Jingwei regime)
- President Liang Hongzhi (Head of State of the Reformed Government, later Governor of Jiangsu Province and Chairman of the Legislative Yuan for the Wang Jingwei regime)
- President Wang Jingwei (First Head of State of the Wang Jingwei regime)
- President Chen Gongbo (Second Head of State of the Wang Jingwei regime, previously the Mayor of Shanghai)

== Mengjiang ==
- Demchugdongrub (Head of State)

== Malaya ==
- Sultan Ibrahim of Johor (local Malay Islamic leader)
- Sultan Musa Ghiatuddin Riayat Shah of Selangor (local Malay Islamic leader)
- Ibrahim Hj Yaacob – founder of Kesatuan Melayu Muda

== Second Philippine Republic ==
- José P. Laurel (President of the Japanese inaugurated Republic)
- Emilio Aguinaldo (former Philippine president, also supported Japanese cause for sometime)
- Benigno Aquino Sr. (former Speaker of the National Assembly of the Republic and leader of the pro-Japan KALIBAPI)

== Dutch East Indies-Indonesia ==
- Sukarno (native Indonesian Nationalist leader)
- Mohammad Hatta (local Indonesian Nationalist leader, with Sukarno as Dwitunggal)
- Radjiman Wediodiningrat (native Indonesian Islamic politic)

== French Indochina ==
- Admiral Jean Decoux (Vichy French governor)

== Empire of Vietnam ==
- Emperor Bảo Đại (Vietnamese Head of State)
- Trần Trọng Kim (Local Vietnamese leader)
- Trinh Minh The (Vietnamese nationalist and military leader)

== Kingdom of Kampuchea (Cambodia) ==
- Norodom Sihanouk (Cambodian Head of State and Head of Government; king and prime minister simultaneously)
- Son Ngoc Thanh (Native Cambodian leader, succeeded Sihanouk as prime minister)

== Kingdom of Laos ==
- Prince Phetxarāt (Laotian Political Chief)

== Thailand ==
- Field Marshal Plaek Phibunsongkhram (Head of Government and military strongman)
- Prince Wan Waithayakon (Diplomat and propagandist)

== State of Burma ==
- Ba Maw (local Burmese chief, and Head of State)
- U Aung San (local Burmese supporter for certain period)
- Bo Ne Win (native Burmese military supporter)

== Arzi Hukumat-e-Azad Hind (Free India) ==
- Subhas Chandra Bose (legendary Indian Freedom Struggle Hero. Head of State of Provisional Government of Free India)
- A. M. Sahay (another Indian leader and Japanese political follower)
- Rash Behari Bose (Indian pro-Japanese leader)
- Habib Hassan (Indian pro-Japanese leader)

== Afghanistan ==
- Sardar Mohammad Hashim Khan (native Afghan Islamic leader)

== First East Turkestan Republic ==
- Muhammad Amin Bughra (Emir)
