= Ni Daolang =

Chinese politician (1879–1952)

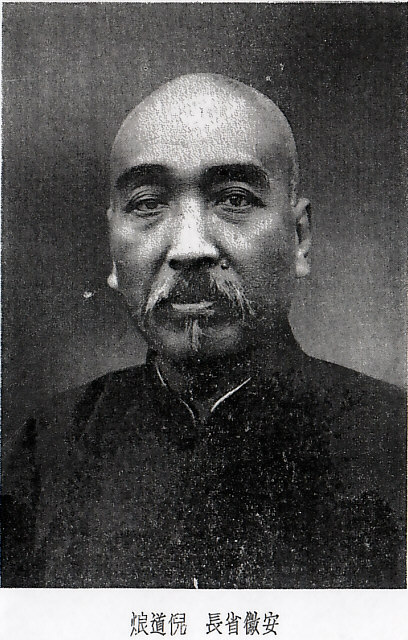
Ni Daolang

Ni Daolang (Chinese: 倪道烺; pinyin: Ní Dàolǎng; Wade–Giles: Ni Tao-lang; April 12, 1879 − May 10, 1952) was a politician and military leader in the Republic of China. He was an important politician of the Reformed Government of the Republic of China and the Reorganized National Government of China (Republic of China-Nanjing). His courtesy name was Bingwen (炳文). He was born in Fuyang, Anhui, and was a nephew of Anhui clique General Ni Sichong.

== Biography ==
In 1913, Ni Sichong was appointed Military Governor of Anhui; Ni Daolang was also appointed Governor of the Marketing for Changlu Salt General Bureau (長蘆鹽雲銷總局總辦). In 1918, Ni Daolang was appointed Manager of the Fengyang Barrier (鳳陽關). On June 2, 1921, he suppressed a demonstration of students by using military force (the Tragic Incident of June 2, Anhui), so he was criticized by public opinion, and having lost his post, he escaped to Tianjin.

In November 1924, Duan Qirui was appointed Provisional Chief Executive (臨時執政), and Ni Daolang was appointed Special Negotiator for Military Countermeasure to Anhui. In early 1927, Zhang Zongchang was appointed Vice-Supreme Commander of the Anguojun and was the Supreme Commander of the Zhili-Shandong (Zhi-Lu) United Army. Zhang invited Ni, and appointed him Commander of the Reserve of the Zhi-Lu United Army. After the National Revolutionary Army defeated the Zhili-Shandong United Army, Ni escaped to Tianjin again.

In 1937, the Second Sino-Japanese War broke out, and Ni Daolang contacted Liang Hongzhi, Yin Rugeng, Jiang Chaozong, and Wang Yitang, secretly harbouring intentions of creating a pro-Japanese government. Next July, Ni became the president of the Local Preservation Council of Anhui Province. In November, he joined the Reformed Government of the Republic of China and was appointed Governor of Anhui Province.

When in September the committee system was introduced to Anhui Provincial Government, Ni remained as its head. In January 1943, Anhui Provincial Government abolished the committee system, on that time, Ni also resigned from his post. From 1942, he worked as Member of the Nanjing National Government.

After the Reorganized National Government of the Republic of China collapsed, Ni Daolang was arrested by Chiang Kai-shek's National Government. After the proclamation of the People's Republic of China, he was sent to Bengbu in March 1952. He was convicted of treason and surrender to the enemy (namely hanjian) and sentenced to death on the Court-martial of the Committee for Control of the Military, Bengbu City. On May 10, he was executed.

Political offices
Preceded by office established	Governor of Anhui (Reformed Government of the Republic of China); 1938–1940	Succeeded by Reformed Government of the Republic of China merges into Reorganized National Government of China
Preceded by continued from the Reformed Government of the Republic of China	Governor of Anhui (Wang Jingwei Government); 1940–1943 (in the period September 1940 – January 1943 as Head of Government)	Succeeded by Gao Guanwu
