= Wen Zongyao =

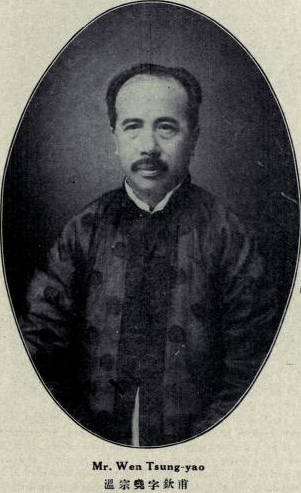
- Wen Zongyao (Who's Who in China 3rd ed., 1925)
- Born: 1876; Xinning, Guangdong, Qing dynasty
- Died: 30 November 1947 (aged 70–71); Nanking, Republic of china
- Education: Imperial Tientsin University
Wen Zongyao
- Traditional Chinese: 溫宗堯
- Simplified Chinese: 温宗尧
Transcriptions
Standard Mandarin
- Hanyu Pinyin: Wēn Zōngyáo
- Bopomofo: ㄨㄣ ㄗㄨㄥㄧㄠˊ
- Wade–Giles: Wen^{1} Tsung^{1}-yao^{2}
Yue: Cantonese
- Jyutping: Wan^{1} Zung^{1}-jiu^{4}
other Yue
- Taishanese: Vun^{1} Duung^{1}-ngiu^{4}
Courtesy name
- Traditional Chinese: 欽甫
- Simplified Chinese: 钦甫
Transcriptions
Standard Mandarin
- Hanyu Pinyin: Qīn Fǔ
- Bopomofo: ㄑㄧㄣ ㄈㄨˇ
- Wade–Giles: Ch'in^{1} Fu^{3}
Yue: Cantonese
- Jyutping: Jam^{1} Fu^{2}
other Yue
- Taishanese: Him^{1} Fu^{2}

Wen Zongyao or Wen Tsung-yao (traditional Chinese: 溫宗堯; simplified Chinese: 温宗尧; pinyin: Wēn Zōngyáo) (1876 – November 30, 1947), courtesy name Qinfu (欽甫), was a politician and diplomat in the Qing dynasty and the Republic of China. In the late Qing era, he belonged to the pro-reform group. In the era of the Republic, he participated in the Sun Yat-sen's Canton Militarist Government. However, during the invasion of Japanese, he was a leading politician in the Reformed Government of the Republic of China and the Wang Jingwei regime, which were puppets state installed by the Japanese. He was born in Xinning, now Taishan), Guangdong.

== Biography ==
=== In late Qing dynasty ===
He entered the Government Central School, Hong Kong (中央書院), and Sun Yat-sen was his schoolmate. He was a member of the Furen Literary Society which advocated revolution against the Qing dynasty. In 1895 Wen joined the Revive China Society founded by Sun. In 1897 he studied at the Imperial Tientsin University, after graduating, he became an English teacher of the Queen's College (reformed from the Government Central School). Later he became a secretary for Feng Keyi (馮克伊) who engaged in the work for negotiating to United Kingdom.

In July 1900 Wen Zongyao participated in the Independence Army uprising which was organized by pr-reform leader Tang Caichang, and Wen was appointed a representative for foreign affairs to Shanghai. In next month, Tang failed to rise in rebellion against Qing dynasty and was executed. Wen escaped to Southern China and got positions under the Viceroy of Liangguang. From 1903 to 1908, he successively held the positions of Chief of Foreign Affairs Bureau of Liangguang (兩廣洋務局局長), Director to the Telephone Administration of Guangdong, Director to the Military Cadets' Academy of Guangdong (廣東將辦學堂), etc. In 1904 he was sent to India as Deputy Envoy to negotiate with the British Government over the question of British trade in Tibet (英藏訂約副大臣) and a member of the Tang Shaoyi's party. In same August Wen returned to China, and became a secretary for foreign affairs to the Viceroy of Liangguang Cen Chunxuan.

In 1908 Wen Zongyao was appointed Deputy President resident in Tibet (駐藏參贊大臣) as the representative of Qing dynasty. On that time, United Kingdom's influence to Dalai Lama XIII was strengthened. So Wen wanted to recover Qing's influence, and insisted that Qing's troops station at Tibet to Dalai Lama XIII. But Dalai Lama XIII had protested against Qing's troops entered to Tibet, he fled to India, and Qing declared dethroning him. Later Wen returned to Peking, he was appointed a Councilor of the Foreign Office.

=== In the early years of the Republic of China ===
In October 1911 Xinhai Revolution broke out, Wen Zongyao, Wu Tingfang and Zhang Jian declared their support for republicanism. After the Republic of China was established in 1912, Wen participated in the movement for political parties. In August 1912 he participated in the Song Jiaoren's Kuomintang where he was appointed a councilor. In December 1915 the National Protection War broke out, Wen joined the National Protection Army against Yuan Shikai. In May 1916 the Military Bureau (軍務院) was established, Wen was appointed Deputy Diplomatic Envoy.

In September 1917 Sun Yat-sen started the Constitutional Protection Movement, and established the Canton Militarist Government. Wen also participated in it, but he supported Cen Chunxuan who was in opposition to Sun. In May 1918 Sun lost the leadership in the Government, when the governmental system was transformed to 7-President System. As Cen got the position of Chief of the Presidents, the disappointed Sun resigned as the President. In April 1920 Wen was appointed Minister for Foreign Affairs by Cen, and in May, also got the position of President. But in November, Cen was defeated by Sun and Chen Jiongming's troops, Wen also retired and hid in Shanghai for over 10 years.

=== In the Reformed Government and the Wang Jingwei regime ===
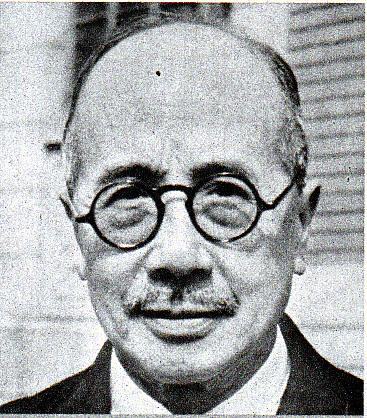
Wen Zongyao (around 1940)

In February 1938 Wen Zongyao was contacted by the Japanese who were invading China, and started to organize the Puppet Government for Japan with Liang Hongzhi. In the next month, they established the Reformed Government of the Republic of China in Nanjing, Wen was appointed Chief of the Legislative Yuan (立法院院長). In March 1940 the Wang Jingwei regime was established, Wen was appointed Chief of the Judicial Yuan (司法院院長), and successively held many important positions.

After Japan unconditionally surrendered and the Wang Jingwei regime collapsed, Wen Zongyao was arrested by the Nationalist Government in Shanghai on September 27, 1945. On July 8, he was sentenced to life imprisonment on the charge of treason (Hanjian).

Wen Zongyao died in prison in Nanjing on November 30, 1947.

== Footnotes ==
- Shao Guihua (邵桂花), Wen Zongyao. Institute of Modern History, the Chinese Academy of Social Sciences (2005). The Biographies of Republic People, Vol.12 民国人物传 第12卷. Zhonghua Book Company. ISBN 7-101-02993-0.
- 中國名人錄 第三版 [Who's Who in China] (in Chinese) (3rd ed.). The China Weekly Review (Shanghai) (上海密勒氏評論報). 1925.
- Xu Youchun (徐友春) (main ed.) (2007). 民国人物大辞典 增订版 [Unabridged Biographical Dictionary of the Republic, Revised and Enlarged Version]. Hebei People's Press (Hebei Renmin Chubanshe; 河北人民出版社). ISBN 978-7-202-03014-1.
- Yu Zidao (余子道) (etc.) (2006). 汪伪政权全史 [The Complete History of Wang's Fake Regime]. Shanghai People's Press (Shanghai Renmin Chubanshe; 上海人民出版社). ISBN 7-208-06486-5.
- Liu Shoulin (刘寿林) (etc. ed.) (1995). 民国职官年表 [The Chronological Table of the Republic's Officer]. Zhonghua Book Company. ISBN 7-101-01320-1.
- Committee for Problems of East Asia (東亜問題調査会) (1941). 最新支那要人伝 [The Biographies of Most Recent Chinese Important People]. Asahi Shimbun.
