= Zhou Fohai =

Chinese politician (1897–1948)

- 周佛海
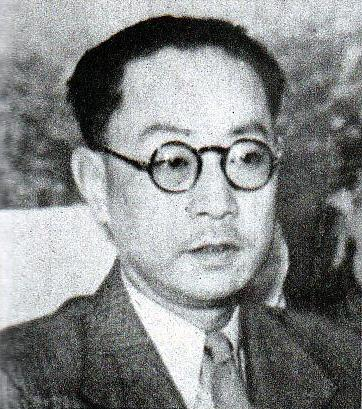
- Zhou in 1940

Vice Premier of the Republic of China (Wang Jingwei regime)
- In office December 1940 – August 1945
- President: Wang Jingwei (1940–1944); Chen Gongbo (1944–1945)
- Preceded by: Chu Minyi
- Succeeded by: Position Abolished

Minister of Finance (Wang Jingwei regime)
- In office March 1940 – August 1945
- Preceded by: Position Established
- Succeeded by: Position Abolished

Mayor of Shanghai
- In office December 1944 – August 1945
- Preceded by: Chen Gongbo
- Succeeded by: K. C. Wu

Personal details
- Born: 29 May 1897 Yuanling County, Hunan, China
- Died: 28 February 1948 (aged 50) Nanjing, Republic of China
- Party: Chinese Communist Party; Kuomintang
- Education: Kyoto Imperial University

Zhou Fohai (Chinese: 周佛海; pinyin: Zhōu Fóhǎi; Wade–Giles: Chou Fo-hai; Hepburn: Shū Futsukai; May 29, 1897 – February 28, 1948) was a Chinese politician and the second-in-command of the Executive Yuan in Wang Jingwei regime government. Zhou also led the CC Clique's branch in Wang's regime.

== Biography ==
Zhou was born in Yuanling County. At ages 17–22, he was sent to study at the Seventh Higher School Zoshikan (the predecessor of Kagoshima University), followed by Kyoto Imperial University. During his stay in Japan, he became attracted to Marxism, and on his return to China, became one of the founders of the Chinese Communist Party (CCP). He attended the First Congress in Shanghai in July 1921, but quit the CCP in 1924 to join the Kuomintang. He was assigned as a secretary to the Public Relations Department of the central government, but maintained strong ties with the party's leftist clique, headed by Wang Jingwei and Liao Zhongkai. He strongly opposed Chiang Kai-shek’s Northern Expedition and Chiang Kai-shek's conduct of the Second Sino-Japanese War.

After Wang Jingwei broke ranks with the Kuomintang during World War II and established the collaborationist Reorganized National Government of the Republic of China, Zhou soon followed. Within the new government, Zhou became Vice Premier, Minister of Finance and had control over part of the Nanjing regime army. He was also Minister of Police (until 1941) and became Mayor of Shanghai after Chen Gongbo in 1944. He also maintained secret contacts with the Nationalists in Chongqing.

According to Jin Xiongbai, editor-in-chief of Zhongbao (中報，Zhou himself was the chairman of which, Zhou's associate Luo Junqiang was the president) and a close associate of Zhou: Zhou was originally a senior leader within the CC Clique and a key ideologue under Chiang Kai-shek, and acted as the head of the CC Clique's Nanjing network and was considered the principal coordinator of political appointments and factional alignments.

Zhou's influence extended over diplomatic, financial, fiscal, military, and intelligence matters, often converging authority in his office even when formal hierarchy placed Chen Gongbo above him.

Jin also recorded Zhou's efforts to manage factional rivalries between the CC Clique and the so-called Mansion Clique, including disputes over personnel appointments. For instance, Zhou reportedly sought to appoint Jin Xiongbai as Deputy Minister of Propaganda and concurrently as president of the Central News Agency, but faced resistance from Mansion Clique figures such as Lin Bosheng, who supported a Japanese-backed candidate, Tang Liangli.

Jin further observed that Zhou was consistently regarded by the Mansion Clique as the de facto leader of the CC Clique. Zhou maintained close personal ties with figures such as Mei Siping (later quit and form his own clique and broke up with Zhou) and Cen Deguang, and relied on trusted associates including Luo Junqiang and his brother-in-law Yang Xinghua. Intelligence officials Ding Mocun and Li Shiqun, both affiliated with the Central Bureau of Investigation and Statistics, were likewise widely perceived as operating within Zhou's political orbit. Jin described recurrent tensions within this network, including rivalry between Ding and Li over the post of Minister of Police Administration. Although Ding possessed greater seniority, Li enjoyed closer relations with Japanese intelligence figure Kenji Doihara. Zhou initially favored Ding, appointing him Minister of Social Affairs while retaining the police portfolio himself. Relations between Zhou and Ding subsequently deteriorated, while Li abruptly declared loyalty to Zhou and was thereafter recommended by him for appointment as Minister of Police Administration and Governor of Jiangsu Province. Jin later claimed that Li's eventual death by poisoning at Japanese hands was connected to Zhou, a view presented as Jin's personal assessment rather than an established historical conclusion.

Between September and October 1939, Zhou personally approved a proposed plan, orchestrated by his close associates Luo Junqiang, to assign ten sworn brothers—each closely allied with him—to vice-ministerial positions across ten government ministries following the formal establishment of the Wang Jingwei regime.

The ten individuals proposed were:

- Yi Ciqian (易次乾)
- Geng Jiaji (耿嘉基)
- Luo Junqiang (羅君強)
- Wang Manyun (汪曼雲)
- Cai Hongtian
- Zhang Zhengfan (章正範)
- Zhou Leshan (周樂山)
- Zhang Zhonghuan (張仲寰)
- Jin Xiongbo (金雄白)
- Dai Ce (戴策)

At the end of World War II, Zhou was captured and taken to Chongqing where he remained in custody for nearly a year. He was then sent to Nanjing in Jiangsu Province where he stood trial for treason due to his wartime roles. At his trial, Zhou argued that, "In the first half of the period when I participated in the Nanjing government, I attempted, by keeping in touch with the enemy, to turn things to the advantage of my country; in the latter half, I tried to turn them against the enemy by maintaining contact with my country [the Chongqing government]." Nonetheless, Zhou was sentenced to death but this was commuted to life imprisonment by Chiang Kai-shek, after his wife had interceded for him. He suffered from heart and stomach problems while in prison and died on February 28, 1948, aged 50.
