= Liñán =

Liñán (Spanish pronunciation: [li'ɲan]) is a Spanish surname.

Notable people with this surname include:

- Álvaro de Maldonado y de Liñán (1890–1963), Spanish diplomat
- Amable Liñán (born 1934), Spanish engineer
- Emilio Sagi Liñán (1900-1951), Spanish footballer
- Felipe Liñán (born 1931), Mexican cyclist
- José Pascual de Liñán y Eguizábal (1858–1934), Spanish writer
- Melchor Liñán y Cisneros (1629-1708), Peruvian archbishop

== See also ==
- Linan
