= Li Shengwu =

Li Shengwu may refer to:

- Li Shengwu (politician) (1899–1985), Chinese diplomat and politician
- Li Shengwu (economist) (born 1985), Singaporean economist at Harvard University
