= Chen Zemin =

Chinese lawyer and politician

- 陳則民
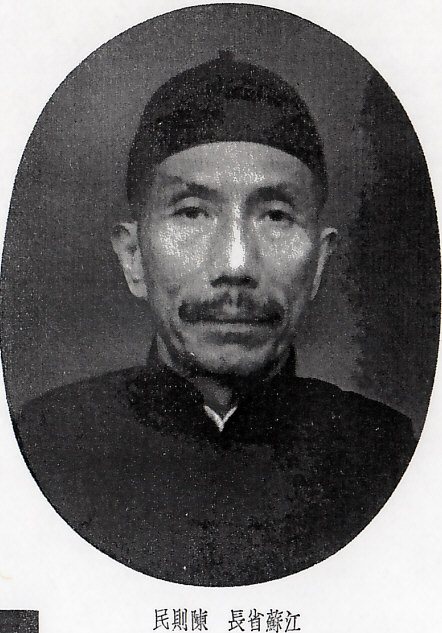
- Chen Zemin in 1940
- Born: 1881; Suzhou, Jiangsu, China
- Died: 1951 (aged 69–70); Suzhou, Jiangu, China
- Education: Nihon University

Chen Zemin (traditional Chinese: 陳則民; simplified Chinese: 陈则民; pinyin: Chén Zémín; Wade–Giles: Ch'ên Tsê-min; Chin Sokumin; 1881–1951) was a lawyer and politician in the pre-war Republic of China. He held a number of important posts in the collaborationist Reformed Government of the Republic of China, and Reorganized National Government of China.

== Biography ==
Chen Zemin was born in Suzhou, Jiangsu Province. He went to study to Japan, and graduated from the Department of Law of Nihon University. After his return to China, he was elected to the Legislative Yuan of the new Nationalist Government and rose to become vice chairman of the political discussion committee. He later served as advisor to the president of the Beiyang government. He then returned to private life, and was chairman of the Suzhou Power Company from 1920 to 1923. He then opened a legal office in Shanghai, and eventually became chairman of the Shanghai Bar Association and chairman of the Shanghai Chamber of Commerce and other posts.

Soon after the start of the Second Sino-Japanese War, Suzhou came under Japanese occupation. Chen Zemin agreed to serve as chairman of the Suzhou Regional Administration under the Japanese, and from March 1938 joined the Reformed Government of the Republic of China, initially as chief of the Education Bureau until April 1938, and as governor of Jiangsu Province from April 1938 to March 1940. In March 1940, when the Reorganized National Government of China led by Wang Jingwei was established, Chen Zemin was re-appointed governor of Jiangsu Province, continuing to hold that post until June 1940.

Following the defeat of Japan, he was arrested by Chiang Kai-shek's Nationalist government and remained in custody in Suzhou after the city fell to the Chinese Communist Party. He died in prison in 1951 at the age of 71.
