= Ren Yuandao =

Chinese general and traitor

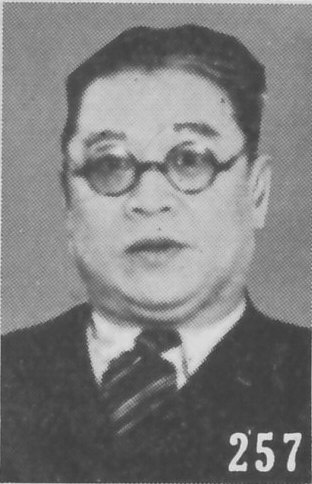
Ren Yuandao as pictured in The Most Recent Biographies of Chinese Dignitaries

Ren Yuandao (Chinese: 任援道; pinyin: Rén Yuándào; Wade–Giles: Jen Yüan-tao, 1890–1980) was a Chinese general of the Republic of China, who held military posts in the collaborationist Reformed Government of the Republic of China and later the Wang Jingwei Government during the Second Sino-Japanese War.

== Biography ==
Ren Yuandao was born in the Jiangsu Province during the late Qing dynasty. He joined the Beiyang Army and studied a military academy in Japan before the Xinhai Revolution broke out in 1911. Ren later served in the National Revolutionary Army and also held some administrative positions in the Nationalist government. He commanded the garrison in the Beijing-Tianjin area during the 1930s, and after gathering 10,000 men and three torpedo boats, he defected to the pro-Japanese Reformed Government of the Republic of China under Liang Hongzhi. Despite joining Wang Jingwei's Reorganized National Government in Nanjing in 1939–40, Ren maintained contacts with the Nationalist intelligence agency and provided them with information. During his time with the Wang Jingwei regime he held the post of Minister of the Navy from 1940 to 1945 (acting, 1940–42). He was also a member of the National Military Council (1940–42) and the governor of the Jiangsu Province (1944–45).

His forces were organized as the 1st Front Army, and consisted of about 20,000 men. They were considered to be some of the Nanjing regime's most reliable troops.

After the war, he fled to British Hong Kong, and later escaped to Canada in 1949. Ren died there in 1980.

== Sources ==
=== Literature ===
- Barret, David. Chinese Collaboration with Japan, 1932-1945: The Limits of Accommodation. Stanford University Press, 2002.
