= Li Fang =

Li Fang may refer to:

- Li Fang (Song dynasty) (925–996), Song dynasty scholar-official and editor
- Li Fang (tennis) (born 1973), Chinese female tennis player
- Li Fang (footballer) (born 1993), Chinese male association footballer
- Li Fang (badminton), Chinese gold medalist at the 1978 WBF World Championships
- Li Fang (diplomat) (born 1895), Chinese diplomat
