= Shao Wenkai =

Chinese army general and Governor of Henan

Shao Wenkai (simplified Chinese: 邵文凯; traditional Chinese: 邵文凱; pinyin: Shào Wénkǎi; Wade–Giles: Shao Wen-k'ai; 1887–????) was a member of the military in the Republic of China. He belonged to the Fengtian clique, later he became important during the Wang Jingwei regime. His courtesy name was Zhongze (仲則). He was born in Liaoyang, Liaoning.

== Biography ==
In 1919 Shao Wenkai graduated from the Three Northeast Military Academy's (東三省講武堂) Department of Infantry in the 5th period. In 1927 he was appointed Chief of Staff of the 8th Army of the Northeast Army. In the next year he was promoted to acting Commander of the 27th Brigade of the North East Army. In 1931 he was appointed Vice-Provost Marshal of Northeast and Chief Martial Law Administrator in Beiping (Peking). In 1936 he became corresponding lieutenant general.

Later Shao Wenkai participated in the Wang Jingwei regime. In May 1944 he was appointed Governor of Henan. He served in that post until the following May, when he was appointed a member of the Military Commission.

After the Wang Jingwei regime collapsed, Shao Wenkai was arrested by Chiang Kai-shek's National Government. He was convicted of treason and surrender to the enemy (namely Hanjian) and sentenced to death by a military tribunal, but his fate remains unknown.

== Footnotes ==
- Xu Youchun (徐友春) (main ed.) (2007). Unabridged Biographical Dictionary of the Republic, Revised and Enlarged Version (民国人物大辞典 增订版). Hebei People's Press (Hebei Renmin Chubanshe; 河北人民出版社). ISBN 978-7-202-03014-1.
- Yu Zidao (余子道) (etc.) (2006). The Complete History of Wang's Fake Regime (汪伪政权全史). Shanghai People's Press (Shanghai Renmin Chubanshe; 上海人民出版社). ISBN 7-208-06486-5.
- Liu Shoulin (刘寿林) (etc.ed.) (1995). The Chronological Table of the Republic's Officer (民国职官年表). Zhonghua Book Company. ISBN 7-101-01320-1.
