= Zhou Huaren =

Chinese politician (1903–1976)

- 周化人
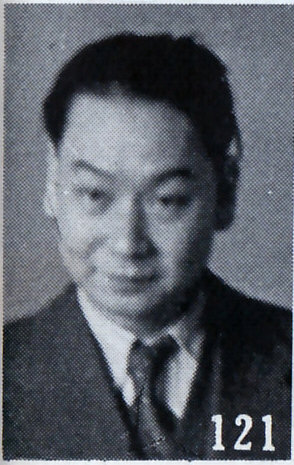
- Huaren as pictured in The Most Recent Biographies of Chinese Dignitaries

Personal details
- Born: 1903 Gaozhou, Guangdong, Qing dynasty
- Died: 1976 (aged 72–73) Hong Kong

Chinese name
- Chinese: 周化人
Transcriptions
Standard Mandarin
- Hanyu Pinyin: Zhōu Huàrén
- Bopomofo: ㄓㄡㄏㄨㄚˋㄖㄣˊ
- Wade–Giles: Chou^{1} Hua^{4}-jen^{2}
Yue: Cantonese
- Jyutping: Zau^{1} Faa^{3}-jan^{4}

Zhou Huaren (traditional Chinese: 周化人; simplified Chinese: 周化人; Pinyin: Zhōu Huàrén; Wade–Giles: Chou Hua-jen) (1903 – 1976) was a politician in the Republic of China. He was one of the leading ideologues in the Wang Jingwei regime.

== Biography ==
In 1925, Zhou Huaren entered the University of China in Beijing. In 1929 he entered Beiping University (now Peking University), where he studied under Gu Mengyu, a leader of the Kuomintang's Leftists. Gu introduced Zhou to Wang Jingwei, and in 1933 Zhou was appointed Vice-Chief of the Management Bureau for Jinpu railway on Wang's recommendation. In 1935 Zhou went to the United Kingdom and studied at London University.

In September 1939, Zhou Huaren became involved in Wang Jingwei's faction, and was appointed Vice-Chief of the Bureau for Organization, Kuomintang (Wang's clique). He attended political planning sessions in Beiping (Peking), Shanghai and Hong Kong. In March 1940, the Wang Jingwei Regime was established, with Zhou appointed as the Executive Vice-Minister for Railways.

In the following October, Zhou Huaren was appointed as a Member of the Committee for the Guangdong Provincial Government and the Mayor of Guangzhou Special Municipality. He served in this position until June 1942. In January 1943, he was appointed a Member of the National Economic Committee. In the following July, he was transferred to the Administrative Superintendency of the 1st District in Shanghai Special Municipality (上海特別市第1区行政督察専員).

Just before the collapse of the Wang Jingwei Regime, Zhou Huaren escaped to Jilin. After the Wang Jingwei regime had collapsed, he was arrested by Chiang Kai-shek's National Government, and was imprisoned at Shanghai. But for some reason, he was released and fled to Hong Kong.

In 1976, Zhou Huaren died from an unknown illness in Hong Kong.

== Ideology ==
Zhou was one of the principal ideologues of the Wang Jingwei regime and an active proponent of Asianism. He articulated what he termed an outline of Great Asianism, drawing on Sun Yat-sen’s advocacy of Sino–Japanese cooperation and the concept of wangdao (the moral way of kingship) to construct an ideological justification for the regime. Zhou argued that Asia’s political subjugation and perceived civilizational decline stemmed from the abandonment of its own moral and cultural foundations, which he identified as the tradition of wangdao in contrast to Western power politics (badao). According to Zhou, Sun Yat-sen had already identified wangdao as the ethical core of Asian civilization, fundamentally distinct from Western political thought, and it therefore fell to the Wang Jingwei regime to demonstrate this principle in practice.

Within this framework, Zhou maintained that the ongoing conflict with Britain and the United States should be understood as a racial and civilizational struggle, rather than a conventional interstate war.

Zhou further developed these arguments in his writings for the journal Great Asianism, where he linked racial essentialism to Sun Yat-sen’s dichotomy between wangdao and badao. In a series of articles, he outlined what he described as the history of white people, imperial expansion in Asia, examining the political conditions of individual Asian societies to argue that Asian peoples shared a common experience of victimization. Zhou concluded that cooperation between China and Japan, institutionalized through an East Asian alliance, constituted the only viable means of reversing Asia’s subordinate position in the international order.

== Footnotes ==
- The Editorial Committee of the Gazette of Huazhou City (1996). The Gazette of Huazhou County (化州县志). Guangdong People's Press (Guangdong Renmin Chubanshe; 广东人民出版社). ISBN 7-218-00797-X.
- Xu Youchun (徐友春) (main ed.) (2007). Unabridged Biographical Dictionary of the Republic, Revised and Enlarged Version (民国人物大辞典 增订版). Hebei People's Press (Hebei Renmin Chubanshe; 河北人民出版社). ISBN 978-7-202-03014-1.
- History of Prison in Shanghai (上海监狱志) The Office of Shanghai’s History (上海地方志办公室) Website
- Liu Shoulin (刘寿林) (etc.ed.) (1995). The Chronological Table of the Republic's Officer (民国职官年表). Zhonghua Book Company (Zhonghua Shuju; 中华书局). ISBN 7-101-01320-1.
- The Biographies of Most Recent Chinese Important People (最新支那要人伝). Asahi Shimbun. 1941.
