= Chu Minyi =

Chinese politician

Chu Minyi 褚民谊
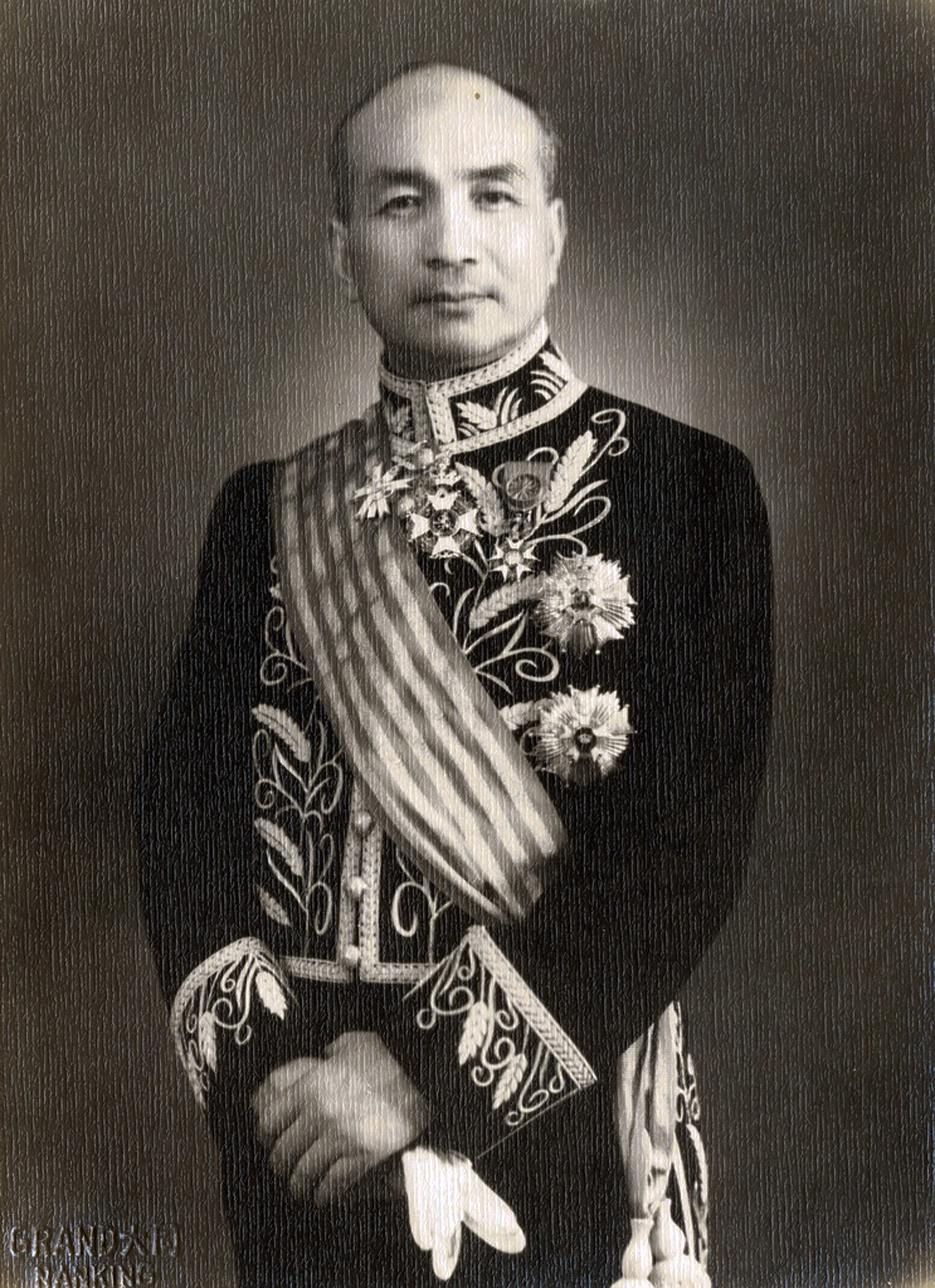

Minister of Foreign Affairs (Wang Jingwei Government)
- In office March 1940 – December 1940
- President: Wang Jingwei
- Preceded by: Position established
- Succeeded by: Xu Liang
- In office October 1941 – April 1945
- President: Wang Jingwei; Chen Gongbo
- Preceded by: Xu Liang
- Succeeded by: Li Shengwu

Personal details
- Born: 1884 Wuxing District, Zhejiang, Qing Dynasty
- Died: August 23, 1946 (aged 61–62) Suzhou, Jiangsu, Republic of China
- Party: Kuomintang
- Education: Free University of Brussels (1834-1969), University of Strasbourg
- Profession: physician, educator, politician

Chu Minyi (Chinese: 褚民誼; pinyin: Chǔ Mínyì; Hepburn: Cho Mingi; 1884 – August 23, 1946) was a leading figure in the Chinese republican movement and early Nationalist government, later noted for his role as Minister of Foreign Affairs in the collaborationist Wang Jingwei Government during World War II.

== Biography ==
Chu was born into a family of Scholar-bureaucrats in the Wuxing District of Zhejiang Province in the late Qing dynasty. His father was a noted physician. Chu Minyi was sent to Japan in 1903, where he studied economics and politics. In 1906, together with Zhang Jingjiang, he departed Japan for further studies in France, joining the Tongmenghui dedicated to overthrowing the Qing Dynasty, when their ship stopped in Singapore. While in France, he joined the group of Paris Chinese anarchists, such as Li Shizeng and Cai Yuanpei, whom he assisted in printing propaganda leaflets supporting the republican movement.

In November 1911, after the start of the Xinhai Revolution, he returned to Shanghai, where he became local leader of the Tongmenghui movement in the city. However, he disagreed with Song Jiaoren over the establishment of the Kuomintang, and left China for Belgium, where he earned degrees in medicine and pharmacology at the Free University of Brussels, but he never went into medical practice. He returned briefly to China in 1915 to oppose Yuan Shikai's attempt to establish a new Chinese Empire, but soon returned to Europe. In 1921, he became the Vice President of the Institut Franco-Chinois which Li Shizeng had founded at the University of Lyons and held the post for a year. In 1922 he moved to Strasbourg, and received his doctorate from the University of Strasbourg in 1925.

In 1925, on the death of Sun Yat-sen, Chu returned to China and became a member of the Kuomintang educational commission and the head of the medical school at the Guangdong University. He also became a member of the Central Executive Committee of the Kuomintang in 1926. As a Kuomintang Committee member, he organized the Chinese Arts Association, served as the Chairman of the Commission for the Establishment of National Hygiene and represented China in European countries in the early 1930s. However, due to various political differences with Chiang Kai-shek, he resigned his positions.

Chu was in Shanghai during the Battle of Shanghai in 1937, remaining in that city during the Japanese takeover. However, when his brother-in-law Wang Jingwei broke ranks with the Kuomintang and established the collaborationist Wang Jingwei Government, Chu accepted the post of Vice President of the Executive Yuan and Foreign Minister in 1940. There was a byword describing the main members of Wang Jingwei's government. "Chen Gongbo's mouth, Zhou Fohai's pen and Chu Minyi's legs."

As the Foreign Minister, he negotiated the November 30, 1940 treaty in which Tokyo accorded formal diplomatic recognition to the Wang Jingwei Government and worked to secure diplomatic recognition by the Axis powers by the end of 1941. He was awarded the Order of the Rising Sun (1st class) by Emperor Hirohito. Chu became the ambassador of the collaborationist Chinese government to Japan briefly before becoming the Foreign Minister again until the final months of the war, and continued to pay an important role in the Wang Jingwei Government until the end of World War II.

In 1945, after the surrender of Japan, Chu was taken into custody by the Republic of China government in Guangdong, where he served as governor, in August 1945. He was brought to trial in Nanjing on charges of treason in April 1946. There was considerable public sympathy for Chu at the time of his trial for many people found it hard to consider Chu as a national traitor due his record as a Chinese nationalist. Many people considered his wartime role as a result of his personal loyalty to Wang Jingwei. Nevertheless, Chu was found guilty of treason and executed at Suzhou on August 23, 1946. His last words were "I am not ashamed for my living, yet my death will make more value. My body should be sent to the hospital to assist the study on medicine."
