= Lin Biao (born 1889) =

Politician, judge and lawyer in the Republic of China

- 林彪
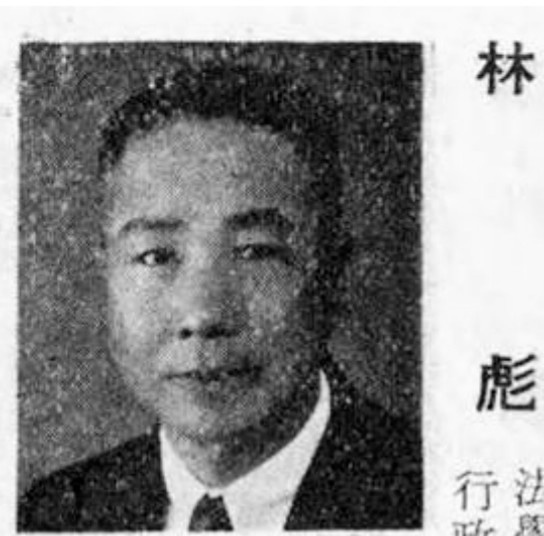
- Lin c. 1940

Personal details
- Born: 1889 Xiangshan, Guangdong, Qing Dynasty
- Died: Unknown

Chinese name
- Chinese: 林彪
Transcriptions
Standard Mandarin
- Hanyu Pinyin: Lín Biāo
- Wade–Giles: Lin^{2} Piao^{1}
Yue: Cantonese
- Jyutping: Lam^{4} Biu^{1}

Courtesy name
- Traditional Chinese: 禮源
- Simplified Chinese: 礼源
Transcriptions
Standard Mandarin
- Hanyu Pinyin: Lǐ Yuán
- Wade–Giles: Li^{3} Yüan^{2}
Yue: Cantonese
- Jyutping: Lai^{5} Jyun^{4}

Lin Biao (Chinese: 林彪; pinyin: Lín Biāo; 1889-?) was a politician, judge and lawyer in the Republic of China. He was an important person in the Wang Jingwei regime (Republic of China-Nanjing). His courtesy name was Liyuan (禮源). He was born in Xiangshan (Zhongshan), Guangdong, Qing dynasty.

== Biography ==
First, Lin Biao went to study to Belgium, secondly he went to the United States, and graduated from University of Wisconsin. Then he went to Germany, and acquired Doctor of Laws, University of Würzburg. In 1923, he returned home, joined Sun Yat-sen's Guangzhou Military Government, and appointed to a secretary of the Generalissimo's office. He successively held the staff of the Legation to Germany, a lecturer of the Peking University, and a judge of the Shanghai Special Court. In 1928, Lin was appointed to a secretary of Judicial Yuan, and next April, was transferred to the acting Chief of the Jiangsu High Court. In 1934, he resigned it, and was an established lawyer in Suzhou.

In May 1940, when the Wang Jingwei regime was established, Lin Biao was appointed to the Chief of the Administrative Court. In 1945, he also was a member of the committee for abolition of extraterritorial rights.

Since the collapse of the Wang Jingwei regime, the whereabouts of Lin Biao have been unknown.

== Alma mater ==
University of Wisconsin
University of Würzburg
