= Gu Zhongchen =

- 顧忠琛
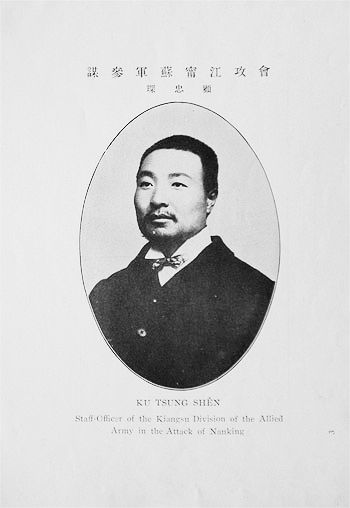
- Born: 1880; Wuxi, Jiangsu, China
- Died: July 31, 1945 (aged 64–65); China

Gu Zhongchen (traditional Chinese: 顧忠琛; simplified Chinese: 顾忠琛; pinyin: Gù Zhōngchēn; Wade–Giles: Ku Chung-ch'en; Hepburn: Ko Chōchin; 1880 – July 31, 1945), courtesy name Yangwu (養捂), was a military leader and politician at the end of Qing dynasty and in the early Republic of China.

== Biography ==
Gu Zhongchen was born in Wuxi, Jiangsu. By the end of the Qing dynasty, he was Commandant of the Anhui Military Academy. However, a number of his cadets, including Bai Wenwei (柏文蔚), entered the pro-republican Tongmenghui movement, so he came under suspicion by imperial authorities and was demoted to a trifling job in Nanjing. During the Xinhai Revolution of 1911 that overthrew the Qing dynasty, Gu Zhongchen participated with the Tongmenghui as the General Councilor of the Jiangsu–Zhejiang United Army. In May 1924, he was appointed to the Commander of the 4th Army of the Northern Expedition Force commanded by Sun Yat-sen.

In March 1940, Gu Zhongchen was appointed to the Vice-Chief of the Examination Yuan within the collaborationist Reorganized National Government of China under Wang Jingwei. In November 1944, he promoted to the Chief of the Examination Yuan.

Gu Zhongchen died on July 31, 1945, at the age of 66, shortly before the surrender of Japan.
