= Linan =

Linan or Lin'an may refer to the following locations in China:

- Hangzhou (Chinese: 杭州), formerly named Lin'an (临安) in the Song dynasty
  - Lin'an District (临安区), a district of Hangzhou, Zhejiang

== Towns and Townships ==
- Linan, Fujian, a town in Xianyou County, Fujian
- Linan, Hunan (澧南), a town in Li County, Hunan
- Lin'an, Yunnan (临安), a town in Jianshui County, Yunnan
- Linan Township (里南乡), a township in Shengzhou, Zhejiang

== See also ==
- Liñán, Spanish surname
