= Kumataro Honda =

Japanese diplomat

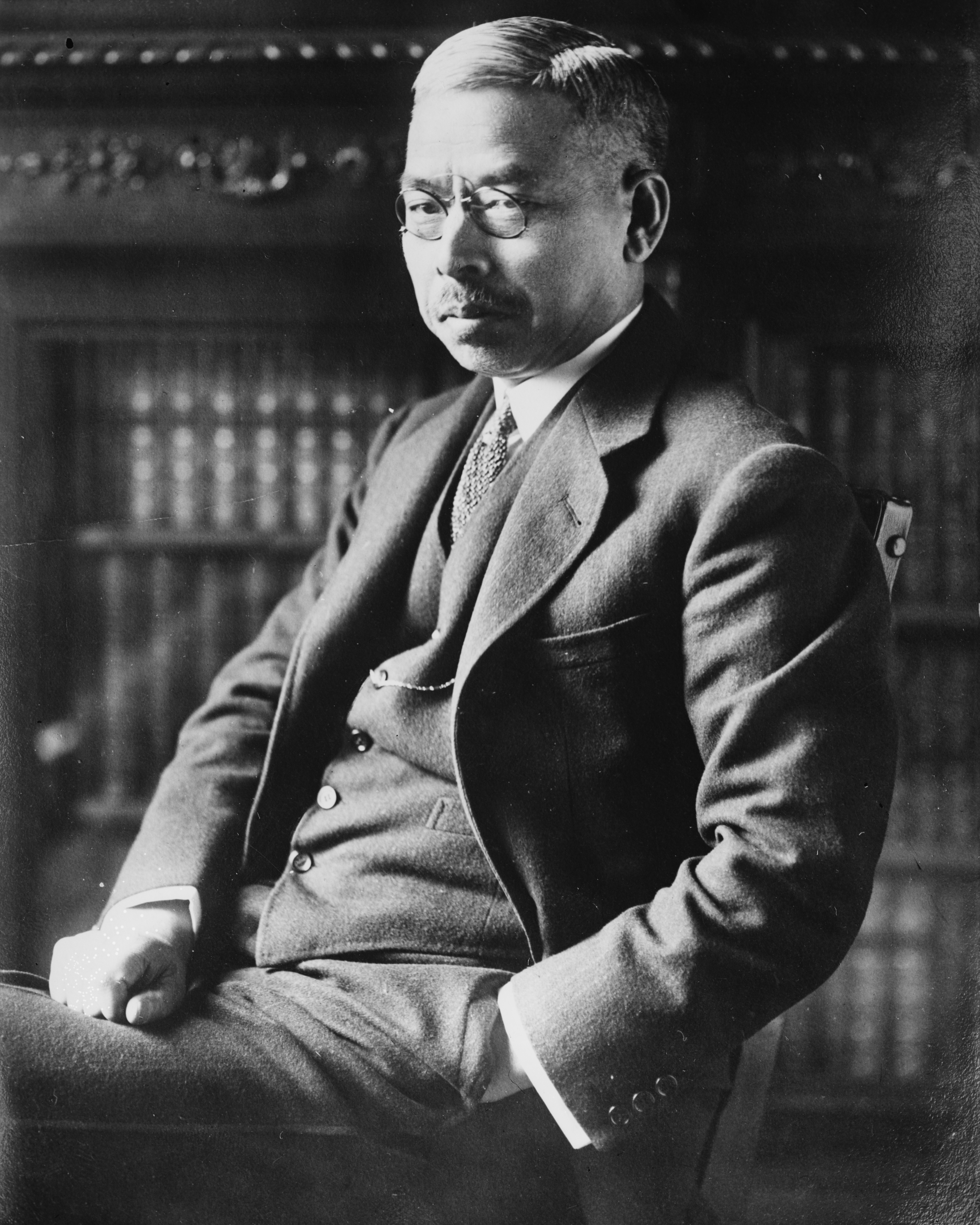
Kumataro Honda

Kumataro Honda (Japanese: 本多 熊太郎) (1874–1948) was a Japanese diplomat. He served as the Japanese ambassador to Germany, with inaugural date of February 6, 1924. He later replaced Nobuyuki Abe, serving as the Japanese ambassador in Nanjing from 1940 to 1941 for the Wang Jingwei regime within the Republic of China. He resigned in December 1941 because of health issues and was succeeded by Mamoru Shigemitsu.
