= Li Fang (diplomat) =

Chinese diplomat

Li Fang (Chinese: 李芳; 1895—?) was a Chinese diplomat in the early Republic of China who later joined the pro-Japanese Reorganized National Government of China under Wang Jingwei, serving as its minister in Romania and Hungary. As a commercial attaché in Berlin in 1941, he briefly served as the Nanjing regime's interim ambassador to Germany before the arrival of Li Shengwu.
