= Zhao Yusong =

Chinese journalist and politician (1897–1971)

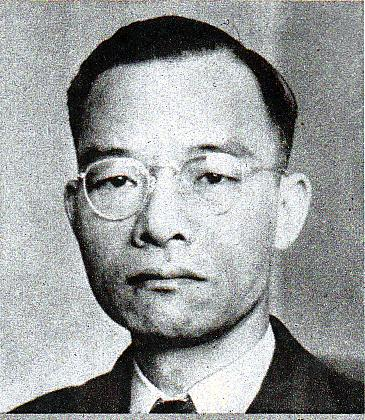
A picture of Yusong from The Most Recent Biographies of Chinese Dignitaries #203

Zhao Yusong (Chinese: 趙毓松) (Wades-Giles: Chao Yüsung) (December 26, 1897 – November 18, 1971) was a journalist and politician of the Republic of China. He was born in Guizhou. He served as in the collaborationist government of Wang Jingwei in Nanjing. After the downfall of Wang's government in August 1945, Zhao fled to Hong Kong. In September 1971, Zhao attempted suicide in Tokyo to protest Richard Nixon's upcoming visit to China. Although he survived the initial attempt, his health deteriorated and he died in Tokyo in November 1971.

Preceded by New office	Minister of Agriculture; March 1940 – August 1941	Succeeded by Mei Siping
Preceded by Li Shengwu	Minister of Justice (Wang Jingwei government); August 1941 – March 1942	Succeeded by Luo Junqiang
Preceded by Jiang Kanghu	Minister of Civil Service; March 1942 – August 1943	Succeeded by Shen Erqiao

== Bibliography ==
- 松本益雄・古沢敏雄 (1978). 迎春花－趙毓松の中国革命回顧録|和書. 明徳出版社.
- 徐友春主編 (2007). 民国人物大辞典 増訂版|和書. 河北人民出版社. ISBN 978-7-202-03014-1.
- 劉寿林ほか編 (1995). 民国職官年表|和書. 中華書局. ISBN 7-101-01320-1.
- 最新支那要人伝|和書. 朝日新聞社. 1941.
