= Tang Liangli =

Chinese journalist and businessman (1901–1975)

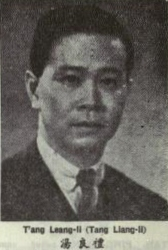
Tang Liangli

Tang Liangli (traditional Chinese: 湯良禮; simplified Chinese: 汤良礼; pinyin: Tāng Liánglǐ, also T'ang Leang-Li or Thung Liang Lee; 1901–1975) was a journalist and politician in the Republic of China. He was an important politician during the Wang Jingwei regime (Republic of China-Nanjing). He was an overseas Chinese who was born in Java, Indonesia, and whose family place of origin was Fujian. His Indonesian name was Tubagus Pranata Tirtawidjaya.

== Biography ==
=== Journalist ===
Tang Liangli spoke English better than Chinese. He studied at London University and Vienna University. In 1925 he acquired a B.Sc (Economics), from London University, and was recommended as a member of the Royal Economic Society.

In 1929, Tang was appointed chief of the Communications Office to Europe, Central Executive Committee, Kuomintang (中國國民黨中央執行委員會駐歐通訊主任). The next year, he returned to China and became Wang Jingwei's private secretary and a reporter for several foreign presses, including The New York Times, The Daily News (London), The Batavia Newspaper, and the news agency of the Social Democratic Party of Germany. He was also appointed president of Lianhua Shubao (聯華書報) and general editor of The People's Tribune: A Journal of Fact and Opinion about China and Other Countries (China United Press, 1931-1942).

In 1931, Zhou Enlai who managed the central leading authority of the Chinese Communist Party in Shanghai, was pressured heavily by the Kuomintang. At that time, Tang hid Zhou from the Kuomintang authorities, and with the assistance of a Western friend, enabled Zhou's escape from Shanghai.

In 1933, Tang was appointed as an adviser to the Foreign Ministry, National Government, with minister extraordinary and plenipotentiary status. After that he became a general editor of the "China Today" Series and the English Encyclopedia of Modern China. During that time, he wrote extensively in English, with many of his works becoming influential both inside and outside China. Among these are, The New Currency System in China (1937), which was referred to by Milton Friedman.

=== In the Wang Jingwei regime ===
In March 1940, when the Wang Jingwei regime was established, Tang assumed formal office in the regime. In August of the same year, he was appointed director of the International Publicity Bureau (國際宣傳局局長), remaining at this post until the collapse of the regime following Japan's surrender in 1945. From May to August 1941 he also held the post of Policy Affairs Vice-Minister for the Foreign Affairs Ministry.

After the Wang Jingwei regime had collapsed, Tang was arrested by Chiang Kai-shek's National Government; however, for unknown reasons, he was soon released. In 1949, he returned to Indonesia and lived in Jakarta. He participated in editing The Indonesian Review of International Affairs, and was interviewed by Japanese political scientist Tatsuo Yamada (who specialized in Chinese politics) on December 17, 1969.

Tang Liangli died in 1975.

== Works ==
- China in Revolt (London, 1927. German ed. 1930)
- The Foundation of Modern China (London, 1928. Malay ed. Batavia, 1930)
- The Inner History of the Chinese Revolution (London & New York, 1930)
- Wang Ching-wei: A Political Biography (Tientsin, 1931)
- Suppressing Communist Banditry in China (China United Press (Shanghai), 1934, "China Today" series, 1)
- Reconstruction in China : A Record of Progress and Achievement in Facts and Figures (China United Press (Shanghai)(Shanghai), 1934, "China Today" series, 3)
- The Puppet State of Manchukuo (China United Press (Shanghai), 1935, "China Today" series, 4)
- The New Social Order in China (China United Press (Shanghai), 1936, "China Today" series, 6)
- China Facts and Fancies (China United Press (Shanghai), 1936, "China Today" series, 7)
- China's New Currency System (China United Press (Shanghai), 1936, "China Today" series, 8)
- The New Currency System in China (中國新貨幣係統), 1937)
- Tomizou Nakayama (translator), The Organizations and Prospects of Chinese Society, A Guidepost for New China (中山菟美三訳『支那社会の組織と展望 新支那建設の一指標』), Ikuseisya (育生社), 1940.
- 《中日兩國為友是自然的敵是不自然的》, 國民外交討論會, 1941
- American Imperialism in China (《美帝國主義在中國》）中華日報社（上海）, 1943 (Chinese Version, 1944年)
- 《和平論叢》國民外交討論會, published year was unknown.
- Tatsuo Yamada (translator), Wang Jingwei - A Peaceful Warrior in Eastern Asia (山田辰雄訳「汪精衛 - 東アジアにおける平和の戦士」)『法学研究』慶應義塾大学法学研究会, Vol.45, No.10, October, 1972.

== Alma mater ==
- University of London
- University of Vienna

== Footnotes ==
- Liang Jie (梁捷), "Friedman and the Issue of the Chinese Currency" (弗里德曼与中国货币问题), November 20, 2006 People's Daily Online (人民网)
- Tatsuo Yamada (山田辰雄), "Interview from T'ang Leang-Li" (湯良礼訪問記), 『法学研究』Keio University, Vol.45, No.10, October, 1972
- Lawrence Kessler,"Reconstructing Zhou Enlai's Escape from Shanghai in 1931: A Research Note," Twentieth-Century China, Volume 34, Number 2, 2008.
- Zhai Yaliu (翟亞柳), "A Foreigner who let Zhou Enlai escape from Shanghai in 1931," (1931年帮助周恩来上海脱险的一位外国人)」 Bainianshu(百年树), Number 9, 2010.
- Xu Youchun (徐友春) (main ed.) (2007). Unabridged Biographical Dictionary of the Republic, Revised and Enlarged Version (民国人物大辞典 增订版). Hebei People's Press (Hebei Renmin Chubanshe; 河北人民出版社). ISBN 978-7-202-03014-1.
- The Biographies of Most Recent Chinese Important People (最新支那要人伝). Asahi Shimbun. 1941.
- Liu Shoulin (刘寿林) (etc.ed.) (1995). The Chronological Table of the Republic's Officer (民国职官年表). Zhonghua Book Company. ISBN 7-101-01320-1.
- History of Prison in Shanghai (上海监狱志) The Office of Shanghai’s History (上海地方志办公室) Website
- Leo Suryadinata (etc ed.) (2012). Southeast Asian personalities of Chinese descent: a biographical dictionary v.1. Institute of Southeast Asian Studies. ISBN 978-9814345217.
