= Álvaro de Maldonado y de Liñán =

Spanish diplomat and 2nd Count of Galiana (1890–1963)

Álvaro de Maldonado Liñán, 2nd Count of Galiana (1890–1963) was a Spanish diplomat known for being the Spanish minister in China from 1941 to 1943. He served as the consul general in Shanghai (the holder of that office also doubled as Spain's minister plenipotentiary to China) accredited to the Reorganized National Government of China under Wang Jingwei, a Japanese puppet state. He replaced Pedro de Igual y Martinez-Daban, the consul until 1940, as the latter was more pro-Chiang Kai-shek and Maldonado was considered to be more aligned with Axis policies. However, he himself got into some conflict with some businessmen so he was replaced in 1943 with José González de Gregorio, the former commercial consul in Beijing who had been accredited to Manchukuo. Maldonado retired in 1960.

Diplomatic posts
Preceded by Pedro de Igual y Martinez-Daban	Spanish Minister Plenipotentiary to China (Nanjing regime); 1941–1943	Succeeded by José González de Gregorio (chargé d'affaires)
