= Zhang Tao =

Zhang Tao may refer to:

- Zhang Tao (Water Margin), character in Water Margin
- Zhang Tao (chemist) (born 1963), Chinese chemist
