= Zhao Zhengping =

Chinese politician

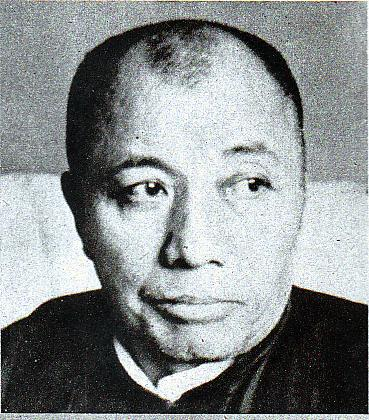
Zhao c. 1940

Zhao Zhengping (Wade–Giles: Chao Cheng-p'ing; 1878–1945) was a politician of the Republic of China.

== Biography ==
He was born in Shanghai. As a member of the Tongmenghui, he participated in the Xinhai Revolution. In 1939, Zhao left Hong Kong to meet with Wang Jingwei. With the creation of Wang's government in March 1940, Zhao served as minister. After the downfall of Wang's government in August 1945, he committed suicide in Zhenhai District, Ningbo, Zhejiang after being charged with the crime of hanjian.

== Bibliography ==
- 鄭仁佳「趙正平小伝」「伝記文学」ホームページ（台湾、要繁体字フォント）
- 徐友春主編 (2007). 民国人物大辞典 増訂版|和書. 河北人民出版社. ISBN 978-7-202-03014-1.
- 劉寿林ほか編 (1995). 民国職官年表|和書. Zhonghua Book Company. ISBN 7-101-01320-1.
- 最新支那要人伝|和書. 1941.

Political offices
Preceded by New office	Minister of Education; March 1940 – August 1941	Succeeded by Li Shengwu
