= Lin Bosheng =

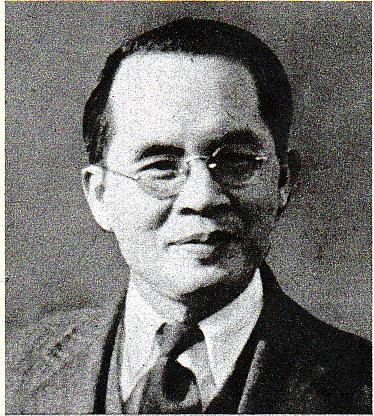

Lin Baisheng (Chinese: 林柏生) (Wades-Giles: Lin Po-sheng) (1902 – October 8, 1946) was a politician of the Republic of China. He was born in Maoming, Guangdong. He was executed in Nanjing for collaboration with the Empire of Japan.

Preceded by New office	Propaganda Minister (Nanjing Nationalist Government); March 1940 – December 1944	Succeeded by Zhao Zunyue
Preceded by Luo Junqiang	Governor of Anhui; December 1944 – August 1945	Succeeded by office abolished

== Bibliography ==
- 徐友春主編 (2007). 民国人物大辞典 増訂版|和書. 河北人民出版社. ISBN 978-7-202-03014-1.
- 劉寿林ほか編 (1995). 民国職官年表|和書. Zhonghua Book Company. ISBN 7-101-01320-1.
- 劉傑 (2000). 漢奸裁判 対日協力者を襲った運命|和書. Chuokoron-Shinsha. ISBN 4-12-101544-4.
