= Li Shengwu (politician) =

Chinese politician and diplomat

Li Shengwu 李聖五
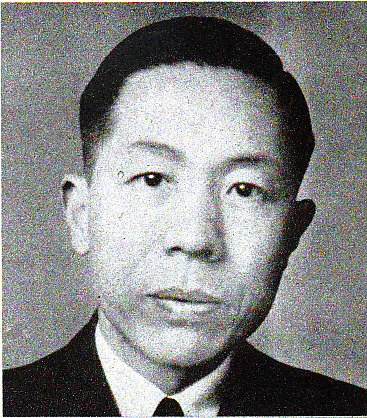

Minister of Foreign Affairs (Wang Jingwei Government)
- In office March – August 1945
- President: Chen Gongbo
- Preceded by: Chu Minyi
- Succeeded by: Position abolished

Personal details
- Born: 1899 Tai'an, Shandong Province, Qing Dynasty
- Died: 1985 (aged 85-86) Jiamusi, Heilongjiang Province, People's Republic of China
- Party: Kuomintang
- Education: Peking University; University of Oxford; Tokyo Imperial University
- Profession: Lawyer, diplomat, politician

Li Shengwu (Chinese: 李聖五; pinyin: Lǐ Shèngwǔ; Wade–Giles: Li Sheng-wu, 1899–1985) was a Chinese politician and diplomat of the Republic of China who later became an important figure of the Wang Jingwei Government of Wang Jingwei.

== Biography ==
He was born in Tai'an, Shandong Province, during the late Qing Dynasty. Li graduated from the law school at Peking National University and later studied abroad in Japan, at the law school of Tokyo Imperial University, and at Oxford University in the UK. He became a professor at Fudan University upon returning to China. In 1932, Li started working for the Nationalist government and in December of that year he served as a member of the Ministry of Foreign Affairs chief administrative office. In 1935, he joined the Hong Kong Institute of International Affairs. It was at that time that Li became acquainted with Wang Jingwei. In June 1937 he returned to work in the foreign ministry.

In 1940, Li joined the Japanese-sponsored Reorganized National Government of China, led by Wang, as a high-ranking official of the judicial department and a member of the Kuomintang (Wang Jingwei faction) central committee. He was also appointed to various other government committees. In September 1941 he was appointed as the ambassador to Germany. In 1942, he was also made as minister to Denmark in addition to his role as the ambassador to Germany, but was unable to travel to either country to take up his posts. In April 1945, he was named the Minister of Foreign Affairs and appointed to various other government bodies.

Following the defeat of Japan in August 1945, he was arrested by Chiang Kai-shek's government and imprisoned in Nanjing. In 1947 he received a sentence of 15 years in prison. However, Li was later released and retired in Hong Kong, where he taught law and Chinese literature. From 1984, he lived in Jiamusi, in the People's Republic of China, with his eldest daughter. Li died in 1985.

== Sources ==
- Xu Xiang. People Dictionary of Korea Revised Edition. Hebei People's Publishing Company, 2007. ISBN 978-7-202-03014-1.
- Yu Zidao (余子道) (etc.) (2006). The Complete History of Wang's Fake Regime (汪伪政权全史). Shanghai People's Press (Shanghai Renmin Chubanshe; 上海人民出版社). ISBN 7-208-06486-5.
- Liu Shoulin (刘寿林) (etc.ed.) (1995). The Chronological Table of the Republic's Officer (民国职官年表). Zhonghua Book Company. ISBN 7-101-01320-1.

Government offices
Preceded by Position established	Minister of Justice; March 1940 – August 1941	Succeeded by Zhao Yusong
Preceded by Zhao Zhengping	Minister of Education; August 1941 – February 1944	Succeeded by Chen Chunpu
Preceded by Chu Minyi	Minister of Foreign Affairs; March – August 1945	Succeeded by Position abolished
