= Reformed Government of the Republic of China =

Puppet government controlled by Japan

Reformed Government of the Republic of China: 中華民國維新政府 (Chinese); 中華民國維新政府 (Japanese); Zhōnghuá Mínguó Wéixīn Zhèngfǔ (Chinese pinyin); Chūka minkoku Ishin Seifu (Japanese rōmaji)
- 1938–1940
- Five Races Under One Union Flag
- Anthem: Song to the Auspicious Cloud (1938–1940) (Note: Modified version used in 1921–1928.)
- Territory of the Reformed Government in central China
- Status: Unrecognized government; Puppet government of the Empire of Japan
- Capital: Nanjing
- Largest city: Shanghai
- Common languages: Chinese
- Government: Dictatorship
- President of the Executive Yuan
  - 1938–1940: Liang Hongzhi
- Historical era: Second Sino-Japanese War
  - Established: 28 March 1938
  - Merged into Reorganized National Government: 30 March 1940
Preceded by	Succeeded by
Republic of China; Great Way Government	Reorganized National Government of the Republic of China

Reformed Government of the Republic of China

Chinese name
- Traditional Chinese: 中華民國維新政府
- Simplified Chinese: 中华民国维新政府
Transcriptions
Standard Mandarin
- Hanyu Pinyin: Zhōnghuá Mínguó Wéixīn Zhèngfǔ

Japanese name
- Kyūjitai: 中華民國維新政府
- Shinjitai: 中華民国維新政府
Transcriptions
- Romanization: Chūka Minkoku Ishin Seifu

The Reformed Government of the Republic of China was a puppet state created by Japan that existed in eastern China from 1938 to 1940 during the Second Sino-Japanese War. The regime had little authority or popular support, nor did it receive international recognition even from Japan itself, lasting only two years before it was merged with the Provisional Government into the Reorganized National Government of the Republic of China under Wang Jingwei. Due to the extensive powers of the Japanese advisors within the government and its own limited powers, the Reformed Government was not much more than an arm of the Japanese military administration.

== History ==
After the retreat of Kuomintang forces from Nanjing in 1938, and from their defeat in the Battle of Nanjing, the Japanese Imperial General Headquarters authorized the creation of a collaborationist regime to give the semblance of at least nominal local control over Japanese-occupied central and south China. Northern China was already under a separate administration, the Provisional Government of the Republic of China, from December 1937. The Japanese Central China Area Army drafted plans that month to set up its own puppet government in the Lower Yangtze region. Several documents were made that laid out the details of providing it with financial support as well as the economic and political goals for forming the regime. The documents also acknowledged the eventual merger of the Provisional Government with the one in Central China. The task they focused on was recruiting political and military leaders to head the government.

The first candidate to lead the government was Tang Shaoyi, a former Kuomintang leader who was in opposition to Chiang Kai-shek. He was willing to do it but the Japanese were not able to grant his demand to unite the Provisional Government under his leadership, and thus they decided to save him for a later date. However, Tang was assassinated not too long after that. They ended up finding and negotiating with Liang Hongzhi, a former Anhui clique politician of the early Republican era who had ties to Japan. He and several other recruited candidates met in Tokyo and it was later decided at a meeting on 19 February 1938 that the regime would use the old flag and anthem of the Chinese Republic (Beiyang Government).

The Reformed Government of the Republic of China was established by Liang Hongzhi and others on 28 March 1938 at the National Great Hall, and was assigned control of the provinces of Jiangsu, Zhejiang and Anhui as well as the two municipalities of Nanjing and Shanghai. The regime's manifesto, called the "Manifesto of the Founding of the Reformed Government", pointed out the consequences of the Kuomintang government and thanked their Japanese allies for "rescuing" China, claiming that the Reformed Government was the solution, stating "its sole mandate being to restore territorial sovereignty to the prewar situation and return the ruptured relationship with our neighboring country to cordiality". The manifesto acknowledged the government's limited territorial reach, but insisted that this would end when it merged with the Provisional Government in the north.

The government's activities were carefully prescribed and overseen by “advisors” provided by the Japanese China Expeditionary Army. The failure of the Japanese to give any real authority to the Reformed Government discredited it in the eyes of the local inhabitants, and made its existence of only limited propaganda utility to the Japanese authorities. The Reformed Government was, along with the Provisional Government of the Republic of China, merged into Wang Jingwei's Nanjing-based Reorganized National Government on 30 March 1940.

== Armed forces ==
The Reformed Government army was led by Pacification Minister (Chinese: 绥靖部部长; pinyin: Suíjìng bù bùzhǎng) Ren Yuandao and initially consisted of about 10,000 men at its creation, and later rose to 30,000 by 1939. The army's troops were considered to be unreliable by the Japanese due to their poor training and lack of equipment. A military academy was set up with an initial class of a few hundred cadets, in order to provide a reliable officer corps that was "untainted" by previous service in the National Revolutionary Army. However, the Reformed Government Army remained largely incompetent and was reported to have fled from the insurgents they encountered. A small navy was also established to patrol the rivers and coastline with some small vessels, led by a defected admiral of the Nationalist navy. In addition, an air force was planned to be established and some training gliders were purchased from Japan, but it was not formed by the time the government was merged.

== See also ==
- Nanjing Massacre
- Wang Jingwei regime

Preceded by Nationalist government (1927–1948)	Reformed Government of the Republic of China; 1938–1940	Succeeded by Reorganized National Government of the Republic of China (1940–1945)
