= Liang Hongzhi =

Chinese politician (1882–1946)

- 梁鴻志
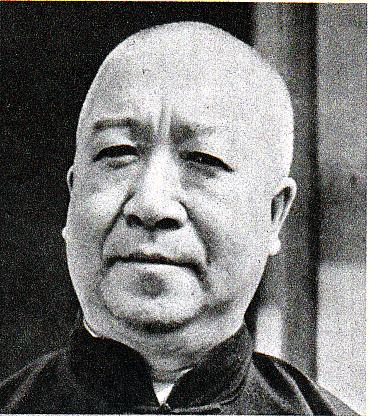

President of the Executive Yuan of the Reformed Government of the Republic of China
- In office 28 March 1938 – 30 March 1940
- Preceded by: Position established
- Succeeded by: Position abolished

Personal details
- Born: 1882 Changle, Fuzhou, Fujian, China
- Died: November 6, 1946 (aged 64) Shanghai, China
- Education: Peking University

Liang Hongzhi; (Chinese: 梁鴻志; pinyin: Liáng Hóngzhì; Wade-Giles: Liang Hung-chih; Hepburn: Ryō Koushi, 1882 - November 6, 1946) was a leading official in the Anhui clique of the Beiyang Government, later noted for his role as in the collaborationist Reformed Government of the Republic of China during World War II.

== Biography ==
Liang was a native of Changle in Fujian province. From 1888 to 1890, he lived in Japan, where his father had been dispatched to be a Chinese diplomat. In 1903, he passed the Imperial examination and in 1905 was accepted to the predecessor to Beijing University. In 1908, he was sent as an official to Shandong province. After the Xinhai Revolution and the formation of the Republic of China, he was recruited to the nationalist government by Yuan Shikai. After the death of Yuan, he gave his allegiance to Duan Qirui, warlord of the Anhui clique, serving as secretary to Duan Zhigui. After the defeat of the Anhui clique in the Zhili–Anhui War, he fled to the Japanese concession in Tianjin.

He returned to Beijing in November 1924 after the Beijing coup and put in charge of a provisional government after an agreement with Zhang Zuolin and Feng Yuxiang, but fled again in 1928 after the successes of Chiang Kai-shek's Northern Expedition. When a warrant for Liang's arrest was issued by the Kuomintang, he fled to Dalian in the Kwantung Leased Territory under Japanese jurisdiction together with Duan Qirui.

After the Manchurian Incident of 1931, Liang returned with Duan to Tianjin, and then to Shanghai and was with Duan when he died in 1937.

After the Second Sino-Japanese War broke out in 1937, the Imperial Japanese Army quickly overran northern and portions of eastern China, and the Japanese Imperial General Headquarters authorized the creation of a collaborationist regimes as part of its overall strategy to establish an autonomous buffer zones between North China and Japanese-controlled Manchukuo. The Provisional Government of the Republic of China based in Beijing was formed on December 14, 1937, with Wang Kemin as its prime minister of the five provinces of northern China. The Reformed Government of the Republic of China based in Nanjing was subsequently created on 28 March 1938 in eastern China and Liang was recruited to take the post of premier.

The Reformed Government of the Republic of China was assigned nominal control of the provinces of Jiangsu, Zhejiang and Anhui as well as the two municipalities of Nanjing and Shanghai. However, its activities were carefully prescribed and overseen by “advisors” provided by the Japanese China Expeditionary Army. The failure of the Japanese to give any real authority to the Reformed Government discredited it in the eyes of the local inhabitants, and made its existence of only limited propaganda utility to the Japanese authorities.

The Reformed Government was, along with the Provisional Government of the Republic of China, merged into Wang Jingwei's Nanjing Nationalist Government on March 30, 1940. In the new regime, Liang held only ceremonial posts, including the nominal governorship of Jiangsu Province and chairman of the Legislative Yuan, retiring before the end of World War II. Liang was arrested by the government of the Republic of China after the surrender of Japan and tried for treason in Suzhou. He was sentenced to death and executed by firing squad in Shanghai on November 6, 1946.

== See also ==
- Huaxing Commercial Bank
