= Nanjing =

Capital of Jiangsu, China

Nanjing 南京市 Nanking
- Prefecture-level and sub-provincial city
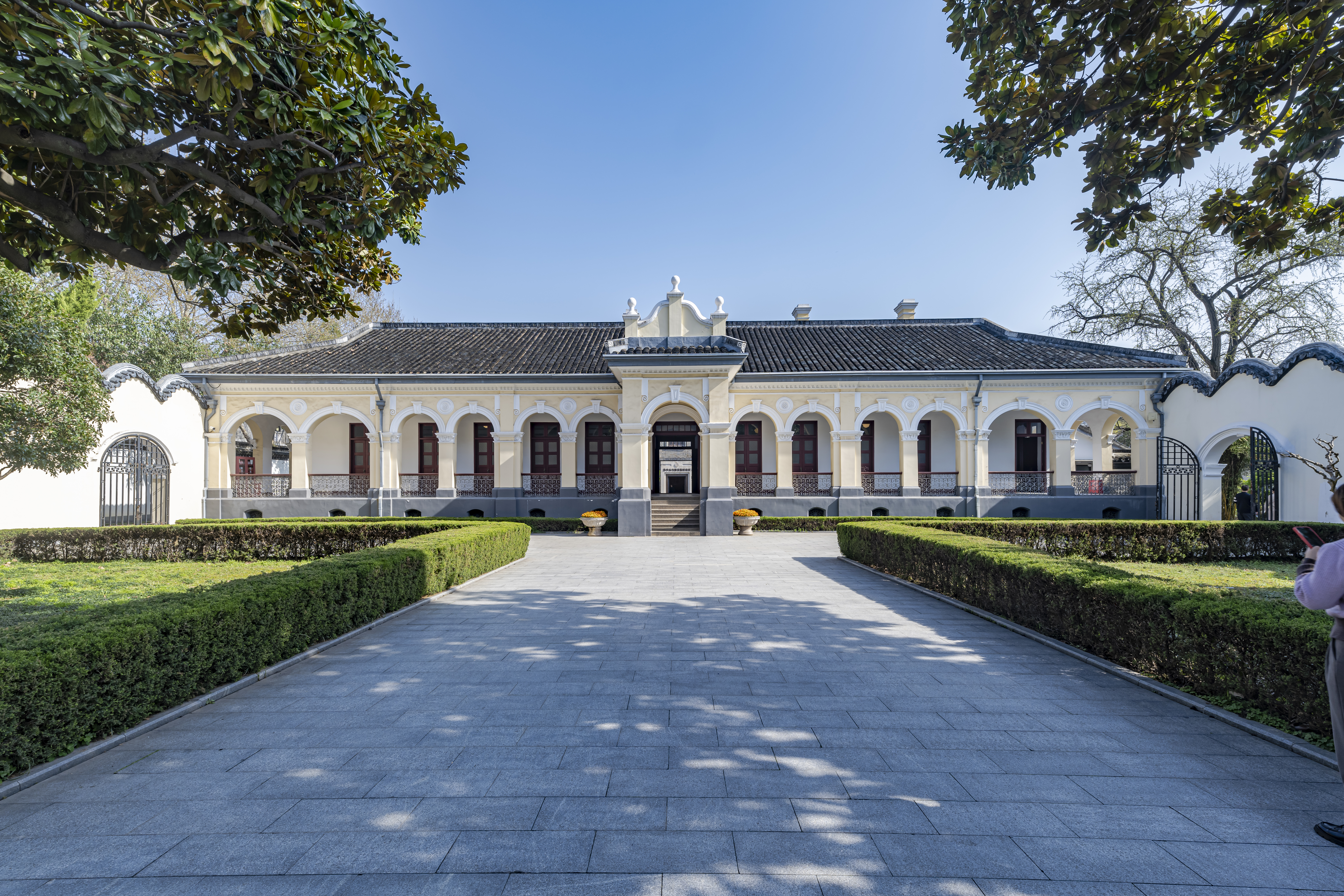
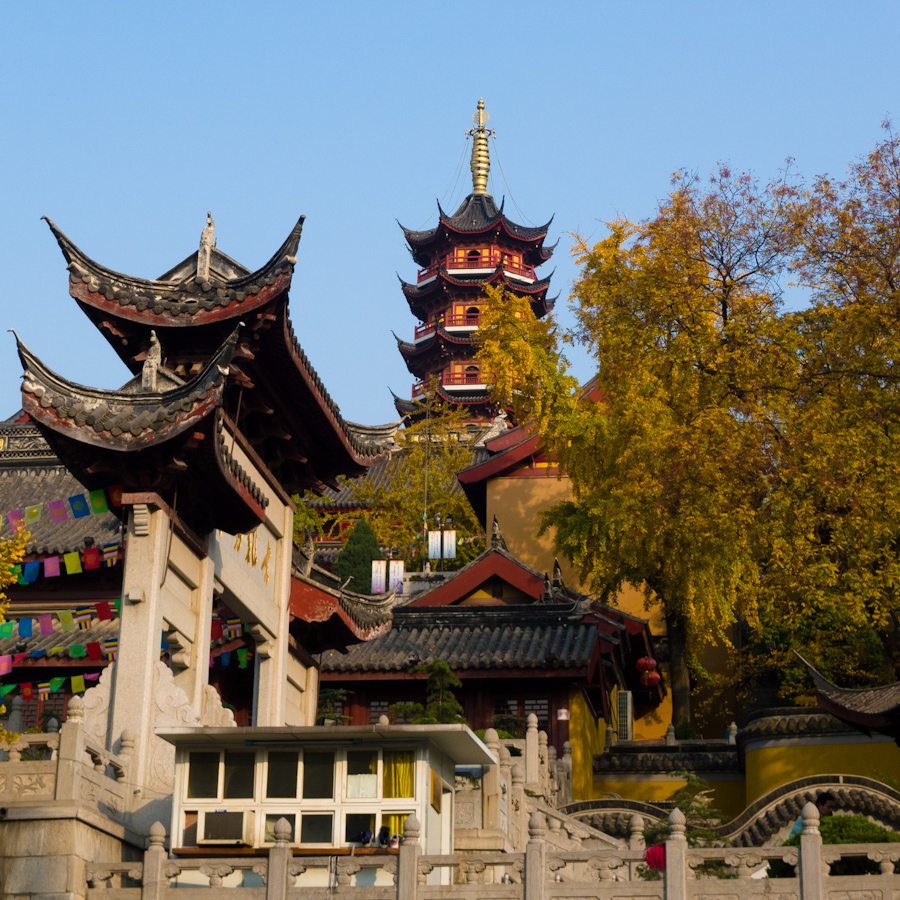
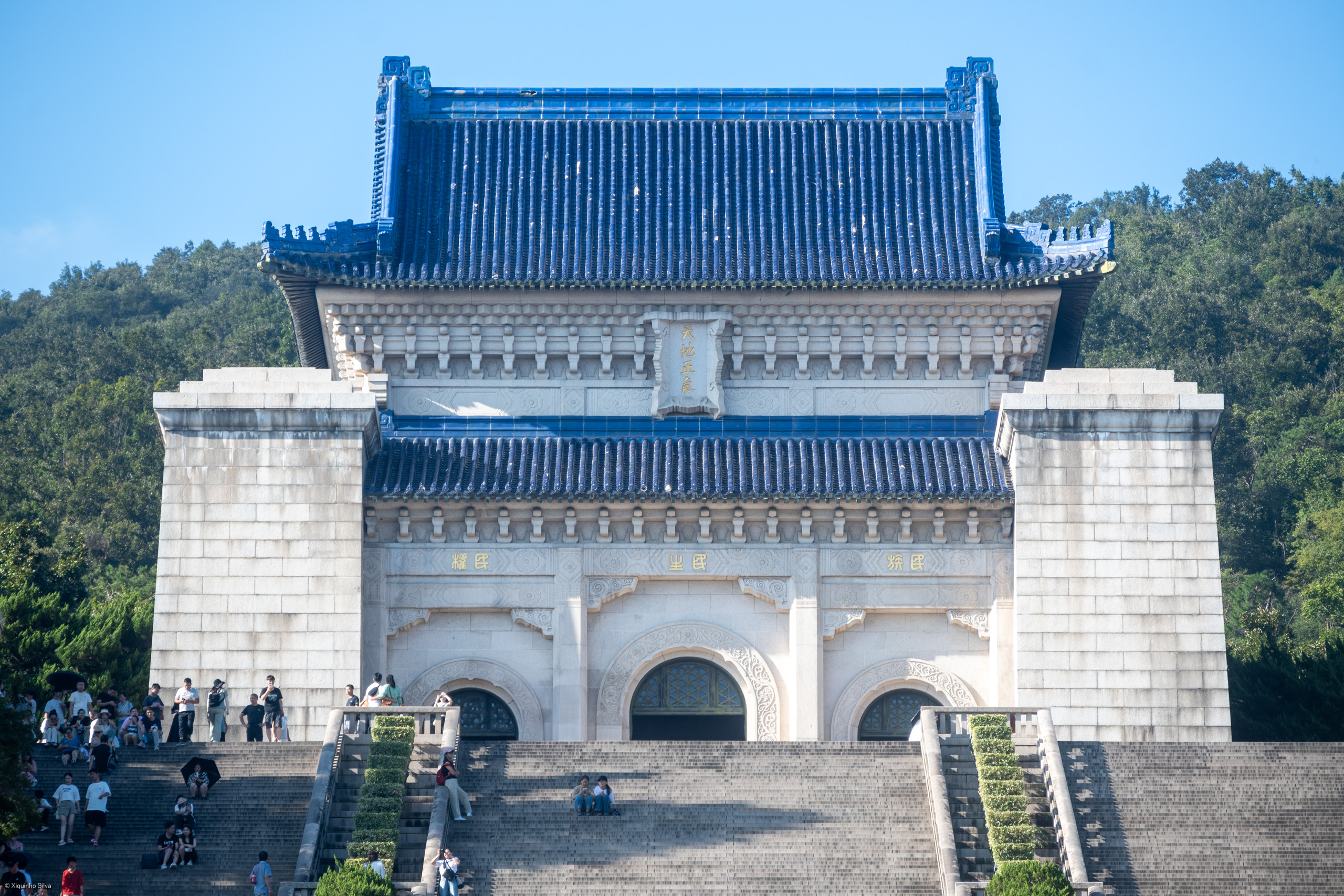
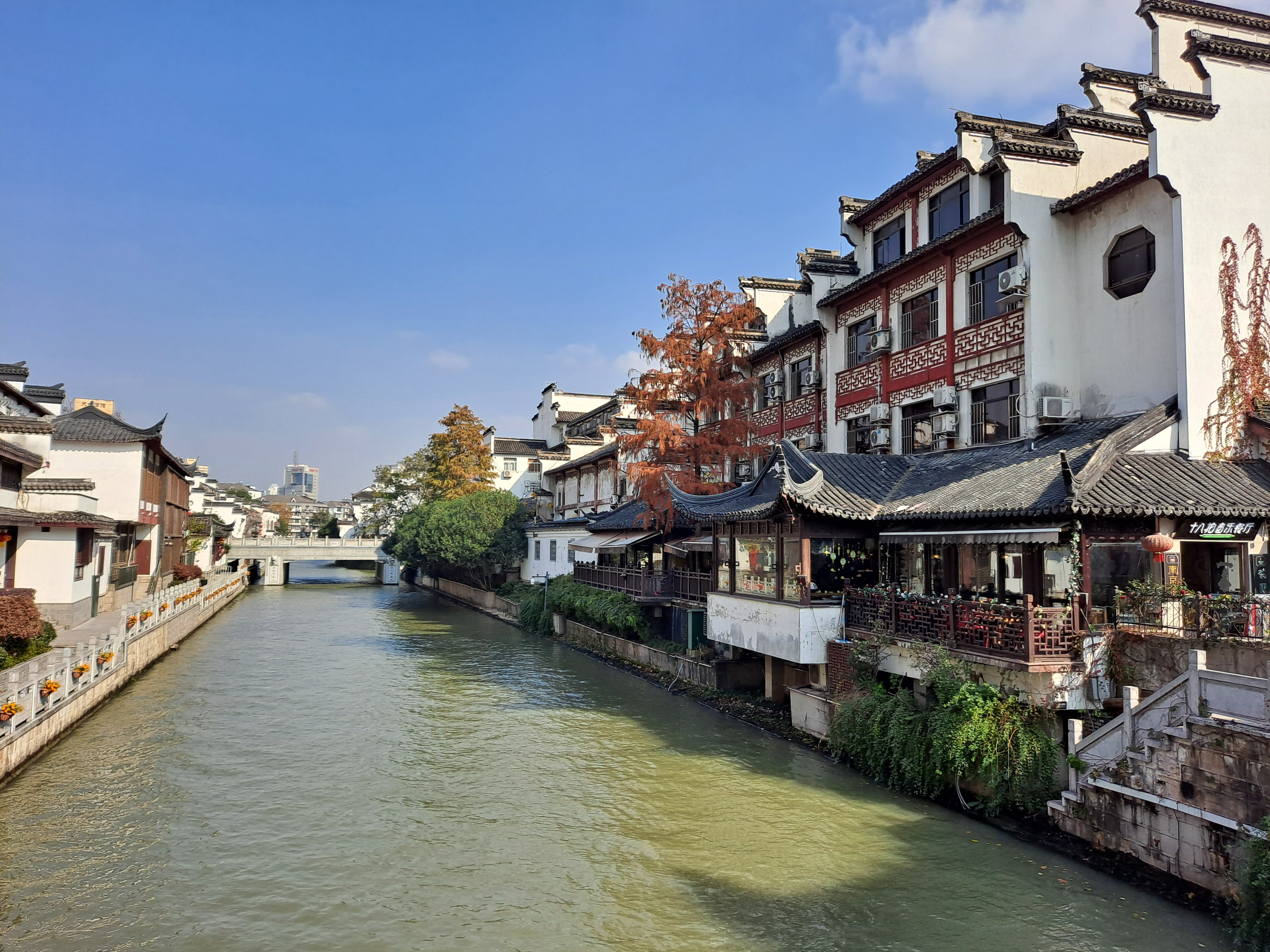
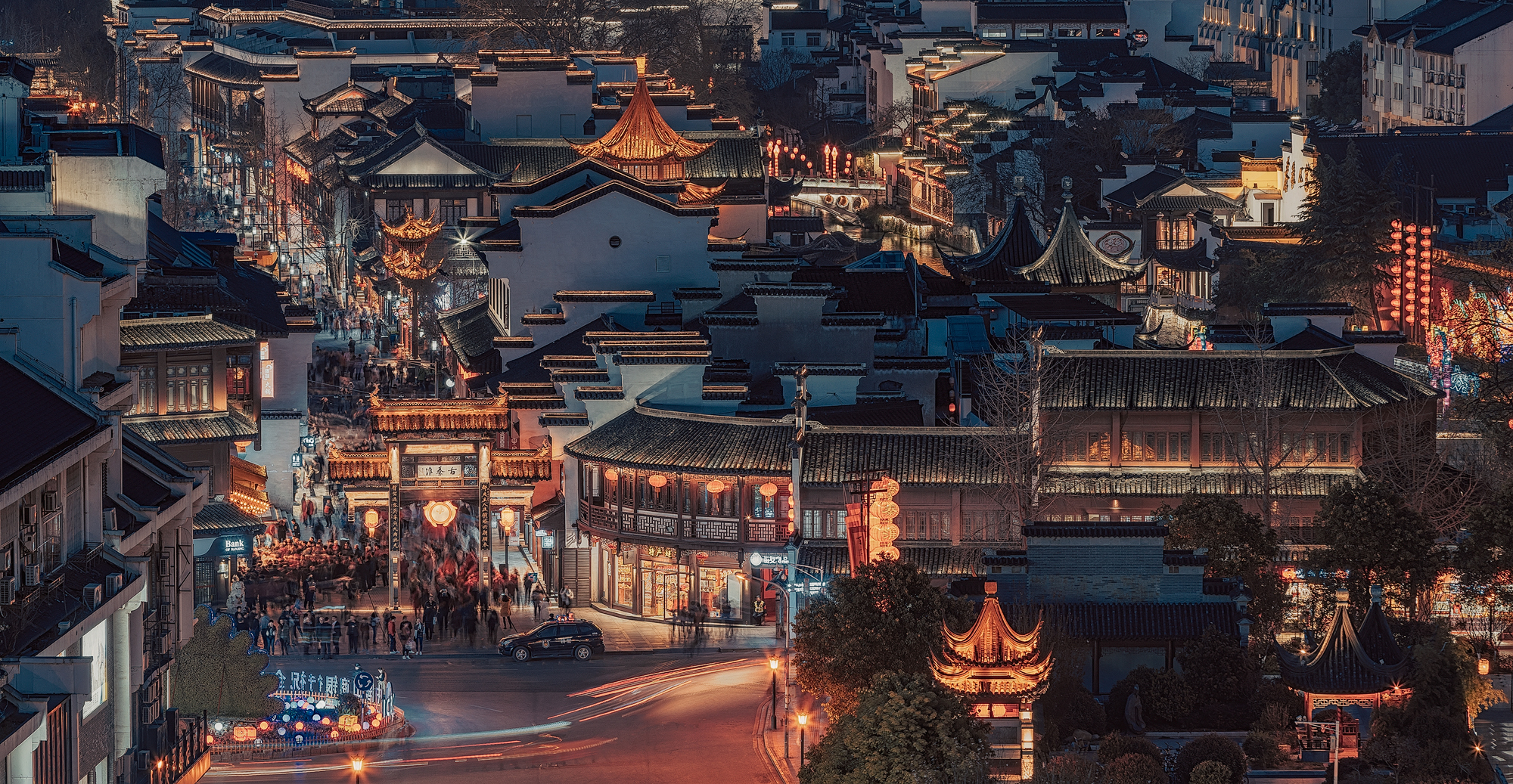
- Presidential Palace Jiming Temple Sun Yat-sen Mausoleum Qinhuai River Nanjing Fuzimiao

- Location of Nanjing City jurisdiction in Jiangsu

- Location in China Nanjing (China)
- Coordinates: 32°03′39″N 118°46′44″E
- Country: China
- Region: East China
- Province: Jiangsu
- County-level: 11
- Township-level: 129
- Settled: Unknown (Yecheng, 495 BCE, Jinling City, 333 BCE)
- Municipal seat: Xuanwu District

Government
  - Type: Sub-provincial city
  - Body: Nanjing Municipal People's Congress
  - Party Secretary: Zhou Hongbo
  - Congress Chairman: Lü Deming
  - Mayor: Li Zhongjun
  - CPPCC Chairman: Wang Liping

Area
  - City: 6,587 km^{2} (2,543 sq mi)
  - Urban: 1,398.69 km^{2} (540.04 sq mi)
- Elevation: 15 m (50 ft)

Population (2020 census)
  - City: 9,341,685
  - Density: 1,418/km^{2} (3,673/sq mi)
  - Urban: 9,341,685
  - Metro: 9,684,136
- Demonym: Nanjingese or Nanjinger (Note: Nankinese, sometimes may be translated as Nanjinese, Nankinese, Nankingese, Nanjinger, Nankiner, etc.. In Nanjingese, final -n and -ng are not distinguished.)

GDP(2025)
  - City: CN¥ 1.940 trillion US$ 278.9 billion
  - Per capita: CN¥ 207,979; US$ 29,856
- Time zone: UTC+08:00 (China Standard)
- Postal code: 210000–211300
- Area code: 25
- ISO 3166 code: CN-JS-01
- Languages: Nanjingese; Standard Mandarin; Northern and Xuanzhou Wu (Liyang, Gaochun)
- Website: Nanjing
- City trees Deodar Cedar (Cedrus deodara), Platanus × hispanica City flowers Méi (Prunus mume)

Nanjing (Note: English: /nænˈdʒɪŋ/ nan-JING; Chinese: 南京; pinyin: Nánjīng; Standard Mandarin pronunciation: [nǎn.tɕíŋ]; Nanjingese: Lan^{2} jin^{1} (Lánjìn); Nanjingese pronunciation: [lã˨˦ t͡ɕĩ˧˩]; Alternatively romanized as Nanking (/nænˈkɪŋ/ nan-KING)) is the capital of Jiangsu province in China. The city, which is located in the southwestern corner of the province, has 11 districts, an administrative area of 6,600 square kilometres (2,500 sq mi), and as of 2021 a population of 9,423,400. Situated in the Yangtze River Delta, Nanjing has a prominent place in Chinese history and culture, having served as the capital of various Chinese dynasties, kingdoms and republican governments dating from the 3rd century to 1949, and has thus long been a major center of culture, education, research, politics, economy, transport networks and tourism, being home to one of the world's largest inland ports. The city is also one of the fifteen sub-provincial cities in the People's Republic of China's administrative structure, enjoying jurisdictional and economic autonomy only slightly less than that of a province. It has also been awarded the title of 2008 Habitat Scroll of Honor of China, Special UN Habitat Scroll of Honor Award, and National Civilized City. Nanjing is also considered a Beta (global second-tier) city classification, together with Chongqing, Hangzhou, and Tianjin by the Globalization and World Cities Research Network, and ranked as one of the world's top 100 cities in the Global Financial Centres Index.

As of 2021, Nanjing has 68 institutions of higher learning, including 13 double-first-class universities, ten 111-plan universities, eight 211 universities, and 97 academies. Nanjing University, which has a long history, is among the world's top 10 universities ranked by the Nature Index. The ratio of college students to the total population ranks No.1 among large cities nationwide. Nanjing has the fifth-largest scientific research output of any city in the world. As of 2024, it has been ranked as the world's second most prolific scientific research center in earth and environmental sciences and the world's third most prolific scientific research center in chemistry and physical sciences, according to the Nature Index.

Nanjing, one of the nation's most important cities for over a thousand years, is recognized as one of the Four Great Ancient Capitals of China. It has been one of the world's largest cities, enjoying peace and prosperity despite various wars and disasters. Nanjing served as the capital of Eastern Wu (229–280), one of the three major states in the Three Kingdoms period; the Eastern Jin and each of the Southern dynasties (Liu Song, Southern Qi, Liang and Chen), which successively ruled southern China from 317 to 589; the Southern Tang (937–975), one of the Ten Kingdoms; the Ming dynasty (1368–1421); and the Republic of China (1927–1937, 1946–1949), serving as the internationally recognized capital of China and the seat of the central government of China under the Kuomintang, until the government's relocation to Taipei at the conclusion of the Chinese Civil War. The city also served as the seat of the rebel Taiping Heavenly Kingdom (1853–1864) and the Japanese-installed collaborationist regime of Wang Jingwei (1940–1945) during the Second Sino-Japanese War. It suffered devastating atrocities in both conflicts, most notably the Nanjing Massacre of 1937–1938.

Nanjing became the capital city of Jiangsu province in 1952, after serving as a Direct-administered Municipality from 1949 to 1952 following the establishment of the People's Republic of China. It has many important heritage sites, including the Presidential Palace, Sun Yat-sen Mausoleum, and Ming Xiaoling Mausoleum. Nanjing is famous for human historical landscapes, mountains and waters such as Fuzimiao, Ming Palace, Chaotian Palace, Porcelain Tower, Drum Tower, Stone City, City Wall, Qinhuai River, Xuanwu Lake, and Purple Mountain. Key cultural facilities include Nanjing Library, Nanjing Museum, and Jiangsu Art Museum.

== Names ==
Nanjing
- "Nanjing" in Chinese characters
- Chinese: 南京
- Postal: Nanking
- Literal meaning: "Southern Capital"
Transcriptions
Standard Mandarin
- Hanyu Pinyin: Nánjīng
- Bopomofo: ㄋㄢˊ ㄐㄧㄥ
- Wade–Giles: Nan^{2}-ching^{1}
- Tongyong Pinyin: Nánjing
- IPA: [nǎn.tɕíŋ]
Wu
- Wugniu: noe^{2} cin^{1}
- IPA: Shanghainese: [nø˩ tɕin˦]
Yue: Cantonese
- Yale Romanization: Nàahmgīng or Nàahmgìng
- Jyutping: naam4 ging1
- IPA: [nam˩ kɪŋ˥] or [nam˩ kɪŋ˥˧]
Southern Min
- Hokkien POJ: Lâm-kiaⁿ (col.); Lâm-king (lit.)
- Tâi-lô: Lâm-kiann (col.); Lâm-king (lit.)

=== Nanjing ===
The name "Nanjing" (literally "Southern Capital") was formally established to designate the modern-day city in 1368, the first year of the Ming dynasty. Upon establishing his capital there, the Hongwu Emperor officially named it "Southern Capital" to distinguish it from the "Northern Capital" at Kaifeng. The name later served as a counterpart to the Northern Capital, Beijing.

Nanjing, formerly romanized as Nanqim, Nankin, and Nanking, was also transcribed in the Wade–Giles system as Nan-ching.

=== Jinling ===
There was a yi (settlement) known as Jinling (Chinese: 金陵; pinyin: Jīnlíng; lit. 'Ridge with the Gold') around the 4th century BCE in the area—mentioning the specific metal that later lore insisted must have been buried by the Chu monarch, before it was renamed Moling (Chinese: 秣陵; pinyin: Mòlíng; lit. 'Haltered Ridge') after Qin's unification. Between 624 and 626, the name "Jinling" was briefly restored as a county designation. By the early 10th century, the Yang Wu regime once again designated this area as Jinling. In the early Republican era, Jinling Circuit was established to administer Nanjing and its surrounding counties.

=== Jiangning and Shangyuan ===
At the turn of the 4th century, Jiangning (Chinese: 江寧; pinyin: Jiāngníng; lit. 'Tranquil Jiang[nan]') county was established to the southwest of the former Eastern Wu capital, with its seat located in what is now Jiangning Subdistrict. Following the Sui dynasty's destruction of Jiankang, several counties within the former metropolitan area were annexed into Jiangning, and this remained the primary designation for the county until the mid-Tang period.

In 761, Emperor Suzong of Tang renamed the area Shangyuan (Chinese: 上元; pinyin: Shàngyuán; lit. 'Upper Prime'), after his regnal era. In 917, Jiangning county was partitioned from the southern territories; since then, both county seats came to be located within the same walled city. Subsequently, during the periods of 937–975, 1018–1129, and 1645–1911, the Nanjing region was designated as Jiangning Prefecture, with Shangyuan long serving as the prefectural seat.

== History ==
=== Pre-imperial and early imperial eras ===
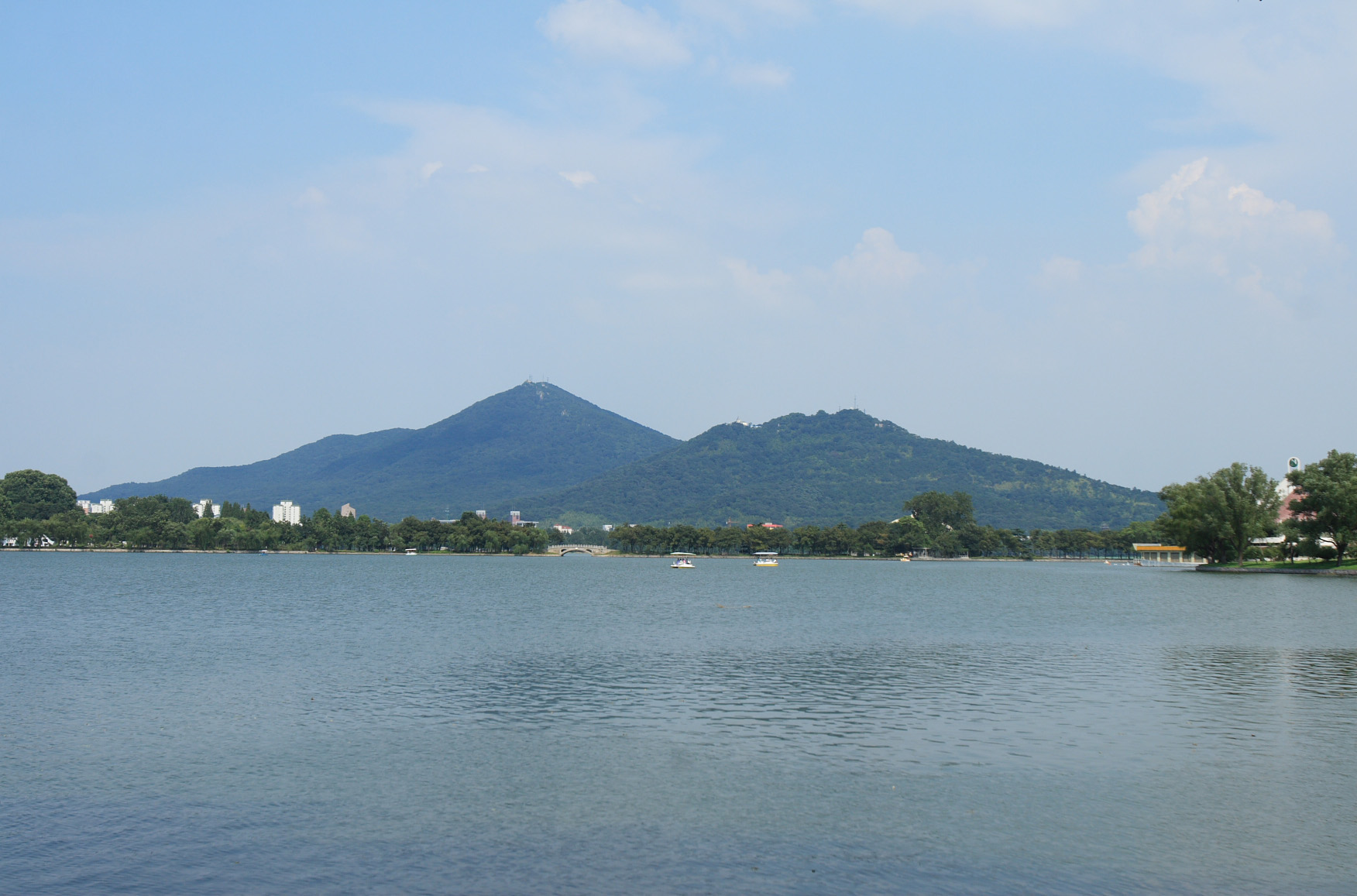
Purple Mountain or Zijin Shan, located to the east of the walled city of Nanjing

Human habitation in the Nanjing region dates to the Neolithic period. Sites near the modern urban core, including the type-site of the Beiyinyangying (北阴阳营) culture, contain a cemetery with 225 burials and grave goods like polished stone tools, jade, and agate, indicating connections with the Lake Tai region. Incised pictorial marks on zun pottery vessels have also been recovered from Beiyinyangying and related late Dawenkou-period deposits.

The lower strata of the Dianjiangtai (点将台) site in Pukou are contemporaneous with the Erlitou period and predate the Bronze Age Hushu (湖熟) culture, which characterized the Ning–Zhen (Nanjing–Zhenjiang) area during the second millennium BCE.

At the Xijie (西街) site on the south bank of the Qinhuai River, archaeological excavations have identified a fortified settlement with concentric ditches and wall foundations dating to the Shang–Zhou transition. While its precise relationship to later historical cities is undetermined, the site indicates organized settlement in the Qinhuai area prior to the urban foundations documented in transmitted texts.

Historical records attribute early named urban foundations in the area to the 5th century BCE: Yuecheng, reportedly built by Fan Li of Yue, and Yecheng, associated in later accounts with metallurgical activity and attributed to King Fuchai of Wu. However, their exact locations and chronologies remain subjects of academic debate. Under Chu rule, the area was known as Jinling, before being renamed Moling following the Qin unification.

=== Six Dynasties period ===
Throughout the Six Dynasties period, successive regimes in the southeast maintained their administrative center at Jiankang (originally Jianye), except for brief intervals in 221–229, 265–267, and 552–554, when the seat of government relocated to the middle Yangtze.

In 211, Sun Quan moved his headquarters to Moling. The following year, he fortified Shitou Hill to build the Stone City and renamed the region Jianye (建業). After proclaiming himself emperor in 229, Sun Quan established his capital here and built the Taichu (太初) Palace, followed by the larger Zhaoming (昭明) Palace in 267. These structures were largely destroyed during the Western Jin conquest and subsequent early 4th-century conflicts.

In 305, the local warlord Chen Min seized Jianye and repaired the Taichu ruins, but was ousted two years later by Sima Rui, the Prince of Langye. To avoid a naming taboo for Emperor Min of Jin, the city was renamed Jiankang in 313. Following the fall of Northern China, Sima Rui established Jiankang as his capital in 317, founding the Eastern Jin dynasty in the next year.

The Su Jun Rebellion (327–329) destroyed the imperial palaces, prompting a comprehensive reconstruction between 330 and 332 that defined Jiankang's layout for the Southern Dynasties. The city initially lacked brick walls, using natural topography and bamboo stockades instead; formal brick walls appeared around 480.

While residential areas historically concentrated south of the Qinhuai River, the expansion of the city gates facilitated development in other directions. The addition of eastern gates encouraged the growth of eastern suburbs housing aristocratic estates. Meanwhile, the central parklands were repurposed as the primary imperial residence, known as Taicheng (臺城, "Terrace City").

In the late 4th century, the prince Sima Daozi's grand residence, Dongfu (東府, "Eastern Mansion"), and the administrative seat Xizhoucheng (西州城, "Western Province City") emerged as secondary political centers. The Dongfu was formally fortified in 414. During subsequent dynasties, Dongfu typically housed chancellors and governors, while Xizhou served as residences for imperial princes.

From the 450s, Emperor Xiaowu undertook ritual reforms to legitimize Jiankang as a permanent capital, including relocating nanjiao (南郊, "the Southern Suburbs [imperial altar]") to align with the city's central axis according to cosmological principles. Canals connected Jiankang to regional centers, making it a trade hub. Only imperial palaces were fully walled; aristocratic mansions, temples, markets, and dwellings spread across surrounding areas, with commerce centered on four large walled markets plus smaller specialized markets.

Jiankang became a major cultural center. The region's vernacular lyrics were codified into the Yuefu (Music Bureau) corpus as "Songs of Wu." By the late 5th century, sites like Wuyi Lane (烏衣巷, "Black Robe Lane") and Xiao Ziliang's Western Residence (西邸, Xidi) hosted prominent literary circles, including the "Eight Friends of Jingling." (竟陵八友).

The city emerged as a major center of East Asian Buddhism; by the Liang dynasty, the city housed over 500 monasteries. These included the Tongtai Temple (同泰寺), built in 527 near the palace (site of the modern Jiming Temple). Emperor Wu opened the Datong (大通) Gate in the palace wall for direct access to the temple, which hosted major state-sponsored Buddhist assemblies where the emperor participated as a lay devotee.

In the first half of the 6th century, Jiankang's population likely exceeded 300,000. However, the Hou Jing Disturbance in 548 ended this period. Hou Jing, a former frontier commander, besieged Taicheng for five months. In 552, loyalist forces defeated Hou Jing and subsequently looted the city. Chen Baxian, one of the victorious generals, eventually launched a coup and ascended the throne there.

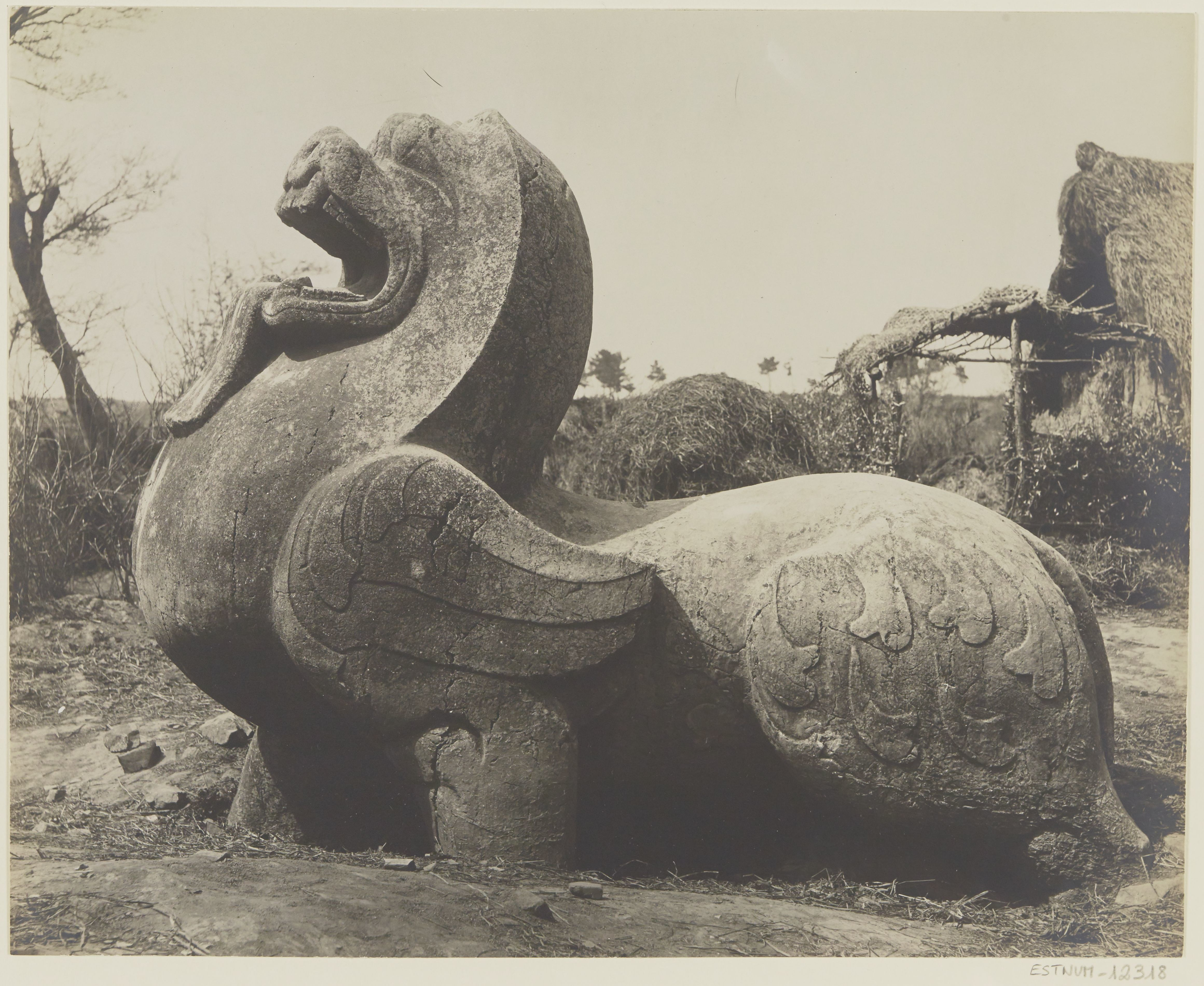
A bixie sculpture at Xiao Xiu's tomb (AD 518).

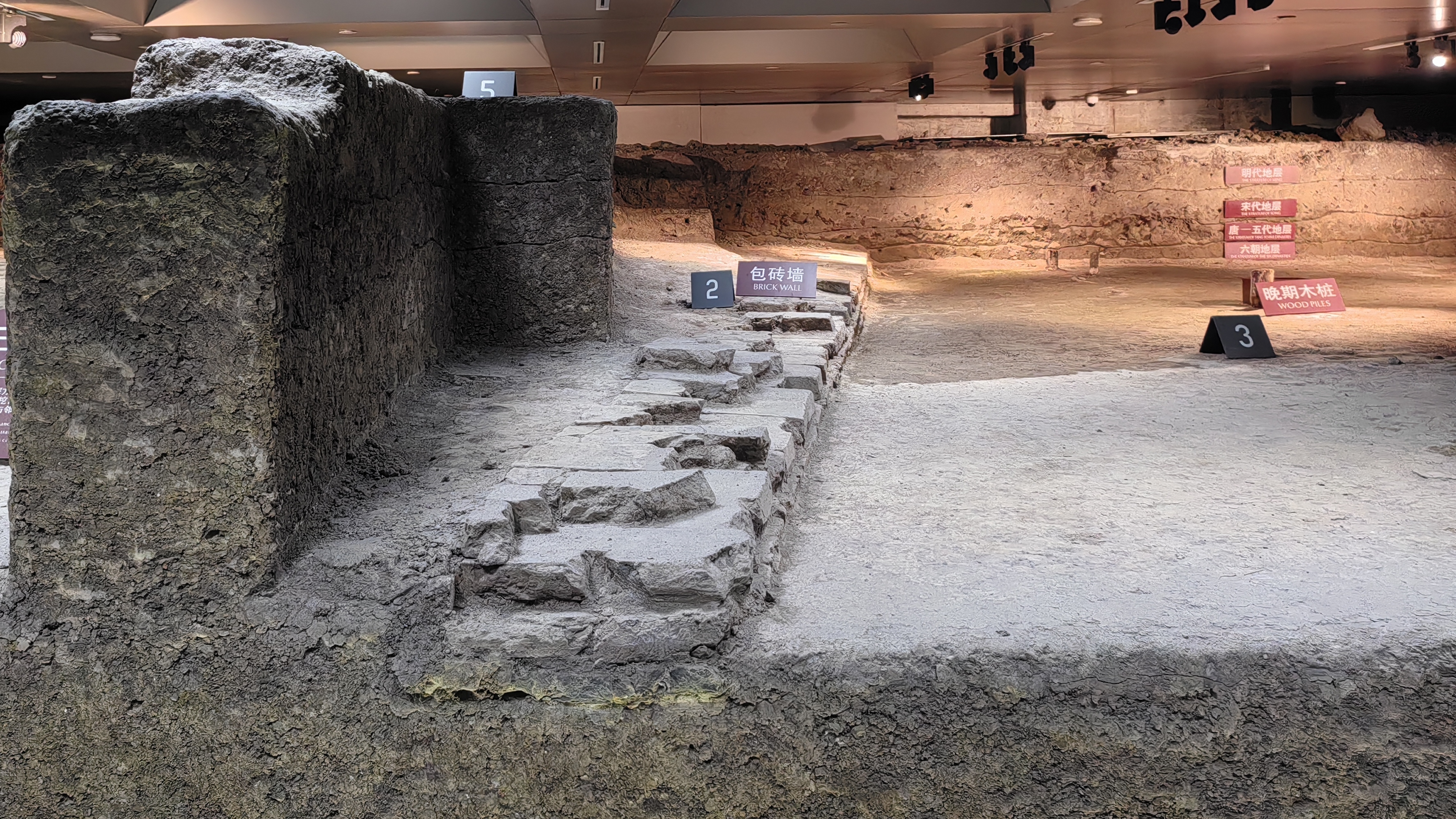
Site of Jiankang in the Oriental Metropolitan Museum

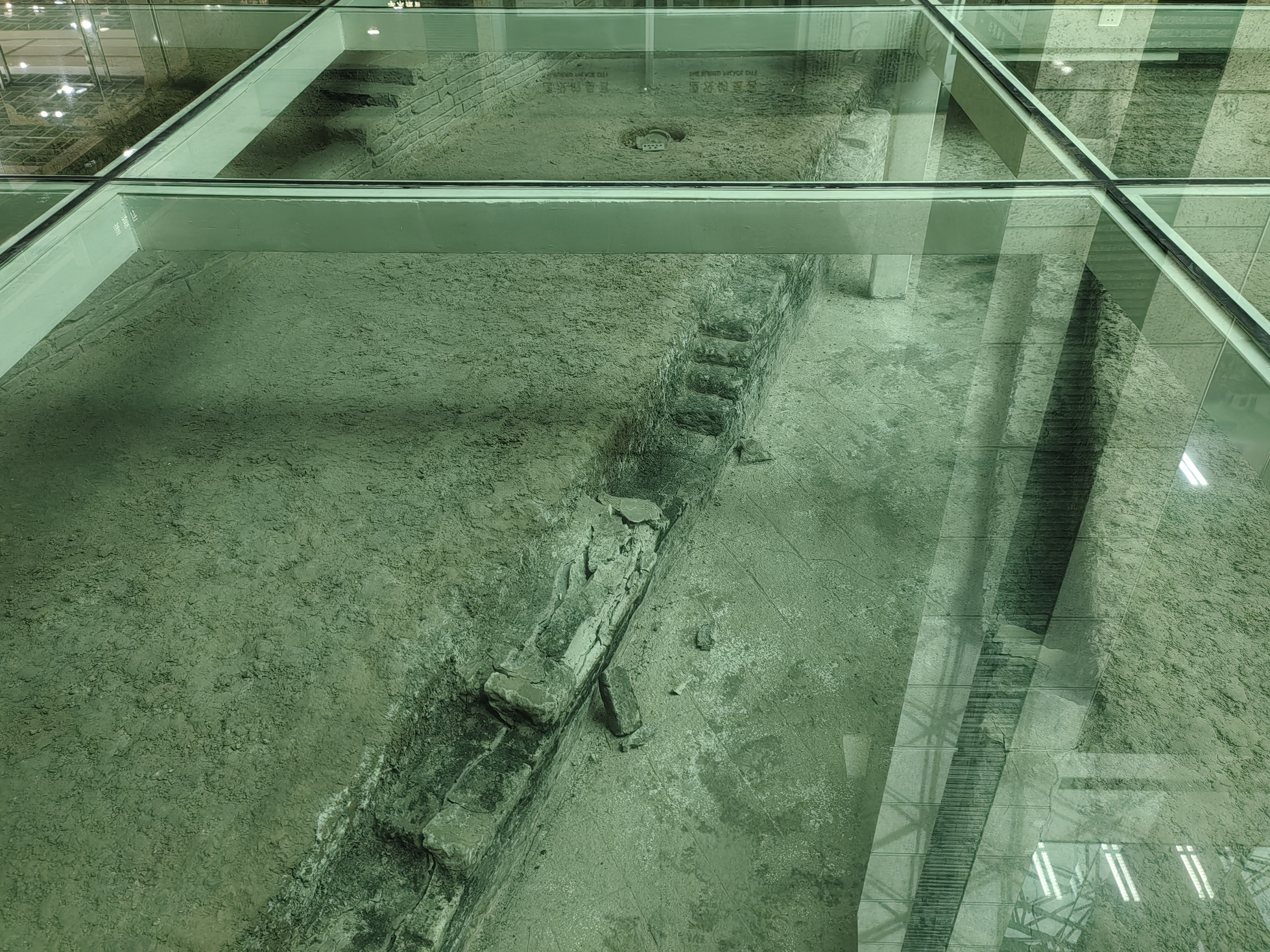
Excavation site of Taicheng in the Nanjing Library

=== Middle Imperial period (589–1368) ===
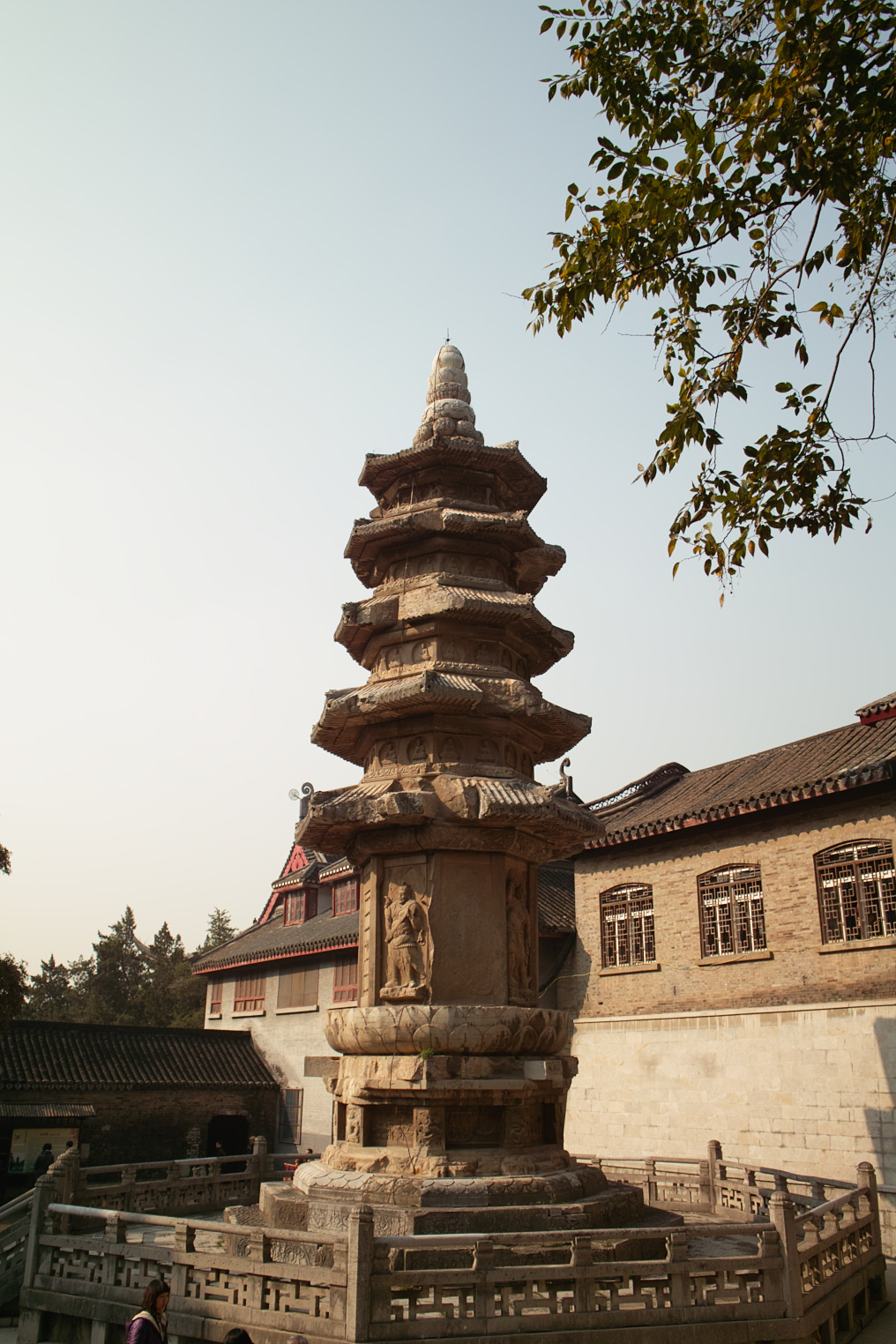
The Śarīra pagoda in Qixia Temple. It was built in AD 601 and rebuilt in the 10th century.

Emperor Wen of Sui ordered the demolition of Jiankang after controlled the city in 589; its walls, palaces, and residences were leveled, and the land was reclaimed for agriculture. The Chen ruler, royal family, and high officials were deported to the Sui capital. In 624, the Tang army suppressed a short-lived regime established in Jiankang by the rebel leader Fu Gongshi. For the next three centuries, the settlement was demoted and for much of the period until 887, subordinated to Runzhou, serving briefly as the seat of the Zhexi (Western Zhejiang) Military Governor from 759 to 761.

Due to the city's fluctuating status around the Six Dynasties, Jiankang's ruins became a frequent topos in classical poetry. Initially laudatory or descriptive, these works evolved by the late Tang into a distinct nostalgic tradition termed "Meditation on the Past at Jinling" (金陵懷古).

By the early tenth century, the city—then known as Shengzhou—regained geopolitical importance. The warlord Xu Wen utilized it as a power base to oppose the Yang Wu regime in Guangling. His adopted son Xu Zhigao (the future Li Bian) expanded the city as prefect. In 932, Xu Zhigao established the Institute for the Veneration of Worthies (Chongxian Yuan) as a scholarly and archival center, and in 936, set up the Office of the Grand Marshal. He ultimately compelled the Yang Wu monarch to abdicate, ascending the throne as emperor of the Southern Tang on November 11 937.

Re-established as the Southern Tang capital of Jiangning (Jinling), the city became a premier center of elite culture and court patronage, particularly renowned for the development of Southern-style landscape (shanshui). Facing pressure from the Later Zhou, the Southern Tang submitted as a vassal; in 959, Li Jing resolved to transfer the capital to Hongzhou (Nanchang), leaving the crown prince Li Yu in charge of Jinling. In early 975, Northern Song forces besieged Jinling, joined by Wuyue troops later that year. On January 4 976, the city fell. Although the Song commander Cao Bin attempted to restrain his troops, Jinling was plundered following Li Yu's surrender.

In 1127, Zhang Bangchang, the ruler of the short-lived puppet state of Da Chu established by the Jin dynasty, briefly designated Jiangning as his capital. Following the establishment of the Southern Song, the city served as a provisional capital for the fleeing court from May 1129 and was renamed Jiankang. During his stay, Emperor Gaozong established a "temporary palace" within the city. Three months later, he relocated the court south to Lin'an. In late 1129, Jurchen forces under the Jin general Wanyan Wushu crossed the Yangtze River and captured Jiankang briefly.

Throughout the 1130s, although many court officials advocated for making Jiankang the permanent capital, Gaozong preferred Lin'an, officially designating it as the temporary capital in 1138. Despite this, Jiankang retained its prestige as a secondary capital and frontline headquarters until it fell to the Mongol forces in 1275.

Under the Yuan dynasty, estates in Jiankang were allotted to Tuqtuqa and his Qipchaq troops, whose clan held hereditary command of the Qipchak Imperial Guard. During his residence in Jiankang, Prince Tugh Temür engaged with local literati and Buddhist clergy. Following his accession in 1329, Jiankang was renamed Jiqing (集慶, "Assembled Felicitations"), to mark the site of his former manor, which he ordered converted into the Longxiang Jiqing Temple (龍翔集慶寺).

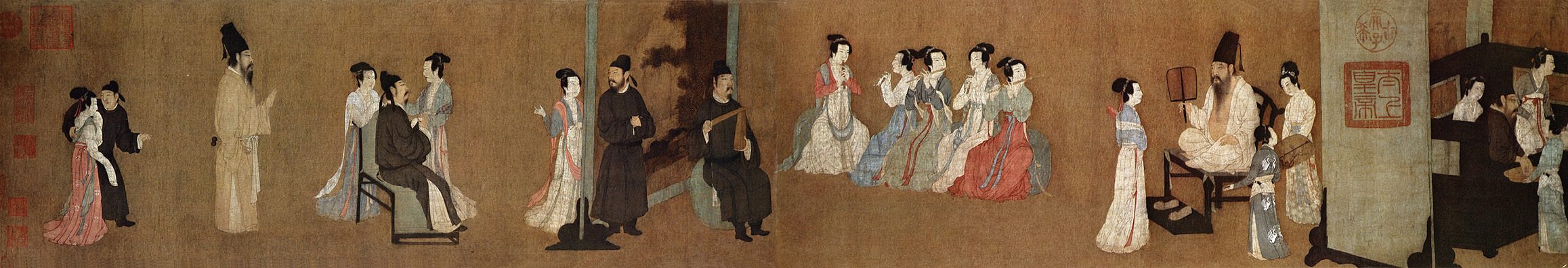
Second half section of "The Night Banquet of Han Xizai" (韓熙載夜宴圖) traditionally attributed to the Southern Tang painter Gu Hongzhong

=== Late Imperial period (1368–1911) ===
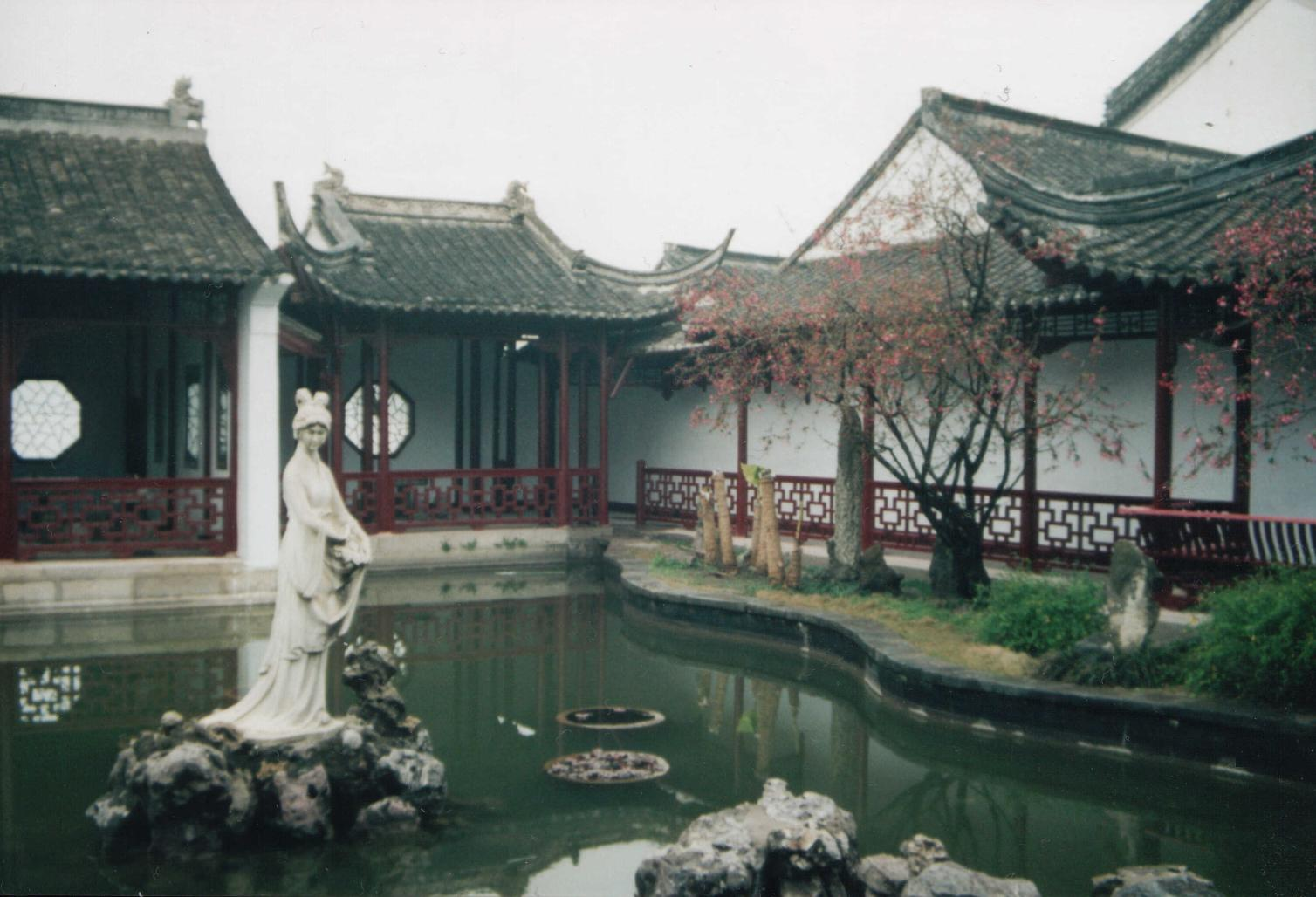
Mochou Lake, established as a garden by the Hongwu Emperor

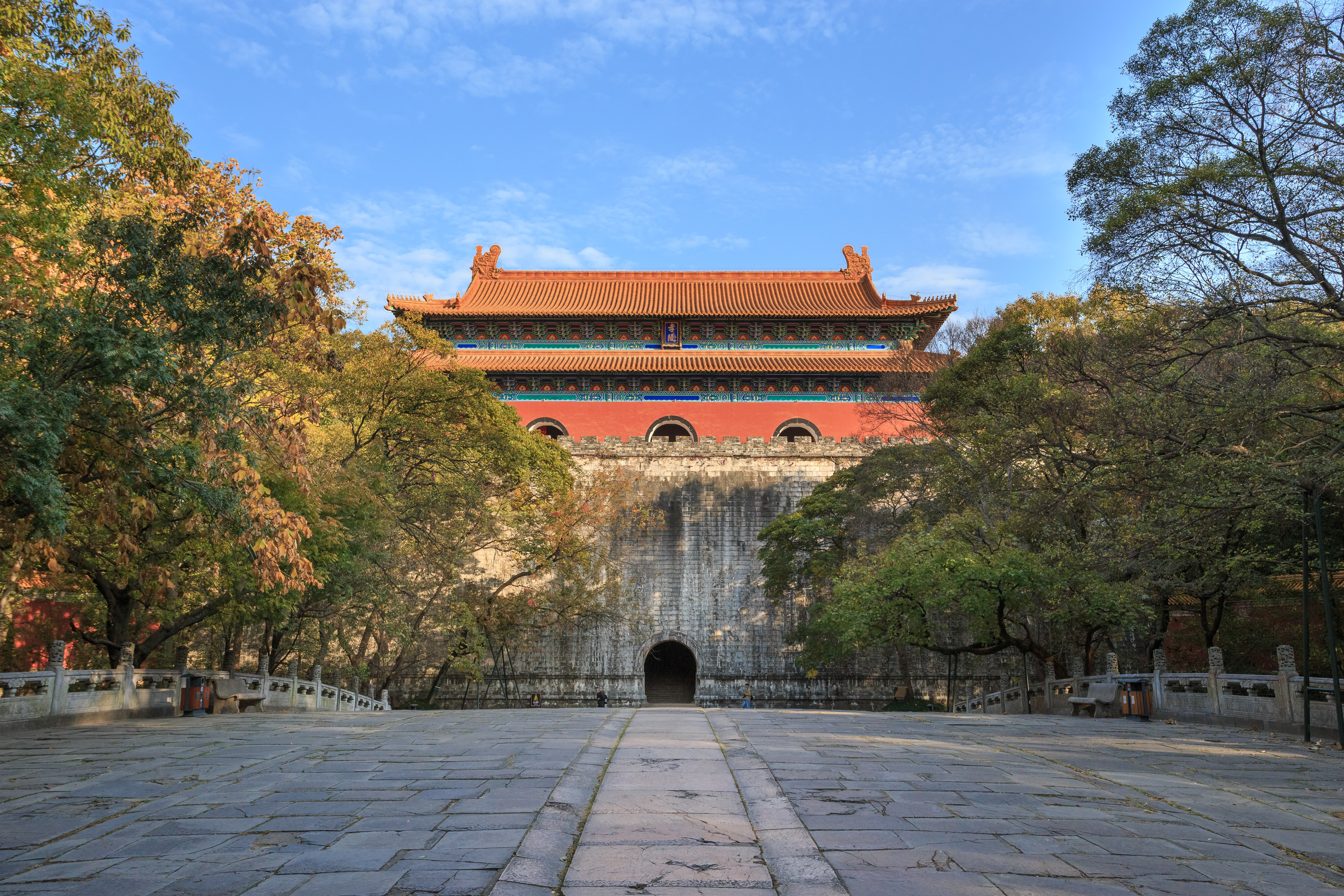
Ming Xiaoling, mausoleum of the Hongwu Emperor, founder of the Ming dynasty

==== Early Ming ====
In 1356, Zhu Yuanzhang captured Jiqing Circuit and reorganized it as Yingtian (應天, lit. "Responding to Heaven") Prefecture, though the city still nominally served as the Jiangnan provincial capital under Han Lin'er. In 1368, he ascended the throne there as the Hongwu Emperor, establishing the Ming dynasty.

Planning for the capital's layout had begun as early as 1366. By the late 14th century, the city's physical form was established in four nested zones: the Forbidden City, the Imperial City, the Capital City, and the Outer Enclosure. The Capital City wall exceeded 30 kilometers, while the Outer Enclosure—a series of earthworks and gates protecting the suburbs—covered approximately 230 km^{2} (89 sq mi).

Around 3,000 corvée laborers were levied from Shangyuan and Jiangning counties to supply firewood for the metropolitan region's dense population. By 1391, the permanent population within the Outer Enclosure was estimated to have reached between 900,000 and one million.

Yet well into the late Hongwu reign, the court remained divided over whether Nanjing should be the permanent capital; proposals to relocate the seat of empire to Zhongdu (Fengyang) or traditional northern capitals were abandoned in 1375 and 1392, respectively.

In 1402, Zhu Di seized Nanjing during the Jingnan Campaign and assumed the throne as the Yongle Emperor. In 1421, he relocated the capital to his former princedom of Beiping, which he renamed Beijing. This move prompted a massive outflow of soldiers, artisans, corvée laborers, and merchants, reducing Nanjing's registered population to between 200,000 and 300,000.

Yongle's successor, the Hongxi Emperor, attempted to restore Nanjing's primacy in 1425 by demoting Beijing to a "provisional" (行在, xingzai) capital, but he died before the plan could be implemented. The Xuande Emperor continued to treat Beijing as the de facto capital, and in 1441 the Yingzong Emperor formally dropped Beijing's xingzai prefix, leaving Nanjing as the secondary capital.

Nanjing retained a parallel but primarily symbolic set of government ministries. The number of ranked officials and clerks in Nanjing was fewer than in their Beijing counterparts, and the jurisdiction of many agencies in Nanjing was restricted to the south or even solely to the Nanzhil (Southern Metropolitan Region).

The early Ming court also launched major construction projects to project imperial legitimacy, including the Ming Xiaoling mausoleum and the Glazed Pagoda of the Great Bao'en Temple (the "Porcelain Tower").

Nanjing also served as a center for international relations through the tributary system and maritime expeditions; its Longjiang (龍江) shipyard reached peak output under the Yongle Emperor, constructing vessels for the Treasure Fleet, while the Interpreters Institute (會同館, Huitong Guan, which served as a state guesthouse) hosted foreign envoys, including the Sultan of Boni who died during a state visit in 1408 and was buried in the city.

==== Mid-to-Late Ming ====
Following the northward shift of the imperial court, Nanjing entered a prolonged transition, eventually transforming into a thriving commercial and cultural metropolis by the mid-Ming dynasty. As state-run craft industries declined, private enterprises in silk-weaving, fan-making, and commercial publishing flourished, while a popular entertainment district emerged along the southern Qinhuai River, drawing many literati.

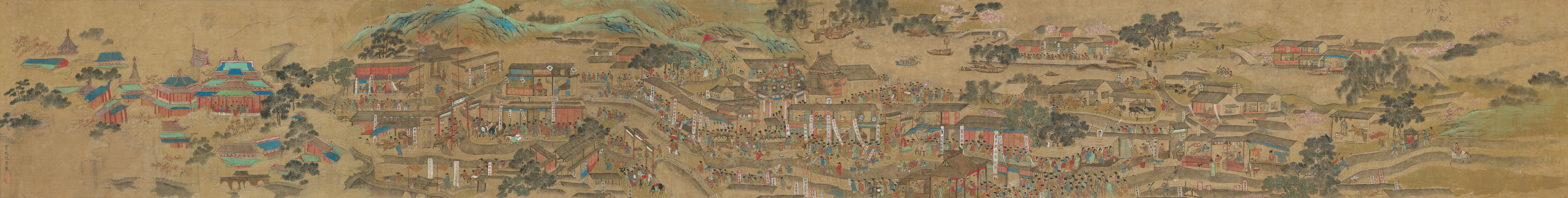
The Bustling and Hustling of Nanjing-handscroll (zh:南都繁会图), traditionally attributed to Qiu Ying

As part of this commercial expansion, Nanjing issued yin certificates to salt merchants, on presentation of which they were authorized to redeem them for salt at various salt fields. In the year 1549, more than one million certificates were printed and issued, each authorizing the bearer to purchase 400 catties of salt.

Besides, the city's palace storehouses remained major logistical hubs, storing large quantities of imported commodities like pepper and sappanwood for northward transport, and delivered to Beijing the tribute articles that had been collected and concentrated here from various parts of the south.

Compared to its peak force of approximately 120,000 garrison troops during the Ming, the soldiers enrolled in the Nanjing divisions numbered slightly more than 36,000 in 1519, and by 1583, this figure had dropped to only about 20,000. During this period of decline, a sharp spike in rice prices and cuts to military subsidies triggered the Zhenwu Regiment mutiny of 1561, during which soldiers killed the Nanjing Vice Minister of Revenue before the court pacified the troops with direct cash disbursements.

In the late 16th century, Jesuit missionaries led by Matteo Ricci established a presence in the city. However, subsequent friction with local authorities led to the Nanjing Incident of 1616–1617, which resulted in the expulsion of several Jesuits to Macao and temporarily drove Christian practices underground.

By the late Ming, Nanjing had emerged as a secondary center of factional politics outside Beijing. In 1638, over 140 literati affiliated with the reformist Restoration Society (Fushe) signed the "Proclamation to Guard against Disorder in the Subordinate Capital" (留都防亂公揭, Liudu Fangluan Gongjie), opposing the political rehabilitation of Ruan Dacheng due to his historical ties to the eunuch faction. This factional strife persisted into the subsequent Southern Ming court, which was dominated by Ma Shiying and Ruan.

Following the fall of Beijing in the spring of 1644, the Prince of Fu, Zhu Yousong, was enthroned in Nanjing in June as the Hongguang Emperor, establishing the Southern Ming. In late May of the following year, after Qing forces secured control of the region north of the Yangtze, the emperor abandoned the capital. In the resulting leadership vacuum, local residents looted the Ming palace and released a claimant to the title of the Chongzhen Emperor's crown prince from prison, placing him on the throne. However, senior officials surrendered to the Qing forces just days later, and Dodo's army entered the city on June 6.

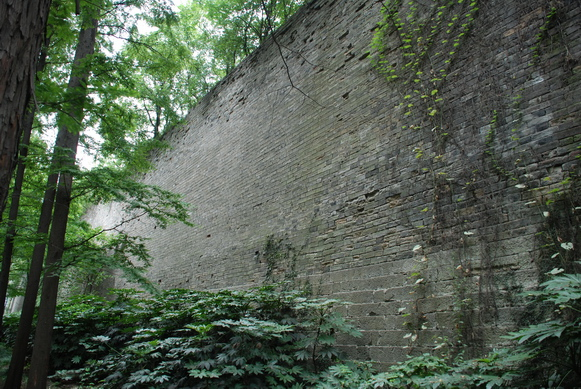
Nanjing City Wall near Xuanwumen Gate

==== Early-to-Mid Qing ====
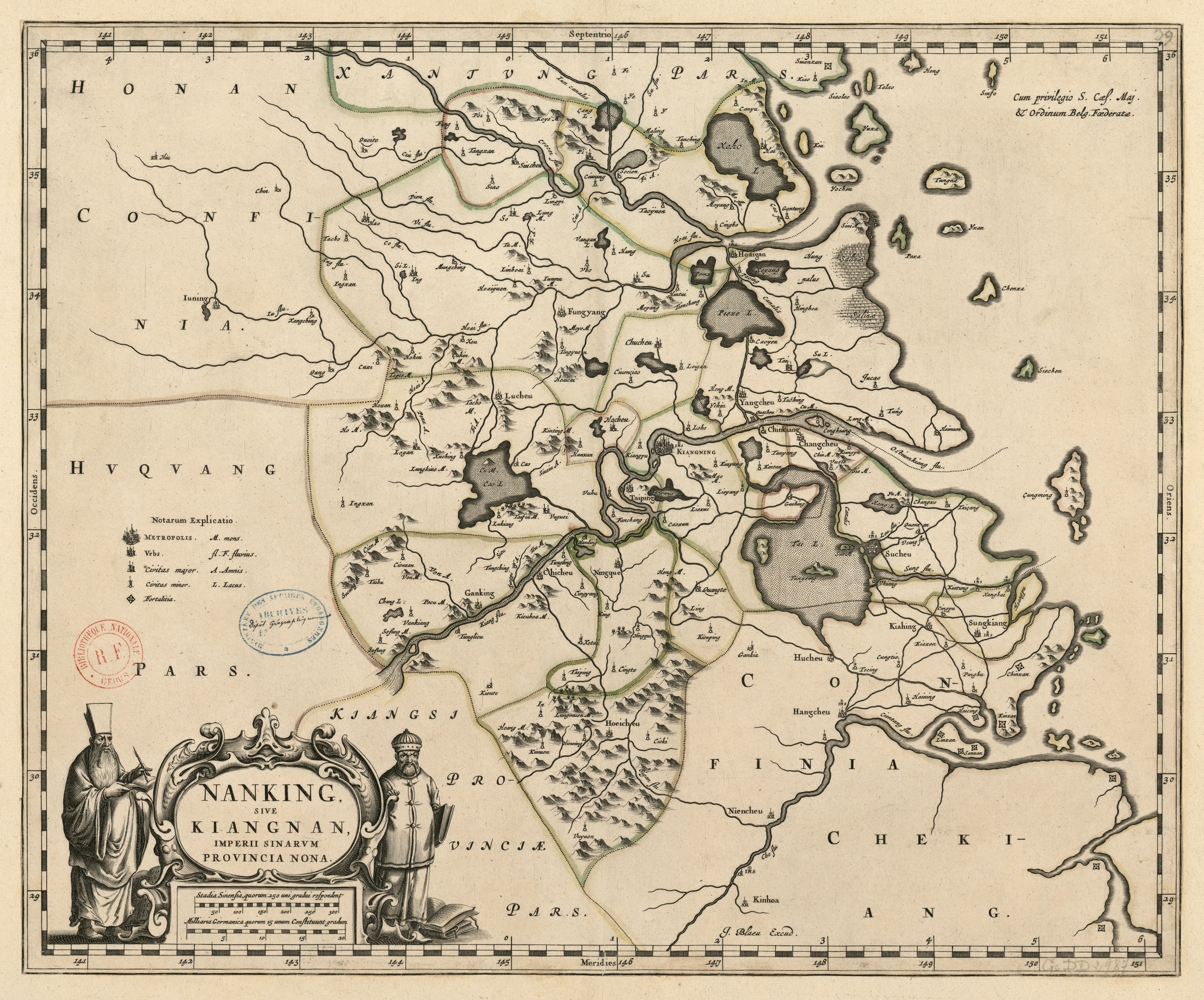
Nanking sive Kiangnan ("Nanjing or Jiangnan"), the 9th provincial map of the Chinese Empire in Martino Martini and Joan Blaeu's 1655 Novus Atlas Sinensis ("New Chinese Atlas"). Under the Qing, Nanjing continued to oversee the territory of Ming Nanzhili as Jiangnan until its division into the provinces of Jiangsu and Anhui.

Following the Qing conquest, Yingtian was renamed Jiangning, although foreign sources continued to refer to the city as Nanking. The Nanzhili was reorganized as Jiangnan Province, with Jiangning serving as the seat of the Governor-General of Liangjiang. The Jiangnan Administration Commissioner, later the Jiangsu Administration Commissioner, relocated to Suzhou in 1661, while the Anhui Commissioner temporarily remained in Jiangning. In 1760, a separate Jiangning Commissioner was established to administer Jiangning and northern Jiangsu, and the Anhui office was permanently moved to Anqing.

To consolidate its rule, the Qing court established a walled Manchu City within eastern Jiangning in 1649, repurposing the former Ming palace grounds and separating the Eight Banner garrison from the Han population's residential quarter. The banner forces dominated the city's defenses and controlled substantial landholdings: Purple Mountain served as military pastureland, while Bagua Island in the Yangtze supplied reeds for fuel. In the summer of 1659, Qing forces repelled a massive siege launched by the Ming loyalist commander Zheng Chenggong.

During the High Qing era, Jiangning remained a major textile and commercial center, with the number of private satin looms estimated to have exceeded 30,000 at its peak. The Imperial Silk Manufactory, managed by imperial bondservants, operated only a small fraction of these looms. Its superintendents also served as confidential informants for the emperor, while its yamen functioned as a temporary palace during imperial tours of the south.

The city was also the lower Yangtze's leading timber transshipment center. At the Longjiang Customs station, duties on timber and charcoal accounted for more than half of annual receipts in most years, reaching 109,564 taels in 1755.

Jiangning remained an important center of scholarship and education. During Yao Nai's long tenure at Zhongshan Academy (鐘山書院), the city became a center of activity for the Tongcheng school. The Jiangnan examination compound, located in the southern part of the city, expanded its capacity from 7,500 candidates in 1630 to 17,000 by 1850, drawing applicants from both Jiangsu and Anhui.

The city also supported a substantial culture of elite sociability and patronage. After his retirement, Yuan Mei made Suiyuan (隨園, Garden of Contentment) in the northwest his residence, where he accepted dozens of women from elite families as disciples. In the southern district, the Gan family built a large residential compound of more than three hundred rooms, later associated with the preservation of Kunqu opera, and established the Jindai Library (津逮樓).

In August 1842, after capturing Zhenjiang, British forces advanced up the Yangtze and anchored their fleet off Jiangning. Facing imminent bombardment, the Qing court signed the Treaty of Nanking, ending the First Opium War, aboard the British warship HMS Cornwallis at Xiaguan in the city's western suburbs.

==== Taiping Rebellion ====
In March 1853, Taiping forces captured the city. The Manchu garrison and its families, along with Qing officials and local militia, suffered heavy casualties through combat, suicide, and executions by Taiping forces, who denounced them as "Qing demons." Renamed Tianjing, or "Heavenly Capital," the city became the capital of the Taiping Heavenly Kingdom. Hong Xiuquan converted the former Governor-General's yamen into his palace.

The regime attempted radical social reforms in the capital, segregating residents by sex into occupational units known as guan and operating a large-scale Bible-printing enterprise. Many Buddhist and Taoist temples were destroyed, converted, or stripped of their religious images, while clergy faced persecution. Large-scale civilian flight and the internal violence of the Tianjing Incident in 1856 further reduced the city's population.

In 1856 and again in 1860, Taiping armies defeated the Qing Southern Camp (Jiangnan Daying) stationed east of the city. From May 1862, Zeng Guoquan's Xiang Army mounted a final, protracted siege that severed the city's supply lines. When the city fell in July 1864, Qing forces engaged in widespread looting, arson, and killing, causing heavy casualties and destroying large parts of the city, including the Taiping palaces. Zeng Guofan subsequently established the Governor-General's headquarters on the site of the ruined palace complex.

==== Late Qing modernization ====
In 1865, Macartney's works was relocated to Nanjing, known as and was given the title of Nanking Manufacturing Bureau or Nanking Arsenal. Since 1866 when Zeng assumed the post of Governor-General, the office was held concurrently with that of the Superintendent of Trade for the Southern Ports.

Under the Treaty of Tientsin, Nanjing was designated as a treaty port. However, due to the Taiping Rebellion and subsequent unrest, the city did not officially open to foreign trade until the late 19th century, at which time the Nanking Customs was established at Xiaguan.

The New York Methodist Mission Society's superintendent Virgil Hart arrived in Nanjing in 1881, he succeeded in buying land near the city's Southern Gate and Confucian Temple to build the city's first Methodist church. In 1888, Northern Methodists founded Nanking University in the city. In 1909, it merged with Union Christian College to form the University of Nanking. Drum Tower Hospital was established in 1892 by Dr. William E. Macklin, the first missionary sent to China by the Christian Church.

At the turn of the 20th century, Nanjing emerged as a major center for modern education in the lower Yangtze. Several institutions established during this period included the Kiangnan Naval Academy (1890) and the Kiangnan Military Academy (1895). In 1902, the Kiangnan Higher School opened on the former site of the Zhongshan Academy, followed by the establishment of the San Kiang Normal College (1903) and the Chi-Nan Academy (1906), which was founded to educate the children of overseas Chinese. By 1910, the city's primary education system had expanded to 94 lower elementary schools.

From June to November 1910, Nanjing hosted the Nanyang Industrial Exhibition, the largest exposition of the late Qing dynasty. Although initiated by the government, the event relied primarily on financial backing from chambers of commerce in Jiangsu and Zhejiang, as well as overseas Chinese merchants from Southeast Asia. In addition to promoting industry and reform, the exhibition aimed to stimulate the development of the Nanjing area. As a result, the city's electric lighting, telephone networks, hotels, and railway connections were expanded, and several organizations established for the exhibition persisted long after its conclusion.

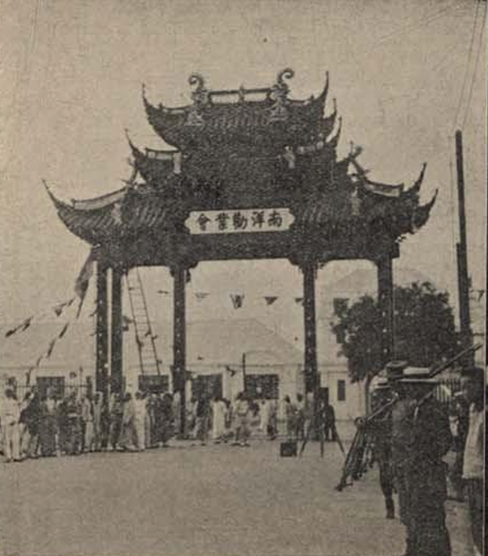
The Archway of the Nanyang Industrial Exhibition

=== Republican era ===
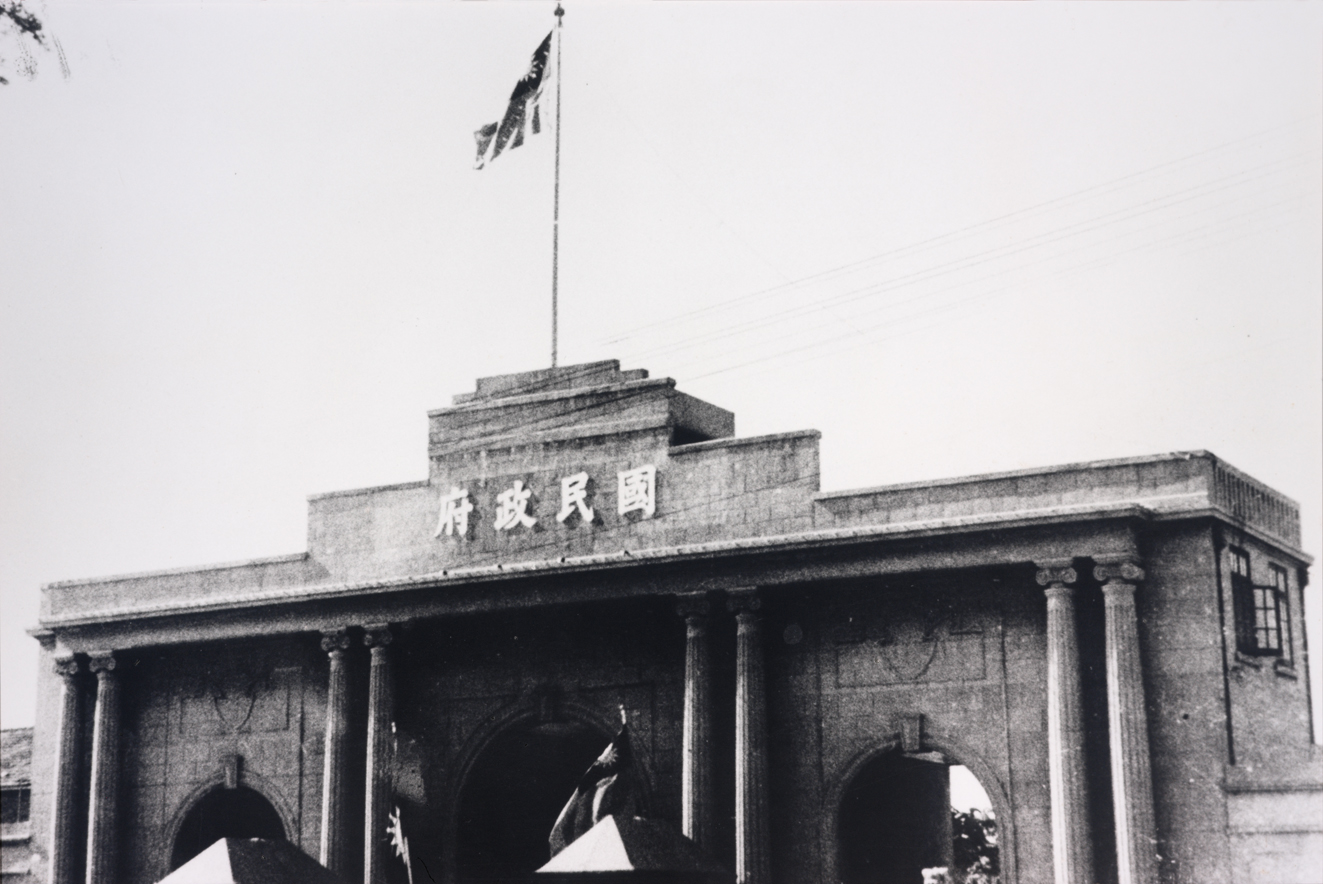
The Presidential Palace of the National Government of the Republic of China in Nanjing, 1927

Following the Xinhai Revolution, the Governor of Jiangsu, based in Suzhou, declared the province's independence on November 5, 1911. Loyalist general Zhang Xun held Nanjing against revolutionary forces until the United Jiangsu–Zhejiang Army besieged the city and forced his retreat on December 2. On December 29, delegates from the independent provinces elected Sun Yat-sen provisional president in Nanjing; he was sworn in on January 1, 1912, marking the establishment of the Republic of China.

After the abdication of the Qing emperor, Sun resigned on February 13 in favour of Yuan Shikai, stipulating that the new president assume office in Nanjing and uphold the provisional constitutional order. Yuan resisted the demand to travel south, and the Beijing mutiny of February 29 provided a pretext for him to remain in the north. The provisional government was subsequently relocated to Beijing, ending Nanjing's brief tenure as the republican capital.

During the ensuing Warlord Era, Nanjing changed hands repeatedly. It was sacked by Zhang Xun's troops during the Second Revolution in September 1913 and later served as the headquarters of Sun Chuanfang's "League of Five Provinces". In March 1927, the National Revolutionary Army captured the city during the Northern Expedition. Its entry was marred by the Nanjing Incident of 1927, involving attacks on foreign residents, consulates, and missions, which prompted British and American warships to bombard parts of the city.

On April 1, 1927, the Kuomintang Jiangsu Provincial Headquarters moved to Nanjing. On April 9, right-wing KMT factions attacked left-wing provincial and municipal party headquarters and the General Labor Union, arresting and executing several cadres in violence that continued through April 11. On April 18, a faction aligned with Chiang Kai-shek established the National Government in the city, which eventually asserted dominance over competing factions in Wuhan and Shanghai. On June 1, Nanjing was designated a Special Municipality and formally declared the national capital.

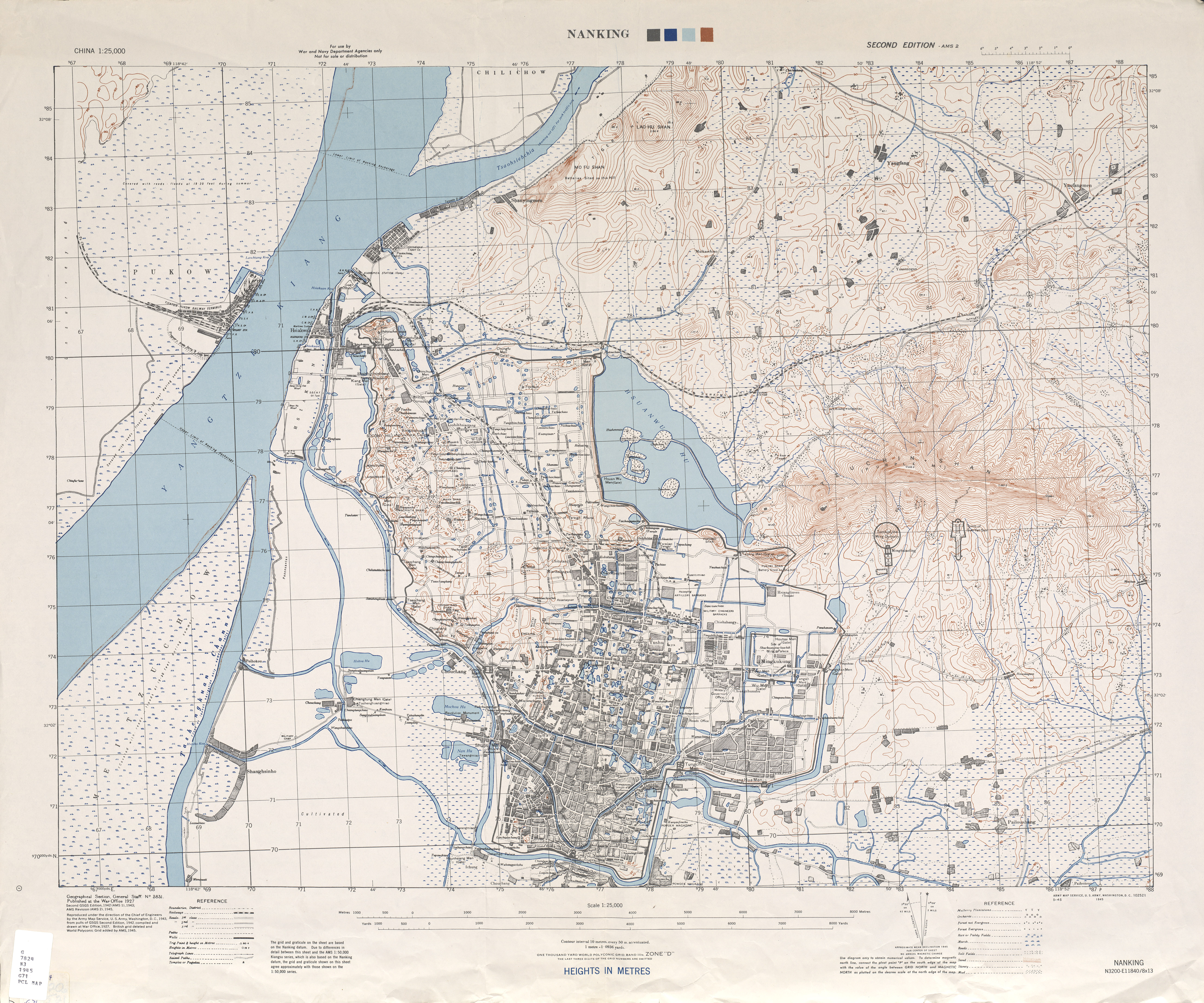
Nanking, 1927. Map compiled by the British War Office/U.S. Army Map Service.

The new regime launched the Capital Plan (首都計劃), an ambitious urban modernization scheme developed with the assistance of American architect Henry Murphy. A central feature was the 12-kilometre Zhongshan Road axis, a 40-metre-wide thoroughfare connecting the riverfront at Xiaguan Pier to the Sun Yat-sen Mausoleum. The project required large-scale land requisitions and demolitions; prolonged delays in compensation provoked protests from local merchants and residents.

Urban expansion was accompanied by administrative friction. Throughout the late 1920s and early 1930s, the Nanjing municipal government struggled with Jiangsu provincial authorities and Jiangning County over tax revenues and jurisdictional boundaries. The city's territory was officially enlarged from 157 to about 466 square kilometres in 1935. During the "Nanjing Decade", the city became a centre of research and education, home to National Central University, Academia Sinica, and the Purple Mountain Observatory. Political control, however, remained tight: the Xiaozhuang School (曉莊學校), founded by Tao Xingzhi to promote rural education, was forcibly closed in 1930 by government order, largely due to official concerns over its socially radical potential.

Social stratification remained acute, with a 1934 survey finding that approximately 45.1 per cent of households lived in shantytowns concentrated primarily in the southern and western districts and the northern outskirts of Xiaguan, while nearly 28 per cent of residents were officially registered without occupations, a diverse group ranging from the destitute and institutionalized to the very wealthy. At the same time, Nanjing functioned as the hub of the Nationalist security apparatus, including organizations such as the Blue Shirts Society and the Central Bureau of Investigation and Statistics.

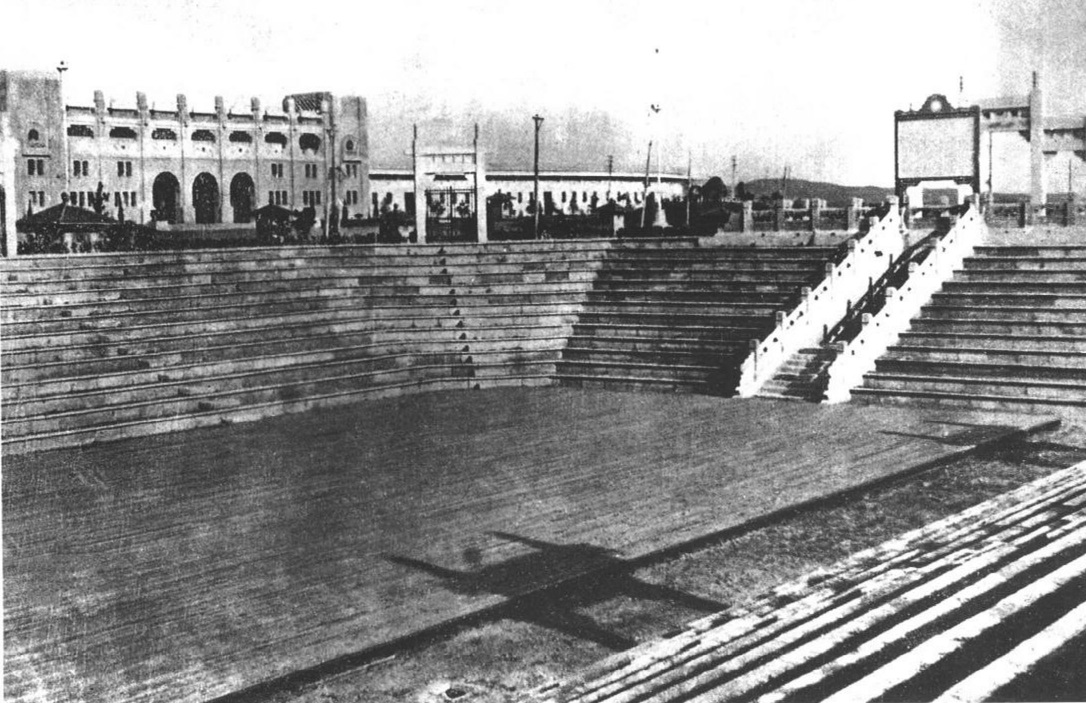
The basketball court of Nanjing Central Stadium, c. 1930

Although urban industrialization remained limited, the "Greater Nanjing" plan designated the riverfront as a heavy industrial zone. Notably, Yongli Chemical Industry Company's ammonia factory (永利錏厰) was established with government support in Luhe. Beginning operations in early 1937, the plant produced daily averages of 150 tons of ammonium sulfate and 40 tons of nitric acid by that summer. During the subsequent conflict, its chemical production capacity led to it being targeted by Japanese aerial bombardment.

Japanese naval aircraft began heavily bombing Nanjing on August 15. On August 21, the diplomatic representatives of the United States, Great Britain, France, Germany, and Italy in Nanjing jointly requested that the Japanese government instruct its bombers to avoid a specified area containing foreign embassies and shipping anchorages. The Japanese Foreign Ministry declined, stating that the area contained Chinese military establishments. The Japanese Third Fleet commander warned on September 19 that air operations would commence on September 21 and demanded the evacuation of foreign nationals and warships. The United States Asiatic Fleet refused to withdraw, notifying the Japanese command that its gunboats would remain at Nanjing to protect the embassy and remaining civilians. On September 22, the U.S. government formally protested the plan, stating it would jeopardize American lives and was contrary to the principles of law and humanity.

As Japanese forces advanced rapidly into the Yangtze delta after the fall of Shanghai, the Chinese National Government began relocating its ministries and offices to the southwestern city of Chongqing in November to sustain long-term resistance.

After Japanese forces breached the designated lines of defense and converged on the capital from three directions, the Imperial General Headquarters in Tokyo issued the order for a concentrated assault on Nanjing on December 1. Generalissimo Chiang Kai-shek and the Military Affairs Commission evacuated to Wuhan on December 7. The defense of the city was left to General Tang Shengzhi, who eventually ordered a disorganized and chaotic retreat on December 12 amid the collapse of Chinese defensive lines. On that same day, Japanese aircraft bombed and sank the USS Panay, a U.S. Navy gunboat evacuating foreign diplomats and civilians along the Yangtze River, triggering a major diplomatic crisis.

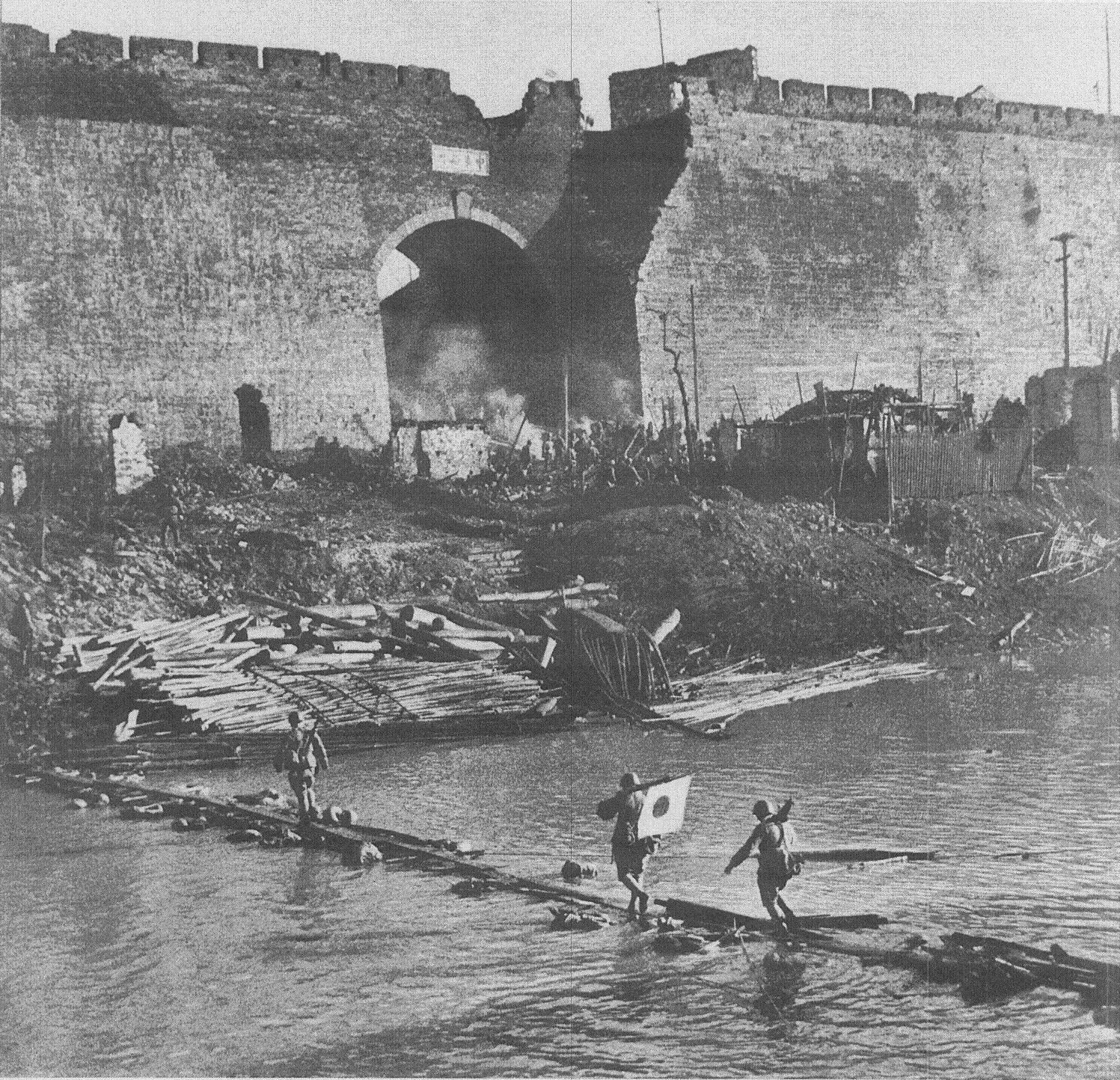
Japanese soldiers entering the walled city of Nanjing through the Gate of China

The city fell to the Japanese military on December 13. Over the following six weeks, occupying Japanese troops carried out the systematic and brutal Nanjing Massacre (the "Rape of Nanjing"). The total death toll, including estimates made by the International Military Tribunal for the Far East and the Nanjing War Crimes Tribunal, was between 300,000 and 350,000. The city itself was also severely damaged during the massacre.

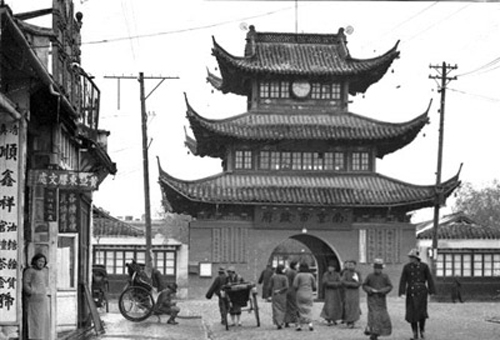
The Nanjing Municipal Government during the Republic of China period (1927–1949).

In 1940, a Japanese-collaborationist government known as the "Nanjing Regime" or "Reorganized National Government of China" led by Wang Jingwei was established in Nanjing as a rival to Chiang Kai-shek's government in Chongqing. In 1946, after the Surrender of Japan, the KMT relocated its central government back to Nanjing.

=== People's Republic ===
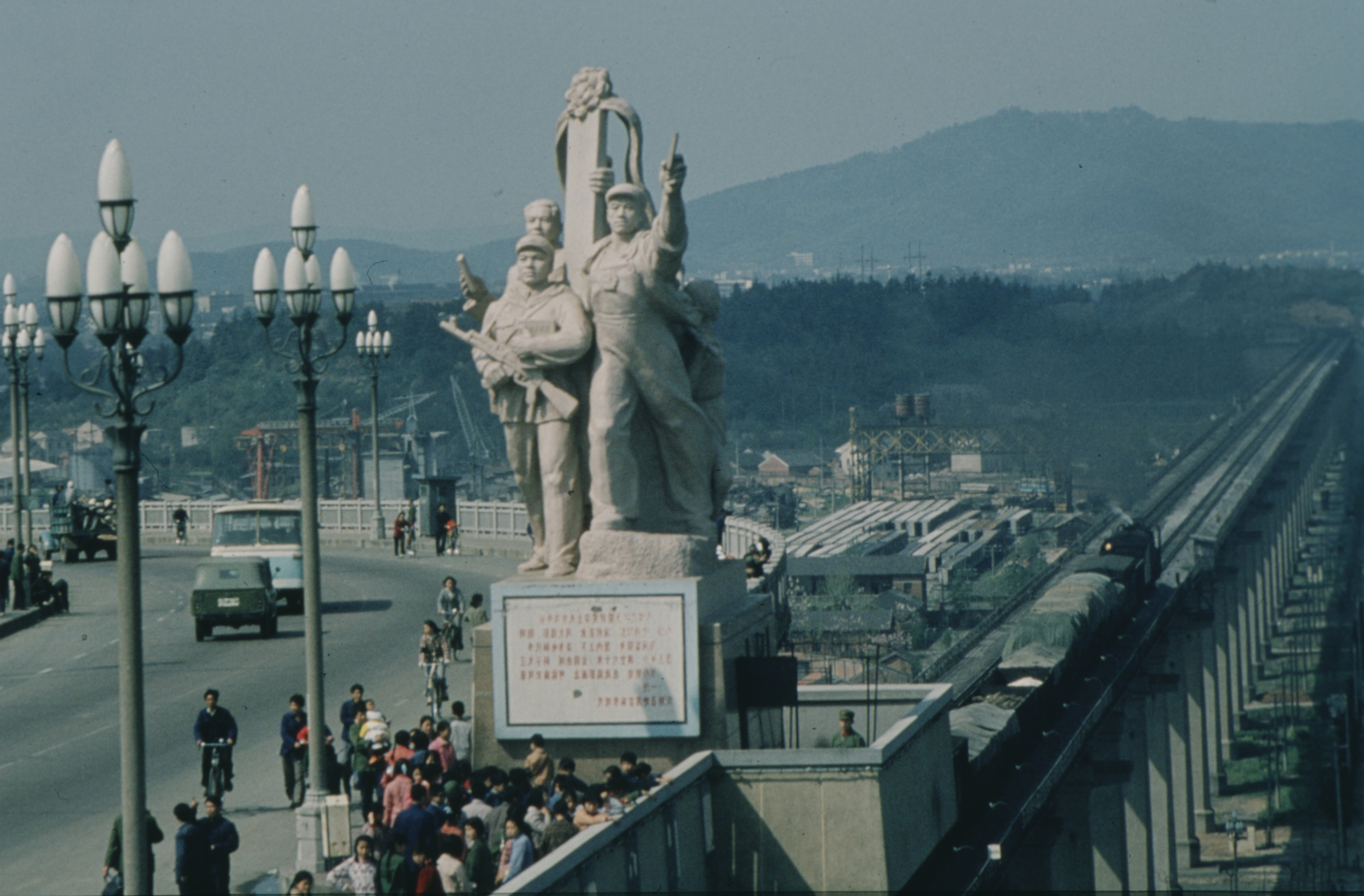
Nanjing Yangtze River Bridge approach, photographed in 1982

In April 1949, Communist forces crossed the Yangtze River and the Communist People's Liberation Army (PLA) captured Nanjing. The KMT government retreated to Canton (Guangzhou) until October 15, Chongqing until November 25, and then Chengdu before retreating to the island of Taiwan on December 10 where Taipei was proclaimed the temporary capital of the Republic of China. By late 1949, the PLA was pursuing remnants of KMT forces southwards in southern China, and only Tibet and Hainan Island were left.

After the establishment of the People's Republic of China in October 1949, Nanjing was initially a province-level municipality, but it was soon merged into Jiangsu and again became the provincial capital by replacing Zhenjiang which was transferred in 1928, and retains that status to this day.

== Geography ==
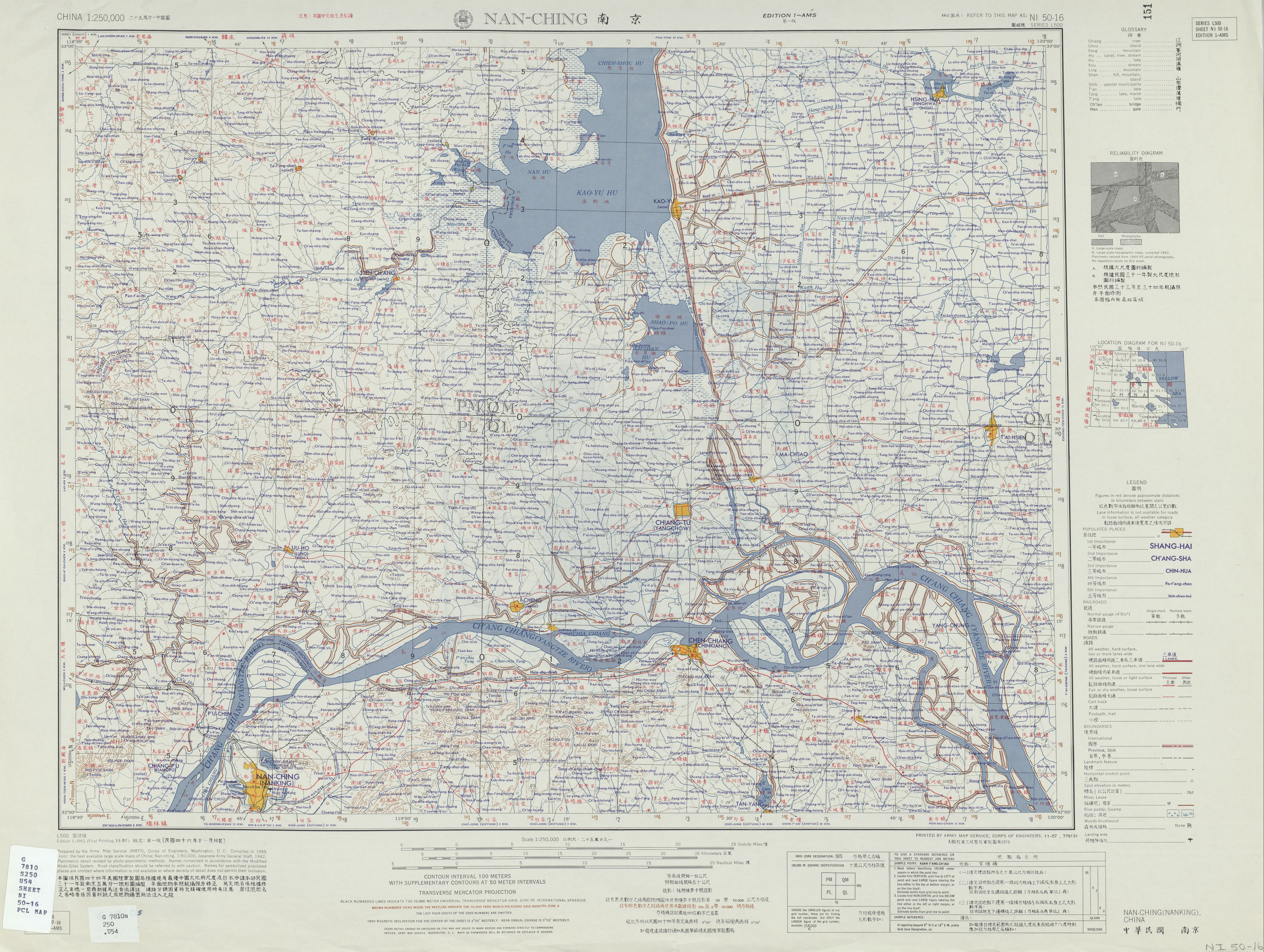
1955 AMS map of the area around the still walled city of Nanjing, labelled "Nan-ching (Nanking)"

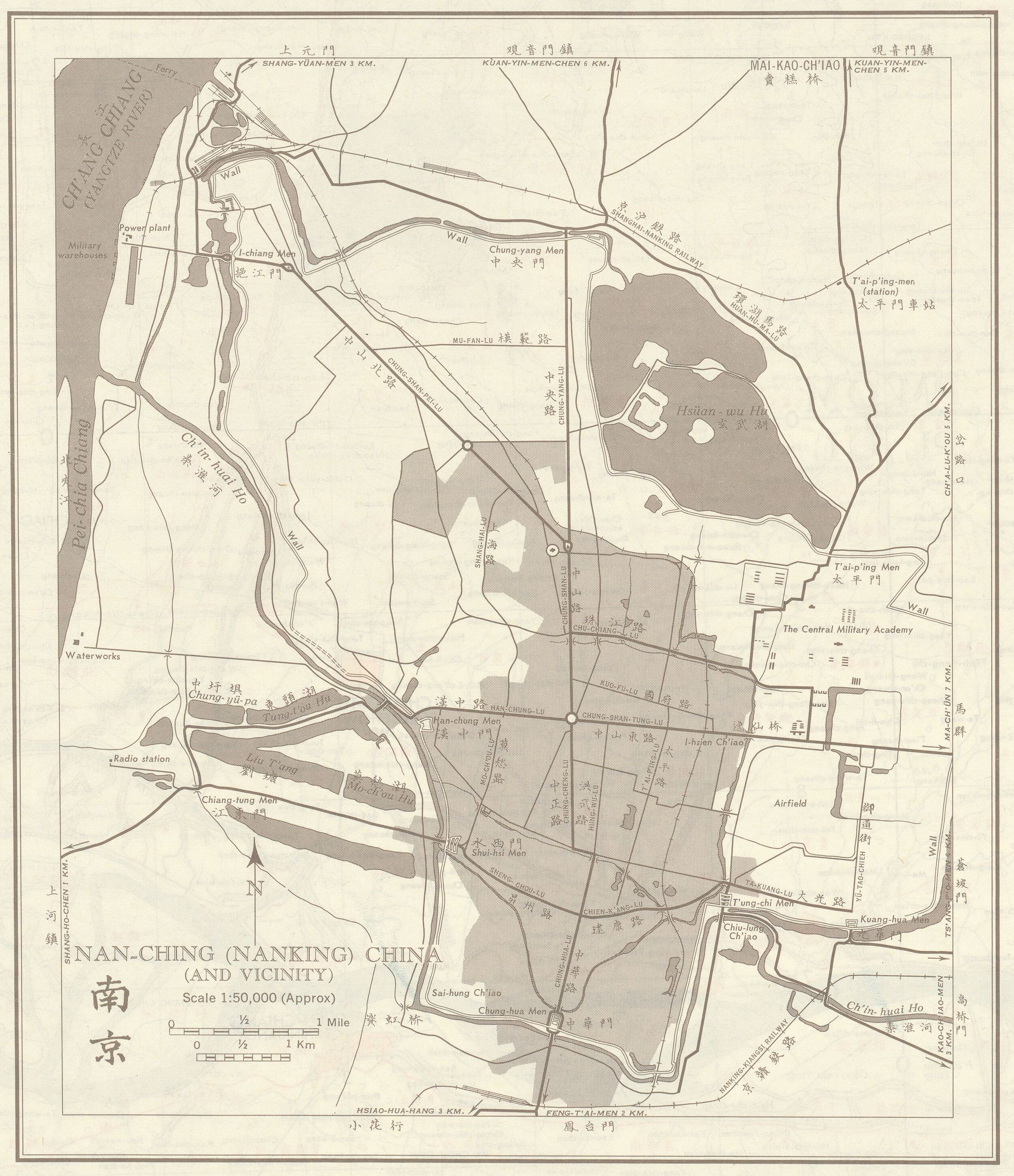
1955 AMS detail map of Nanjing, again labelled "Nan-ching (Nanking)"

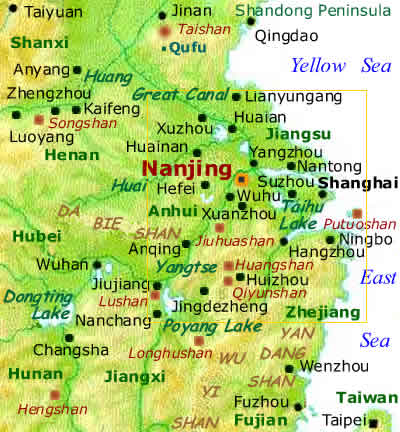
Nanjing Region – Lower Yangtze Basin and Eastern China.

Nanjing, with a total land area of 6,598 square kilometres (2,548 sq mi), is situated in the heartland of the drainage area of the lower reaches of the Yangtze River, and in the Yangtze River Delta, one of the largest economic zones of China. The Yangtze River flows past the west side and then the north side of Nanjing City, while the Ningzheng Ridge surrounds the north, east and south sides of the city. The city is 650 kilometres (400 mi) southeast of Luoyang, 900 kilometres (560 mi) south-southeast of Beijing, 270 kilometres (170 mi) west-northwest of Shanghai, and 1,200 kilometres (750 mi) east-northeast of Chongqing. The Yangtze flows downstream from Jiujiang, Jiangxi, through Anhui and Jiangsu to the East China Sea. The northern part of the lower Yangtze drainage basin is the Huai River basin and the southern part is the Zhe River basin. They are connected by the Grand Canal east of Nanjing. The area around Nanjing is called Xiajiang (下江, Downstream River) region, with Jianghuai dominant in the northern part and Jiangzhe dominant in the southern part. (Note: Huai (Huai of Jianghuai 江淮) is a big river north of Jiang (the river Yangtze), and the Zhe (Zhe of Jiangzhe 江浙)) is a big river south of Jiang.) The region is also well known as Dongnan (东南, South East, the Southeast) and Jiangnan (江南, and River South, South of Yangtze). (Note: The areas covered by such geographical names as Jiangnan, Dongnan and Xiajiang are not precisely defined. In ancient times the area was known as Yangchow (揚州). Sometimes the term Jianghai (江海) is used because the region is where the Jiang (Yangtze, river) empties into the Hai (sea).)

Nanjing borders Yangzhou to the northeast; Zhenjiang to the east; and Changzhou to the southeast. On its western boundary is Anhui, where Nanjing borders five prefecture-level cities: Chuzhou to the northwest, Wuhu, Chaohu, and Ma'anshan to the west and Xuancheng to the southwest.

=== Climate and environment ===
Nanjing

Climate chart (precipitation, max. and min. temperature)
J	F	M	A	M	J	J	A	S	O	N	D
50 7 0	54 10 2	80 15 6	82 21 12	84 27 17	193 29 21	227 32 25	159 32 25	73 28 20	56 23 14	52 17 8	35 10 2
- █ Average max. and min. temperatures in °C
- █ Precipitation totals in mm
- Source: CMA
Imperial conversion
J	F	M	A	M	J	J	A	S	O	N	D
2 45 32	2.1 50 36	3.1 59 43	3.2 71 53	3.3 80 63	7.6 85 71	8.9 90 77	6.2 89 77	2.9 82 69	2.2 73 58	2.1 62 46	1.4 50 35
- █ Average max. and min. temperatures in °F
- █ Precipitation totals in inches

Nanjing has a humid subtropical climate (Köppen Cfa) and is influenced by the East Asian monsoon. The four seasons are distinct, with damp conditions seen throughout the year, very hot and muggy summers, cold, damp winters, and in between, spring and autumn are of reasonable length. Along with Chongqing and Wuhan, Nanjing is traditionally referred to as one of the "Three Furnaces" along the Yangtze River for the perennially high temperatures in the summertime. However, the time from mid-June to the end of July is the plum blossom blooming season in which the meiyu (rainy season of East Asia; literally "plum rain") occurs, during which the city experiences a period of mild rain as well as dampness. The northeast wind prevails in winter.

Despite being called one of the "Three Furnaces", Nanjing has a cold climate for its latitude. Nanjing's winter temperatures are similar to, or lower than, those of London, and Nanjing's January is 2 °C colder to London's January, despite the fact that Nanjing is on 32°04'N and London is on 51°30'N. Comparing to the East coast of USA which has the same humid subtropical climate, Nanjing's winter is 7 °C colder than the winter of Savannah, Georgia.

The average temperature in January is 3.1 °C (37.6 °F), and the extreme daily minimum temperature is −14.0 °C (6.8 °F), which occurred on January 6, 1955. The southeast wind prevails in summer, with an average temperature of 28.4 °C (83.1 °F) in July and an extreme daily maximum temperature of 43.0 °C (109.4 °F), which occurred on July 13, 1934. The number of precipitation days greater than 0.1 mm was 112.9 days, and the extreme maximum annual precipitation days were 160 days in 1957. The average annual precipitation is 1,144 millimetres (45.0 in).

Typhoons are uncommon but possible in the late stages of summer and early part of autumn. The annual mean temperature is around 16.4 °C (61.5 °F), with the monthly 24-hour average temperature ranging from 3.1 °C (37.6 °F) in January to 28.4 °C (83.1 °F) in July. Extremes since 1951 have ranged from −14.0 °C (7 °F) on January 6, 1955, to 40.7 °C (105 °F) on August 22, 1959. On average precipitation falls 113 days out of the year, and the average annual rainfall is 1,144 millimetres (45 in). With monthly percent possible sunshine ranging from 37 percent in June to 48 percent in August and October, the city receives 1,932.4 hours of bright sunshine annually. Nanjing is endowed with rich natural resources, which include more than 40 kinds of minerals. Among them, iron and sulfur reserves make up 40 percent of those of Jiangsu province. Its reserves of strontium rank first in East Asia and the Southeast Asia region. Nanjing also possesses abundant water resources, both from the Yangtze River and groundwater. In addition, it has several natural hot springs such as Tangshan Hot Spring in Jiangning and Tangquan Hot Spring in Pukou.

Xuanwu Lake and Mochou Lake are located in the center of the city and are easily accessible to the public, while Purple Mountain is covered with deciduous and coniferous forests preserving various historical and cultural sites. Meanwhile, a Yangtze River deep-water channel is under construction to enable Nanjing to handle the navigation of 50,000 DWT vessels from the East China Sea.

Climate data for Nanjing, elevation 35 m (115 ft), (1991–2020 normals, extremes 1951–present)
Month	Jan	Feb	Mar	Apr	May	Jun	Jul	Aug	Sep	Oct	Nov	Dec	Year
Record high °C (°F)	21.4 (70.5)	27.7 (81.9)	33.2 (91.8)	34.2 (93.6)	37.5 (99.5)	38.1 (100.6)	40.0 (104.0)	40.7 (105.3)	39.0 (102.2)	38.1 (100.6)	29.2 (84.6)	23.1 (73.6)	40.7 (105.3)
Mean maximum °C (°F)	16.5 (61.7)	20.4 (68.7)	25.1 (77.2)	29.7 (85.5)	33.1 (91.6)	34.9 (94.8)	36.9 (98.4)	36.7 (98.1)	33.7 (92.7)	29.8 (85.6)	24.3 (75.7)	18.2 (64.8)	37.6 (99.7)
Mean daily maximum °C (°F)	7.4 (45.3)	10.1 (50.2)	15.1 (59.2)	21.4 (70.5)	26.6 (79.9)	29.2 (84.6)	32.4 (90.3)	31.9 (89.4)	27.9 (82.2)	22.8 (73.0)	16.6 (61.9)	10.0 (50.0)	21.0 (69.7)
Daily mean °C (°F)	3.1 (37.6)	5.6 (42.1)	10.1 (50.2)	16.2 (61.2)	21.5 (70.7)	25.0 (77.0)	28.4 (83.1)	27.9 (82.2)	23.7 (74.7)	18.0 (64.4)	11.5 (52.7)	5.4 (41.7)	16.4 (61.5)
Mean daily minimum °C (°F)	0.0 (32.0)	2.0 (35.6)	6.0 (42.8)	11.6 (52.9)	17.1 (62.8)	21.4 (70.5)	25.1 (77.2)	24.8 (76.6)	20.3 (68.5)	14.2 (57.6)	7.7 (45.9)	1.9 (35.4)	12.7 (54.8)
Mean minimum °C (°F)	−5.3 (22.5)	−3.4 (25.9)	0.4 (32.7)	5.9 (42.6)	11.8 (53.2)	17.5 (63.5)	22.0 (71.6)	21.8 (71.2)	15.6 (60.1)	9.1 (48.4)	2.1 (35.8)	−3.6 (25.5)	−6.5 (20.3)
Record low °C (°F)	−14.0 (6.8)	−13.0 (8.6)	−7.1 (19.2)	−0.2 (31.6)	5.0 (41.0)	11.8 (53.2)	16.8 (62.2)	16.9 (62.4)	7.7 (45.9)	0.2 (32.4)	−6.3 (20.7)	−13.1 (8.4)	−14.0 (6.8)
Average precipitation mm (inches)	50.2 (1.98)	53.5 (2.11)	79.7 (3.14)	82.4 (3.24)	83.8 (3.30)	193.4 (7.61)	226.8 (8.93)	158.5 (6.24)	72.9 (2.87)	55.5 (2.19)	52.3 (2.06)	35.0 (1.38)	1,144 (45.05)
Average precipitation days (≥ 0.1 mm)	9.2	8.9	10.9	9.6	9.9	10.6	11.7	12.1	7.8	7.3	7.7	7.2	112.9
Average snowy days	3.7	3.0	1.0	0.0	0.0	0.0	0.0	0.0	0.0	0.0	0.4	1.2	9.3
Average relative humidity (%)	73	71	69	68	69	76	78	79	76	73	71	73	73
Mean monthly sunshine hours	121.2	124.5	153.2	180.6	190.4	155.4	195.4	197.6	165.0	168.6	145.4	135.1	1,932.4
Percentage possible sunshine	38	40	41	46	45	37	45	48	45	48	47	43	44
Source: China Meteorological Administration all-time January high

=== Cityscape ===
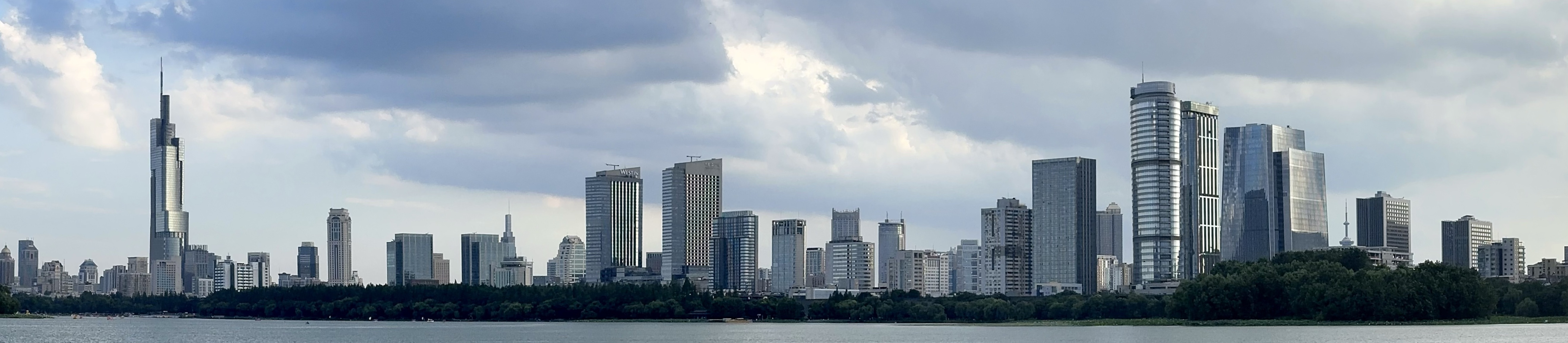
A panoramic view of central Nanjing from Nanjing Railway Station

=== Environmental issues ===
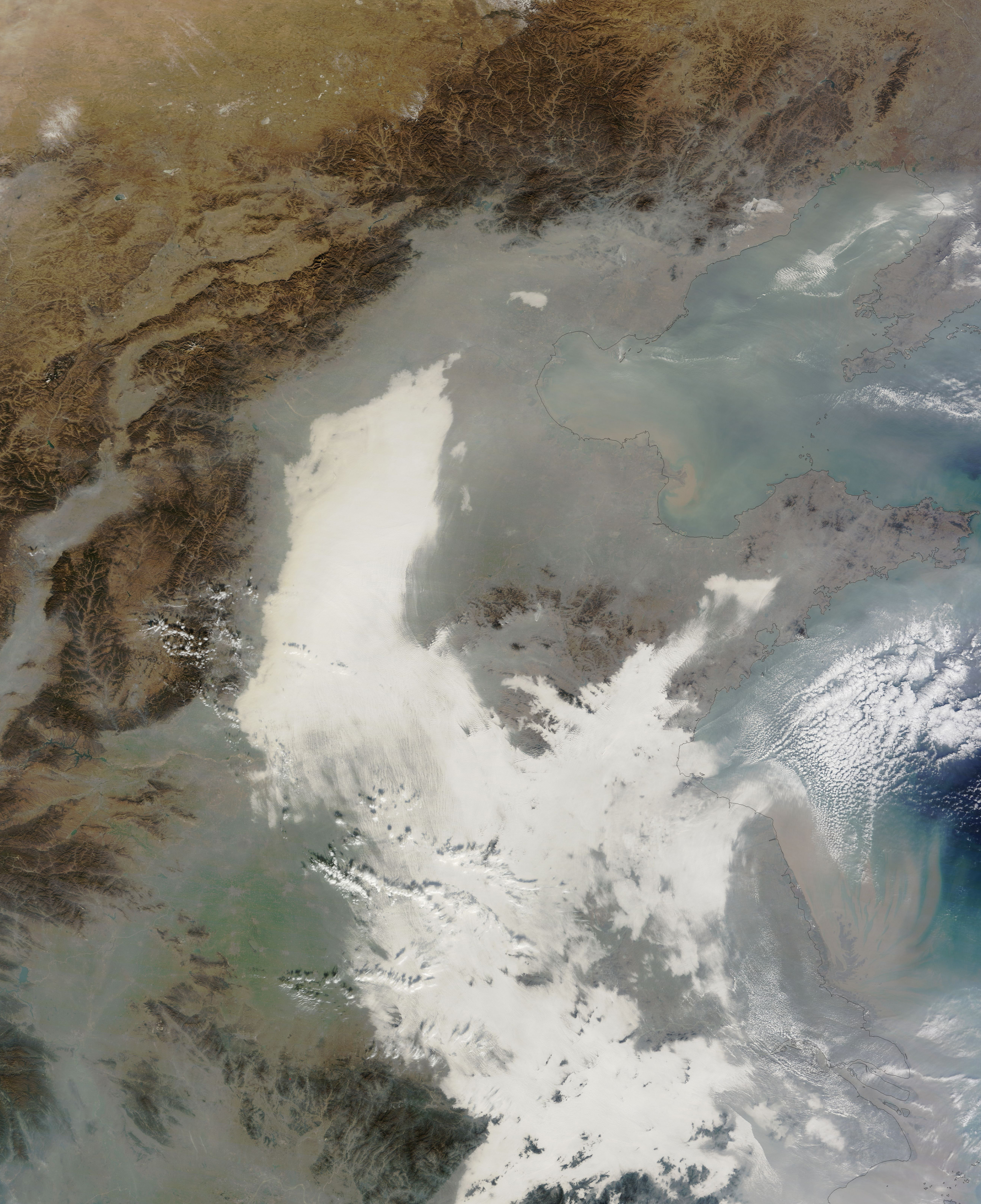
December 7, 2013, image from NASA's Terra Satellite of the Eastern China smog

A dense wave of smog began in the central and east parts of China on December 2, 2013, across a distance of around 1,200 kilometers (750 mi), including Tianjin, Hebei, Shandong, Jiangsu, Anhui, Shanghai and Zhejiang. A lack of cold air flow, combined with slow-moving air masses carrying industrial emissions, collected airborne pollutants to form a thick layer of smog over the region. The heavy smog heavily polluted central and southern Jiangsu Province, especially in and around Nanjing, with its AQI pollution Index at "severely polluted" for five straight days and "heavily polluted" for nine. Officials blamed the dense pollution on lack of wind, automobile exhaust emissions under low air pressure, and coal-powered district heating system in north China. Prevailing winds blew low-hanging air masses of factory emissions (mostly SO_{2}) towards China's east coast.

=== Soil ===
There are mainly two types of soil in Nanjing: zonal soil and cultivated soil. The zonal soil is yellow-brown soil in the northern and central areas of Nanjing, and red soil in the southern part of the border with Anhui. The cultivated soil formed by human-made farming is mainly paddy soil, and there are some yellow Gang soil and vegetable garden soil. The distribution of soil presents a certain law with the undulation of topography and hydrological conditions, which can be divided into three categories: low mountain and hilly area, hilly area and plain area. According to the second national soil survey from 1980 to 1987, the soil in Nanjing is divided into 7 soil types, 13 subtypes, 30 soil genera and 66 soil species, with a total area of 416,300 hectares.

=== Water ===
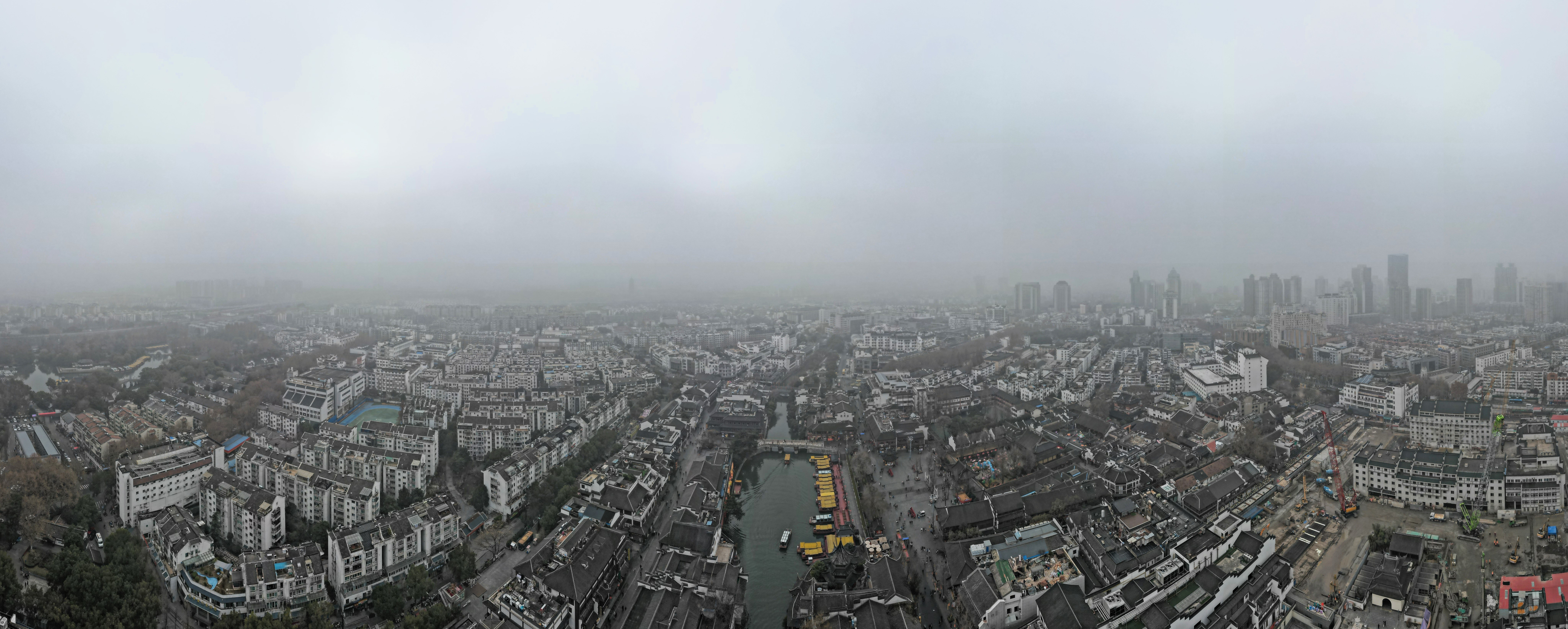
Aerial panorama of Fuzimiao and the Qinhuai River. December 2023.

Nanjing is located at the lower reaches of the Yangtze River. The Yangtze River runs diagonally across the city from southwest to northeast. It is about 93 kilometers long and more than 300 kilometers away from the sea entrance. The Qinhuai River rushes from south to north, passes through the main urban area, and joins the Yangtze River. It is known as the mother river of Nanjing. Xuanwu Lake and Mochou Lake are like two pearls embedded in the main city. The water area of the city now accounts for about 11%. The river and lake water system mainly belongs to the Yangtze River system, and only the rivers that flow into Gaoyou Lake and Baoying Lake in the northern part of Liuhe District belong to the Huai River system. The Yangtze River system includes the Qinhuai River system in the south of the Yangtze River, the Chuhe River system in the north of the Yangtze River, the riverside system formed by small rivers that flow into the river on both sides of the river, the two lakes system composed of Shijiu Lake and Gucheng Lake, and the West Taihu Lake system in the east of Gaochun. The groundwater resources are abundant and the water quality is excellent, and the Pukou Pearl Spring is particularly famous. Jiangning Tangshan and Pukou Tangquan are hot spring areas with a long history.

The Port of Nanjing is the largest inland port in China, with annual cargo tonnage reached 191,970,000 t in 2012. The port area is 98 kilometers (61 mi) in length and has 64 berths including 16 berths for ships with a tonnage of more than 10,000. Nanjing is also the biggest container port along the Yangtze River; in March 2004, the one million container-capacity base, Longtan Containers Port Area opened, further consolidating Nanjing as the leading port in the region. As of 2010, it operated six public ports and three industrial ports. The Yangtze River's 12.5-meter-deep waterway enables 50,000-ton-class ocean ships directly arrive at the Nanjing Port, and the ocean ships with the capacities of 100,000 tons or above can also reach the port after load reduction in the Yangtze River's high-tide period. CSC Jinling has a large shipyard.

=== Animal and plant resources ===
Nanjing is one of the regions with abundant plant resources and a wide variety of plants in China. The vegetation types are complex, including 7 types of natural vegetation including coniferous forest, deciduous broad-leaved forest, mixed deciduous and evergreen broad-leaved forest, bamboo forest, shrub, grass and aquatic vegetation. Cultivated vegetation includes field crops, vegetable crops, and economic forests, orchards and green belts. Seven species such as Sphaerocarpus sinensis, Chinese Allium chinense, Ming Codonopsis, and Pterocarpus sinensis are national key protected rare and endangered plants. Among wild animals, there are 795 species of insects belonging to 125 families of 11 orders. There are 99 species of fish belonging to 22 families and 12 orders. There are 327 species of terrestrial wild vertebrates belonging to 29 orders and 90 families, 243 species of birds belonging to 56 families of 17 orders, and 47 species of mammals belong to 8 orders and 22 families. Among all animal species, 9 species of wild animals under national first-level protection, such as the Oriental White Crane and White Shoulder Eagle, 65 species of wild animals under the second-level protection, such as the little swan, Chinese tiger and swallowtail, and finless porpoise, and 125 key protected animals in Jiangsu Province Species, 35 species of endangered animals.

=== Yangtze River crossings ===
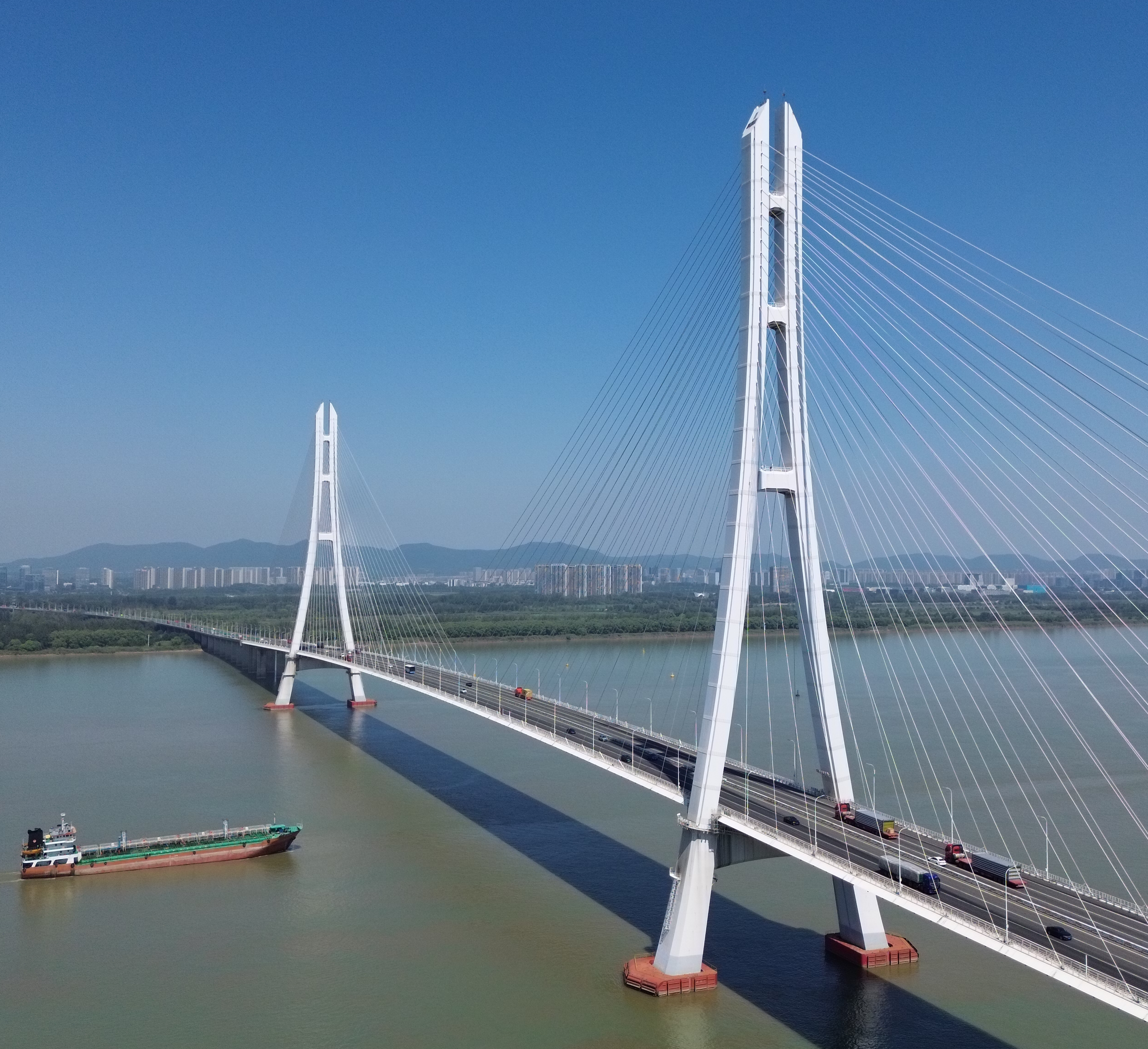
Third Nanjing Yangtze Bridge

In the 1960s, the first Nanjing Yangtze River Bridge was completed, and served as the only bridge crossing over the Lower Yangtze in eastern China at that time. The bridge was a source of pride and an important symbol of modern China, having been built and designed by the Chinese themselves following failed surveys by other nations and the reliance on and then rejection of Soviet expertise. Begun in 1960 and opened to traffic in 1968, the bridge is a two-tiered road and rail design spanning 4,600 metres (15,100 ft) on the upper deck, with approximately 1,580 metres (5,180 ft) spanning the river itself. Since then four more bridges and four tunnels have been built. Going in the downstream direction, the Yangtze crossings in Nanjing are: Dashengguan Bridge, Third Bridge, Fifth Nanjing Yangtze River Bridge, Nanjing Yangtze River Tunnel (南京长江隧道), Line 10 Metro Tunnel, Nanjing Yangtze Tunnel (南京扬子江隧道), First Bridge, Yanziji Yangtze River Tunnel, Nanjing Baguazhou Yangtze River Bridge and Nanjing Qixiashan Yangtze River Bridge.

==== Nanjing Yangtze River Bridges ====
- Nanjing Yangtze River Bridge, also known as First Nanjing Yangtze Bridge (opened 1968, 160 m longest span)
- Nanjing Baguazhou Yangtze River Bridge, also known as Second Nanjing Yangtze River Bridge (opened 1997, 628 m longest span)
- Nanjing Dashengguan Yangtze River Bridge, also known as Third Nanjing Yangtze Bridge (opened 2005, 648 m longest span)
- Nanjing Qixiashan Yangtze River Bridge, also known as Fourth Nanjing Yangtze River Bridge (opened 2012, 1,418m longest span)
- Nanjing Jiangxinzhou Yangtze River Bridge, also known as Fifth Nanjing Yangtze River Bridge (opened 2020, 600 m longest span)
- Nanjing Xianxin Yangtze River Bridge (opened 2023, 1,760 m longest span)

=== Mineral resources ===
Nanjing is rich in mineral resources. The discovered minerals include 49 types of iron, copper, lead, zinc, strontium, ferrosulfide, dolomite, limestone, gypsum, and clay, among which 31 are of proven reserves. Nanjing's minerals are mainly concentrated in 4 metallogenic belts, namely the Jiangpu-Liuhe iron and copper metallogenic belt, Ningzhen iron, copper, and sulfur polymetallic metallogenic belt, Ningwu iron, copper.

== Government ==
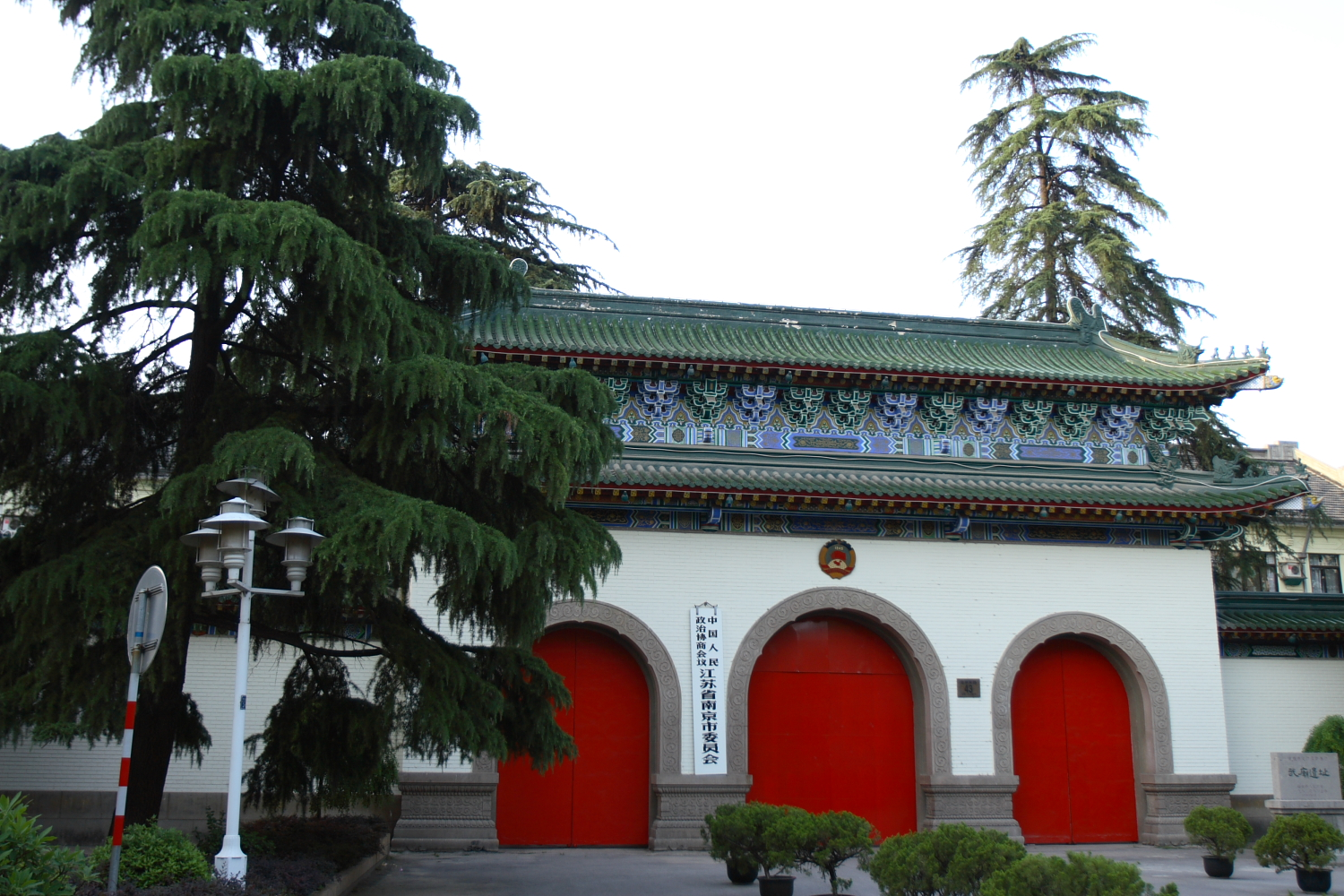
Nanjing Municipal People's Government

At present, the full name of the government of Nanjing is "Nanjing Municipal People's Government" and the municipality is under the one-party rule of the Chinese Communist Party, with the Party Secretary of Nanjing as the de facto governor of the municipality and the mayor as the executive head of the government working under the secretary.

=== Administrative divisions ===
The sub-provincial city of Nanjing is divided into 11 districts.

Map	Subdivision	Chinese	Hanyu Pinyin	Population (2020)	Area (km^{2})	Density (/km^{2})
City Proper
	Xuanwu District	玄武区	Xuánwǔ Qū	537,825	75.21	7,151
	Qinhuai District	秦淮区	Qínhuái Qū	740,809	49.15	15,072
	Jianye District	建邺区	Jiànyè Qū	534,257	80.94	6,601
	Gulou District	鼓楼区	Gǔlóu Qū	940,387	53.87	17,457
	Qixia District	栖霞区	Qīxiá Qū	987,835	390.0	2,533
	Yuhuatai District	雨花台区	Yǔhuātái Qū	608,780	133.2	4,570
Suburban
	Pukou District	浦口区	Pǔkǒu Qū	1,171,603	902.7	1,298
	Jiangning District	江宁区	Jiāngníng Qū	1,926,117	1,564	1,232
	Luhe District	六合区	Lùhé Qū	946,563	1,481	639.1
	Lishui District	溧水区	Lìshuǐ Qū	491,336	1,068	460.1
	Gaochun District	高淳区	Gāochún Qū	429,173	791.8	542.0
	Total			9,314,685	6,590	1,413
Defunct districts: Baixia District and Xiaguan District

== Demographics ==
Population trend

Year	Residents (in million)	natural growth rate (%)
1949	2.5670	13.09
1950	2.5670	15.64
1955	2.8034	19.94
1960	3.2259	0.23
1965	3.4529	25.58
1970	3.6053	20.76
1975	3.9299	9.53
1978	4.1238	8.84
1990	5.0182	9.18

Year	Residents (in million)	natural growth rate (%)
1995	5.2172	2.62
1996	5.2543	2.63
1997	5.2982	2.16
1998	5.3231	1.00
1999	5.3744	2.01
2000	5.4489	2.48
2001	5.5304	1.60
2002	5.6328	0.70
2003	5.7223	1.50
2006	6.0700	6.11

At the time of the 2010 census, the total population of the City of Nanjing was 8.005 million. The OECD estimated the encompassing metropolitan area at the time as 11.7 million. Official statistics in 2011 estimated the city's population to be 8.11 million. The birth rate was 8.86 percent and the death rate was 6.88 percent. The urban area had a population of 6.47 million people. The sex ratio of the city population was 107.31 males to 100 females.

As in most of eastern China, the official ethnic makeup of Nanjing is predominantly Han nationality (98.56 percent), with 50 other official ethnic groups. In 1999, 77,394 residents belonged to officially defined minorities, among which the vast majority (64,832) were Hui, contributing 83.76 percent to the minority population. The second and third largest minority groups were Manchu (2,311) and Zhuang (533). Most of the minority nationalities resided in Jianye District, comprising 9.13 percent of the district's population.

=== Languages ===
Huai Chinese is spoken throughout much of Nanjing, with Nanjingese narrowly defined as being the variety spoken in and around the city centre. There is considerable variation in phonology and lexicon between older and younger speakers, as well as those from the inner city and the outer suburbs. Areas north of the Yangtze and those south of the Yangtze are said to each form a clade. In the former counties of Gaochun and Lishui in southern Nanjing prefecture, Northern Wu and Xuanzhou Wu varieties are spoken.

Speakers of modern Huai varieties first settled in Nanjing and its peripheries during the Southern Song dynasty, replacing Wu Chinese-speaking populations that used to live in the area. As such, many Huai varieties, including those in Nanjing, have considerable similarities with those of Wu Chinese. During the Ming and Qing dynasties, a court language that is widely believed to be a Nanjingese-derived koine was used. Transcriptions of this language can be found up to the mid-nineteenth century, when the court language shifted to that of modern-day Beijing instead.

Standard Mandarin was selected to be based on Beijing Mandarin, then Beiping, rather than that of Nanjing during the Republican rule of the Mainland. This standard was later promoted, resulting in a decrease in the use of Nanjingese. Use of Nanjingese is markedly lower in migrant populations and younger generations. Nanjing locals maintain a generally positive view of Nanjingese due to its covert prestige, whereas migrants or non-local residents tend to view it neutrally or positively, though they also overwhelmingly rely on Standard Mandarin in daily use and believe that there is no clear need to use or even learn Nanjingese. In July 2017, the Ministry of Education and the National Language Commission held a press conference, and the penetration rate of Mandarin has reached 73%.

=== Religion ===
Nanjing has four major religions: Buddhism, Taoism, Christianity, and Islam. Nanjing is one of the earliest areas in China to spread Buddhist culture. The "480 Temples in the Southern Dynasties" has become the center of Chinese Buddhist culture and the ancestral home of the Sanlunzong, Niutouzong, Fayanzong, and other Buddhist sects. Nanjing is also the place for the revival of modern Chinese Buddhist culture. The Jinling Carved Scriptures integrates Buddhist publishing, dissemination, and research. It is still a center of Buddhist scripture cirulation. Ancient famous temples such as Jianchu Temple, Qixia Temple, Waguan Temple, Qingliang Temple, Jiming Temple, Dabaoen Temple, etc. were revived. Nanjing Taoism has a long history and occupies an important position in the history of Chinese Taoism.

The spread of Catholicism in Nanjing began more than 400 years ago and was catalyzed by the scientist and missionary Matteo Ricci, who established a Jesuit residence with the encouragement of local officals. The Shigu Road Catholic Church is the cathedral of the Catholic Diocese of Nanjing. The Nanjing Diocese with Nanjing as its center covers a vast area. As one of the national centers of Christianity in China, Nanjing has two seminaries, Jinling Theological Seminary and Jiangsu Theological Seminary. The Christian social service organization, Amity Foundation and the world's largest Bible printing company, Amity Printing Company are both in Nanjing.

Nanjing is the birthplace of the Islamic "Renaissance" and has an important influence on the development of Chinese Islamic culture.

== Economy ==
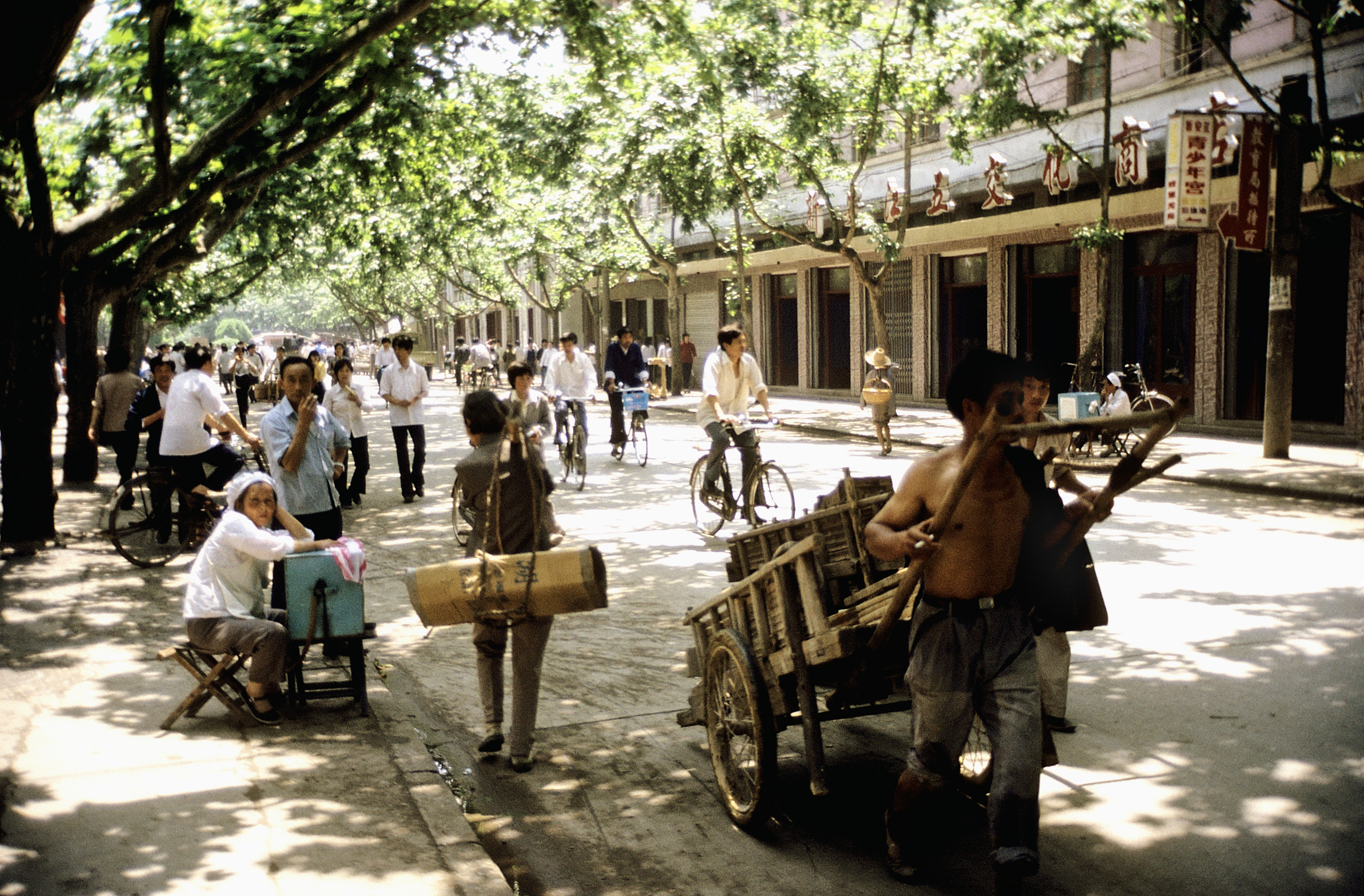
Nanjing city centre in May 1987

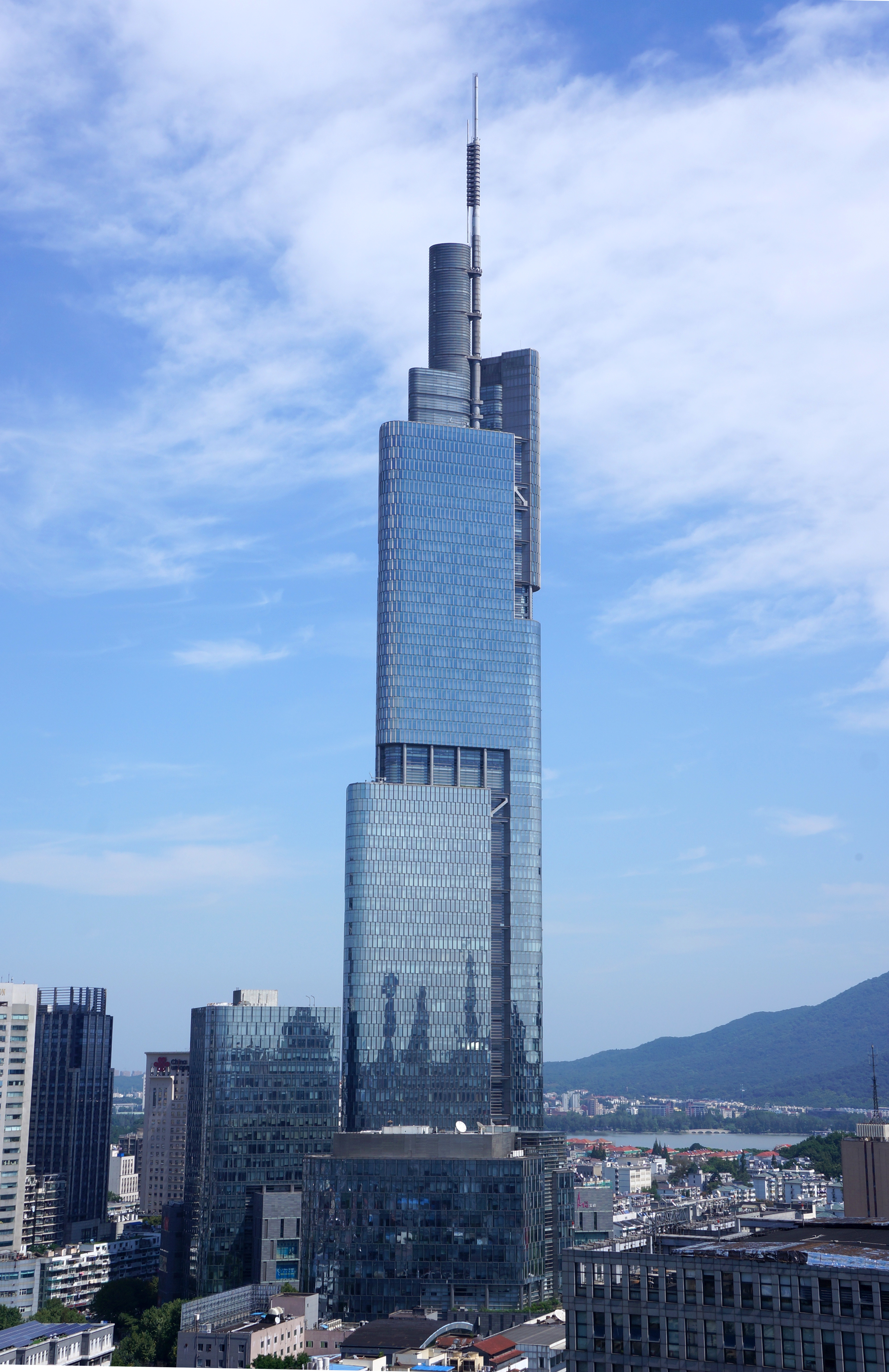
Nanjing Zifeng Tower with the Purple Mountain in the background

As of 2025, Nanjing had a GDP of CN¥1.942 trillion (US$272 billion) and a GDP per capita of CN¥202,900 (US$28,406). The current economy of the city, is dominated by the service industries, accounting for about 60 percent of the GDP of the city, and financial industry, culture industry and tourism industry are the top three. Industries of information technology, energy saving and environmental protection, new energy, smart power grid and intelligent equipment manufacturing have become the pillar of the industries. Big civilian-run enterprise include Suning Commerce, Yurun, Sanpower, Fuzhong, Hiteker, 5stars, Jinpu, Tiandi, CTTQ Pharmaceutical, Nanjing Iron and Steel Company and Simcere Pharmaceutical. Big state-owned firms include Panda Electronics, Yangzi Petrochemical, Jinling Petrochemical, Nanjing Chemical, Jincheng Motors, Jinling Pharmaceutical, Chenguang and NARI. The city has also attracted foreign investments. Multinational firms such as Siemens, Ericsson, Volkswagen, Iveco, A.O. Smith, and Sharp have established their offices, and a number of multinationals such as Ford, IBM, Lucent, Samsung and SAP have established research center here. Many China-based leading firms such as Huawei, ZTE and Lenovo have key R&D institutes in the city. Nanjing is an industrial technology research and development hub, hosting many R&D centers and institutions, especially in areas of electronics technology, information technology, computer software, biotechnology and pharmaceutical technology and new material technology.

In recent years, Nanjing has been developing its economy, commerce, industry, as well as city construction. In 2013 the city's GDP was RMB 801 billion (3rd in Jiangsu), and GDP per capita (current price) was RMB 98,174(US$16041), an 11 percent increase from 2012. The average urban resident's disposable income was RMB 36,200, while the average rural resident's net income was RMB 14,513. The registered urban unemployment rate was 3.02 percent, lower than the national average (4.3 percent). Nanjing's Gross Domestic Product ranked 12th in 2013 in China, and its overall competence ranked 6th in mainland and 8th including Taiwan and Hong Kong in 2009. In 2004, Nanjing ranked sixth in China's Economic Center Positioning Index, after Beijing, Shanghai, Guangzhou, Shenzhen, and Tianjin. In 2008, the Headquarters Economy Development Capacity ranked the city fifth in China, behind Beijing, Shanghai, Guangzhou, and Shenzhen. In 2014 China's regional central cities (excluding Beijing and Shanghai) competitiveness evaluation, Nanjing was second only to Shenzhen and Guangzhou. In 2015, Nanjing ranked fifth in China's investment attractive cities, closely following Beijing, Shanghai, Guangzhou, and Shenzhen. In August 2020, Nanjing ranked among China's top ten GDP in the first half of the year. In 2019, Nanjing's GDP was 1403,015 billion yuan, ranking 11th in the country, an increase of 7.8% over the previous year. The per capita GDP is 152,886 yuan, ranking second in China's municipalities, sub-provincial cities and provincial capitals, second only to Shenzhen, and the provincial capital ranking first. In 2021, Nanjing's GDP reached 1,6355.32 billion yuan.

=== Primary industry ===
Nanjing is one of China's important agricultural and commercial grain bases. The main cash crops are rice, cotton, silkworm cocoons, hemp, tea, bamboo, fruits, medicinal materials, etc. Due to the fertile water quality on both sides of the Yangtze River, it is also one of China's important freshwater fishery bases.

In 2019, the total output value of Nanjing's agriculture, forestry, animal husbandry, and fishery was 47.250 billion yuan, an increase of 4.8% over the previous year. Among them, the agricultural output value was 24.077 billion yuan, the forestry output value was 2.017 billion yuan, the animal husbandry output value was 2.435 billion yuan, the fishery output value was 15.389 billion yuan, and the agricultural, forestry, animal husbandry and fishery service industry output value was 3.333 billion yuan.

=== Secondary industry ===
In 2019, Nanjing's total industrial added value was 421.577 billion yuan, an increase of 6.9%. The added value of industrial enterprises above the designated size was 309.226 billion yuan, an increase of 7.0%. Among the industries above designated size, the added value of state-owned and state-holding enterprises fell by 0.2%, private enterprises increased by 20.3%, and foreign companies, Hong Kong, Macao, and Taiwan enterprises increased by 7.0%. Large and medium-sized enterprises increased by 3.9%, and small and micro enterprises increased by 18.2%. Among the 37 major industries in the system, 22 industries have achieved growth in added value. Among the top ten industries ranked by cumulative value-added are electronics, electrical machinery, steel, medicine, general equipment, and non-metal products, with electronics increasing by 20.2%.

=== Tertiary industry ===
Nanjing is an important regional financial and business center positioned by the National Development and Reform Commission. The financial industry is an important strategic pillar industry in Nanjing. The total financial volume and financial resources account for 25% of Jiangsu Province. In the 2018 China Financial Center Index evaluation, Nanjing's financial industry performance ranked fourth in China, after Beijing, Shanghai, and Shenzhen. In 2018, Nanjing's financial industry achieved an added value of 147.332 billion yuan, and the balance of domestic and foreign currency deposits in financial institutions was 3,452.486 billion yuan.

Nanjing is China's service outsourcing base and national software export innovation base. It is China's only pilot city for comprehensive reform of the national science and technology system. The software industry is the number one leading industry and pillar industry that Nanjing strives to cultivate. At the end of 2019, Nanjing achieved a total execution value of 17.33 billion US dollars in service outsourcing, ranking first among Chinese cities. In 2018, the software and information service industry had a revenue of 450 billion yuan, ranking fourth in China and first in Jiangsu; following Beijing, Shenzhen, and Shanghai, it accounted for 50.8% of the province's total revenue. There are 12 unicorn companies in Nanjing in 2019, ranking seventh in global cities and fifth in China.

The convention and exhibition industry is an important industry in Nanjing. In the World 2013 City Conference Industry Development Ranking issued by the International Conference and Convention Association (ICCA), Nanjing has become the city with the most international conferences in China after Beijing and Shanghai. In 2019, Beichen Convention and Exhibition Research Institute released the "China Exhibition Index Report 2019", and Nanjing ranked seventh in China in the comprehensive index of domestic urban exhibition industry development. According to the 2017 China Exhibition Statistics Report released in 2018, Nanjing ranked fifth in the exhibition area in all cities in China.

== Suburbanization ==
Starting in the 1990s, Nanjing experienced rapid urban expansion, with areas outside the city center gradually becoming suburbanized. Following the reform and opening up, rapid population growth and housing policy reforms strongly promoted the development of residential and commercial areas surrounding Nanjing. Simultaneously, newly developed suburbs absorbed an increasing number of urban residents, reducing population density in the city center and reshaping land use and population distribution. The suburbanization of Nanjing's surrounding areas also reflects the urban development trends of many major Chinese cities after the reforms.

=== University Town Development ===
The booming development of university towns played a significant role in the suburbanization of Nanjing's surrounding areas. The concentration of universities in the suburbs facilitated the expansion of educational infrastructure and improved the educational level of schools outside the city center. University towns also promoted the development of nearby residential areas, commercial service areas, and public transportation networks. For example, Xianlin University Town, located in the northeast part of Nanjing, boasts numerous higher education institutions and research facilities, along with diverse commercial services and convenient transportation.

=== New Urban Zones ===
Besides university towns, several newly planned urban areas, such as Hexi New Town and Jiangning, have also become major residential and commercial centers in Nanjing. These new urban areas, supported by government planning and policies, have developed rapidly, attracting investment in real estate, public facilities, and commercial services, and have grown rapidly. These new urban areas have promoted the decentralization of economic activities, enabling the economy of the entire city of Nanjing to develop and progress together.

== Transport ==
Nanjing is the transport hub in eastern China and the downstream Yangtze River area. Different means of transport constitute a three-dimensional transport system that includes land, water and air. As in most other Chinese cities, public transport is the dominant mode of travel for the majority of citizens. As of October 2014, Nanjing had four bridges and two tunnels over the Yangtze River, linking districts north of the river with the city center on the south bank.

=== Rail ===
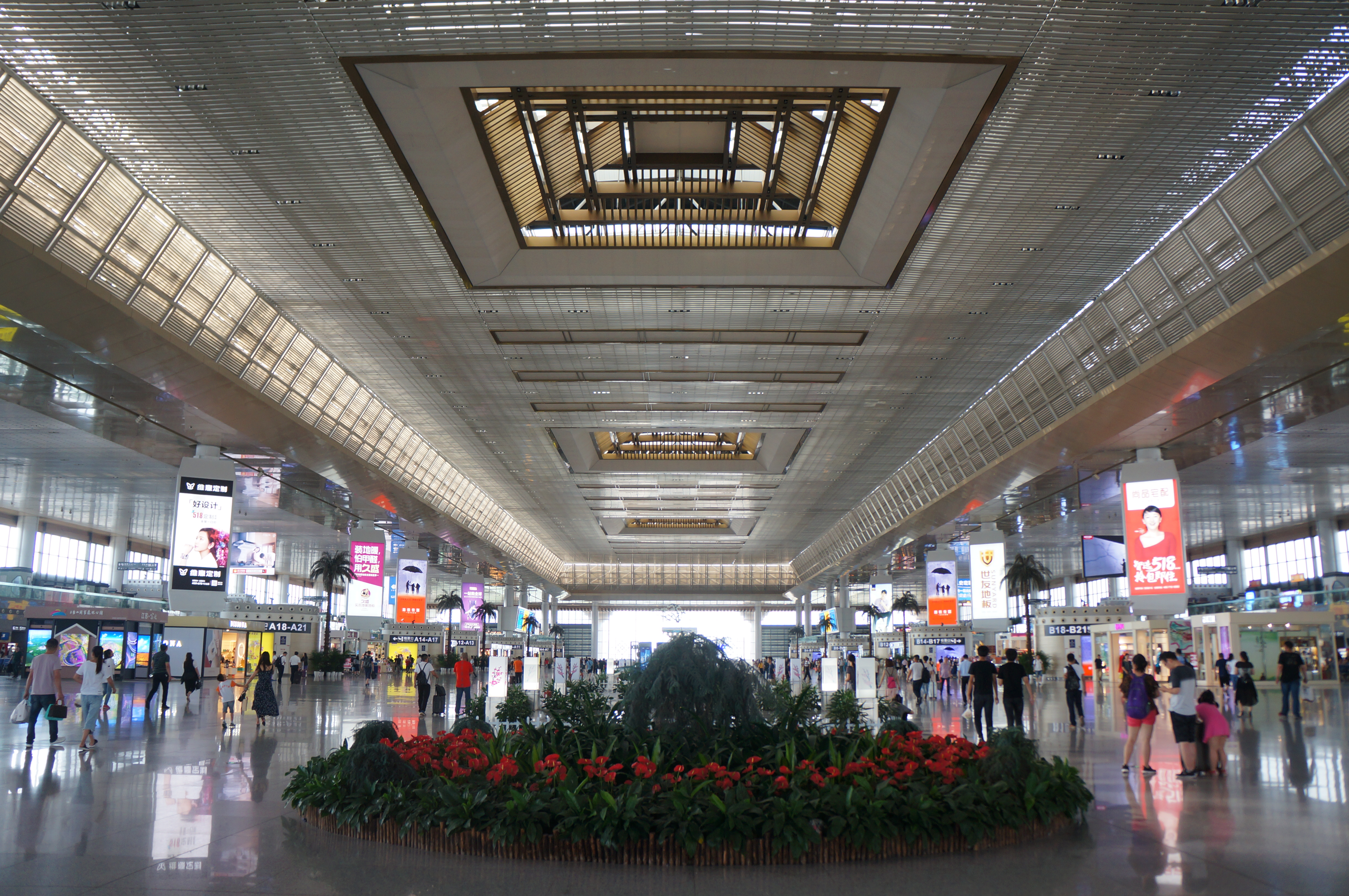
Nanjing South Railway Station

Nanjing is an important railway hub in eastern China. It serves as rail junction for the Beijing-Shanghai (Jinghu) (which is itself composed of the old Jinpu and Huning Railways), Nanjing–Tongling Railway (Ningtong), Nanjing–Qidong (Ningqi), and the Nanjing-Xi'an (Ningxi) which encompasses the Hefei–Nanjing Railway. Nanjing is connected to the national high-speed railway network by Beijing–Shanghai High-Speed Railway and Shanghai–Wuhan–Chengdu Passenger Dedicated Line, with several more high-speed rail lines under construction. The main stations in Nanjing are Nanjing Station, Nanjing South Station, Jiangning Station, Lishui Station, Xianlin Station, Jiangning West Station, Nanjing East Station, Nanjing Passenger and Technical Station, as well as the new Nanjing North Station and Lukou Air-Rail Intermodal Transport Hub Station planning in. Among them, Nanjing Railway Station is the national railway hub station and China's top ten railway hubs, Nanjing South Railway Station is the national railway hub station and Asia's largest high-speed railway station, and Nanjing East Railway Station is the largest marshalling station in East China and the country's 15th largest railway network marshalling station. Nanjing Passenger Technology Station is a train technology station

Among all 17 railway stations in Nanjing, passenger rail service is mainly provided by Nanjing Railway Station and Nanjing South Railway Station, while other stations like Nanjing West Railway Station, Zhonghuamen Railway Station and Xianlin Railway Station serve minor roles. Nanjing Railway Station was first built in 1968. On November 12, 1999, the station was burnt in a serious fire. Reconstruction of the station was finished on September 1, 2005. Nanjing South Railway Station, which is one of the five hub stations on Beijing–Shanghai High-Speed Railway, has officially been claimed as the largest railway station in Asia and the second largest in the world in terms of GFA (Gross Floor Area). Construction of Nanjing South Station began on January 10, 2008. The station was opened for public service in 2011.

=== Aviation ===
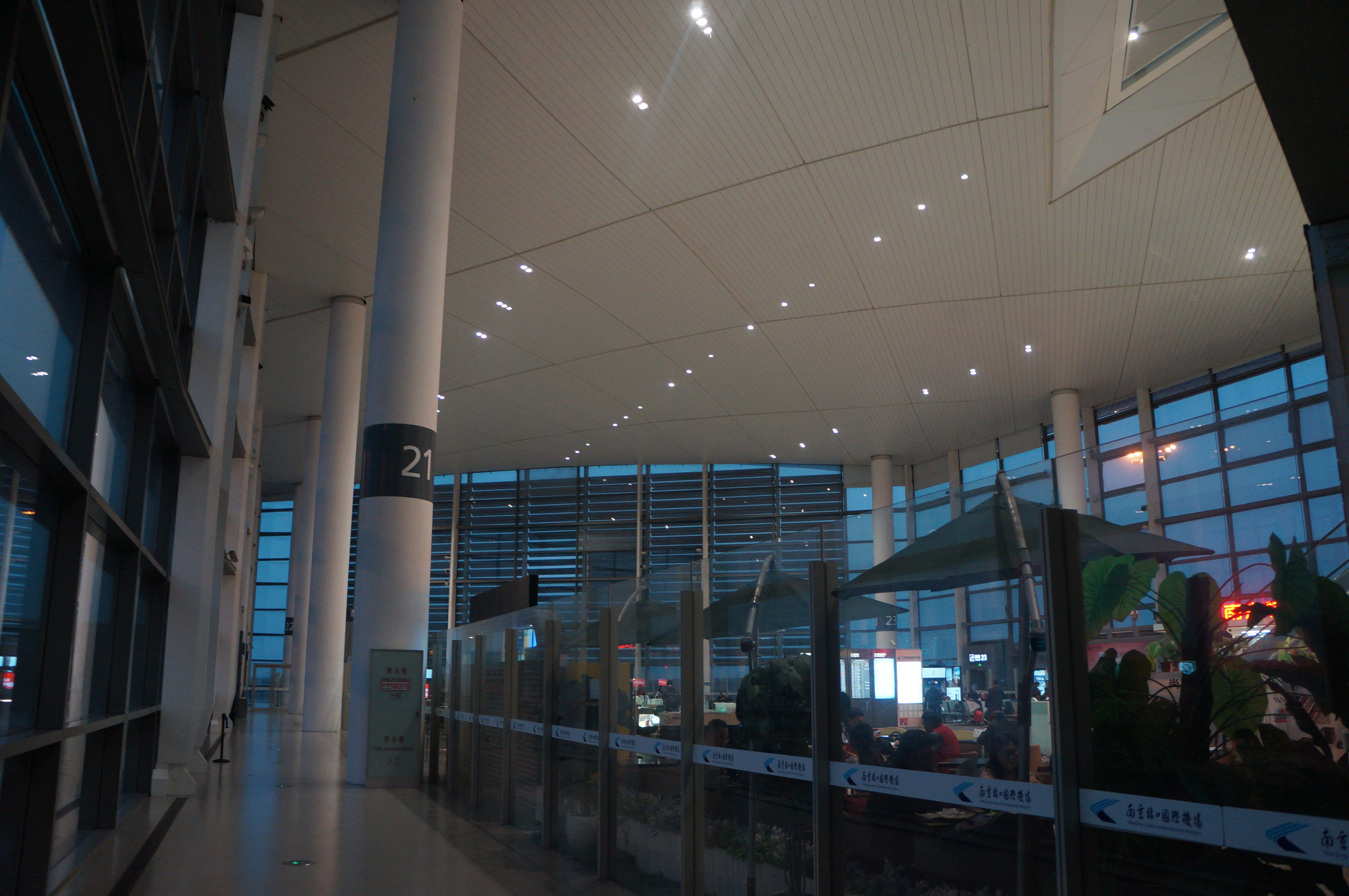
Nanjing Lukou International Airport, NKG

Nanjing's airport, Lukou International Airport (NKG), serves both national and international destinations. In 2013, Nanjing airport handled 15,011,792 passengers and 255,788.6 tonnes of freight. The airport currently has 85 routes to national and international destinations, which include Japan, Korea, Thailand, Malaysia, Singapore, United States and Germany. The airport is connected by a 29 km (18 mi) highway directly to the city center, and is also linked to various intercity highways, making it accessible to the passengers from the surrounding cities. A railway Ninggao Intercity Line has been built to link the airport with Nanjing South Railway Station. Lukou Airport was opened on June 28, 1997, replacing Nanjing Dajiaochang Airport as the main airport serving Nanjing. Dajiaochang Airport is still used as a military air base. Nanjing has another airport – Nanjing Ma'an International Airport which temporarily serves as a dual-use military and civil airport.

=== Shipping ===
Nanjing Port sits on the Yangtze River in Nanjing, Jiangsu, China, and ranks as one of the river's major ports. It handles a wide mix of cargo and ties together river, sea, road and rail transport, forming part of the broader Yangtze shipping network that connects inland areas to coastal and international routes. In 2018, the extension of the river's 12.5-metre deep-water channel to Nanjing opened the port to larger vessels for the first time. Since then, the port has also built up its container rail-water transport, helping move goods between the Yangtze region and the rest of China.

=== Road ===
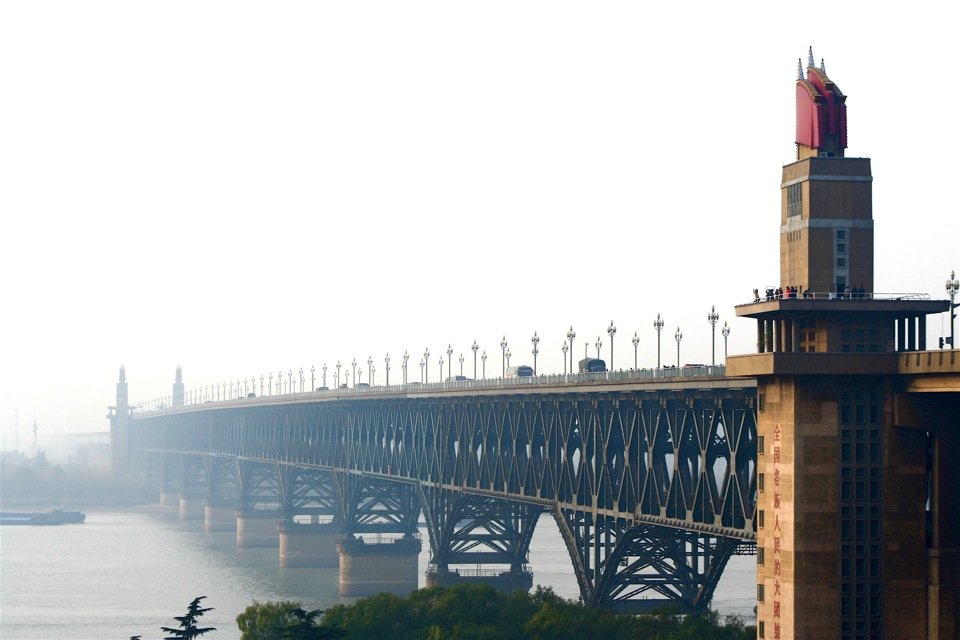
Nanjing Yangtze River Bridge, built in 1968, the first bridge over the Yangtze River to be built without foreign assistance.

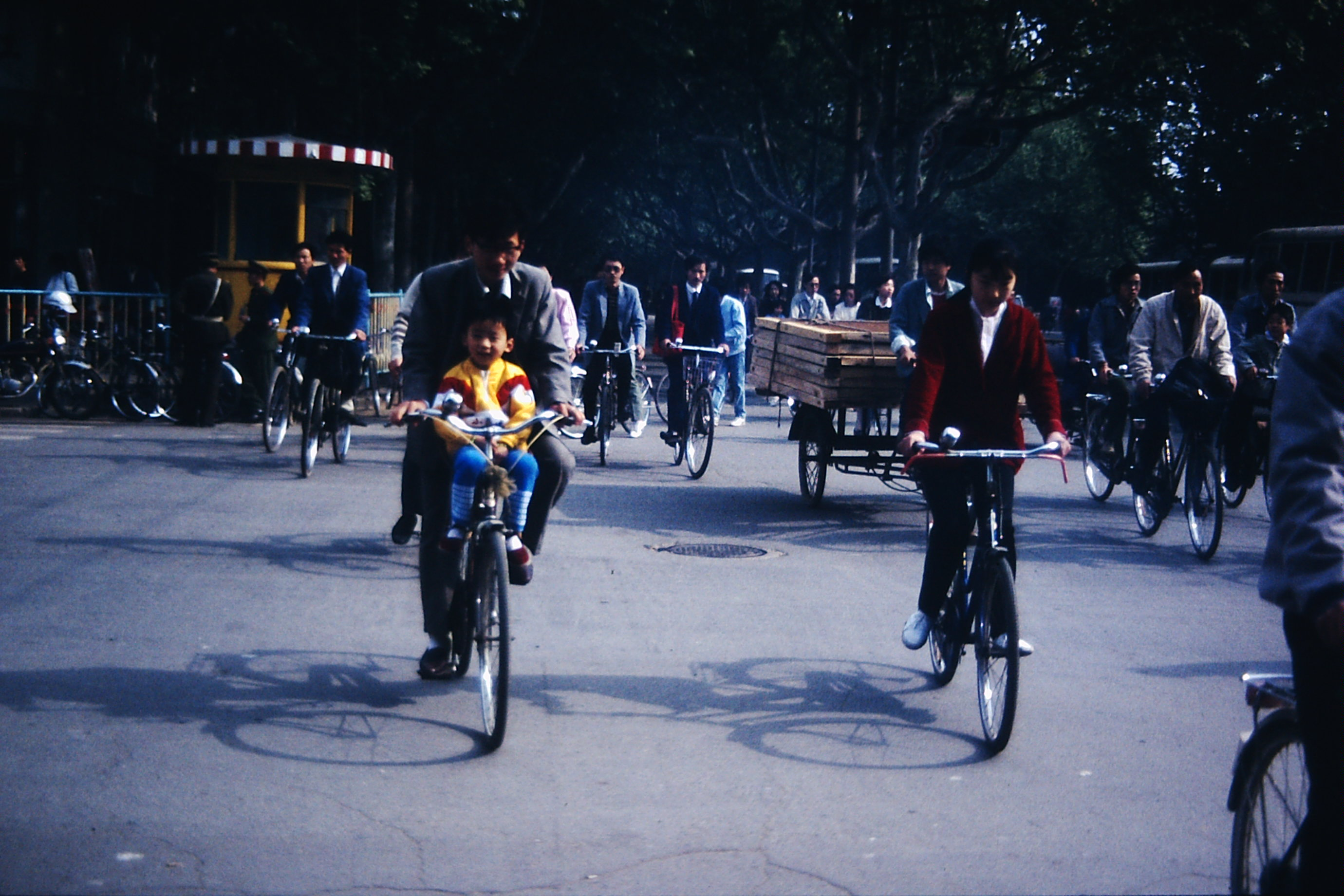
Nanjing traffic in city center, 1989

As an important regional hub in the Yangtze River Delta, Nanjing is well-connected by over 60 state and provincial highways to all parts of China.

Highways such as Hu–Ning, Ning–He, Ning–Hang enable commuters to travel to Shanghai, Hefei, Hangzhou, and other important cities quickly and conveniently. Inside the city of Nanjing, there are 230 km (140 mi) of highways, with a highway coverage density of 3.38 kilometers per hundred square kilometers (5.44 mi/100 sq mi). The total road coverage density of the city is 112.56 kilometers per hundred square kilometers (181.15 mi/100 sq mi). The two artery roads in Nanjing are Zhongshan Road and Hanzhong Road are also the two main roads which cross each other in the city center, Xinjiekou.

Expressways {G+XXxx (National Express, 国家高速), S+XX (省级高速)}:

- G25 Changchun–Shenzhen Expressway
- G36 Nanjing–Luoyang Expressway
- G40 Shanghai–Xi'an Expressway
- G42 Shanghai–Chengdu Expressway
- G4211 Nanjing–Wuhu Expressway, a spur of G42 that extends west to Wuhu, Anhui
- S55 Nanjing–Gaochun(Xuancheng) Expressway (宁宣高速或南京机场高速)
- S38 Yanjiang Expressway (沿江高速或常合高速)
- G2503 Nanjing Ring Expressway (新南京绕城高速或南京绕越高速)
- S001 Nanjing Ring Highway (旧南京绕城高速或南京绕城公路)

National Highway

Nanjing is a national comprehensive transportation hub, and its highway network density ranks among the top central cities in the country. As of 2019, the total mileage of Nanjing highways opened to traffic has reached 630 kilometers, and the highway network density has reached 9.56 kilometers per 100 square kilometers, ranking first in the country. With Nanjing as the center, Ninghu, Ninggao, Ningzhen, Ningyang, Ningchu, Ninglian, Ningtong, Ningchao, Ninghe, Ningluo, Ningma, Ningxuan, Ningyan, Ninghuai, Ningmu, Ningchang, Ninghang and other high-grade highways lead to Jiang surrounding provinces and cities in a radial pattern.

Main long-distance bus terminals: Nanjing Bus Station, Nanjing South Bus Station, Nanjing North Bus Station, Nanjing East Bus Station, Jiangning Bus Station, Lishui Bus Station, Gaochun Bus Station, Nanjing Getang Bus Station.

{G1xx (which starts from Beijing), G2xx (north-south), G3xx (west-east)}:

- China National Highway 104—motorists can either drive northwest to Beijing or south to Fuzhou, Fujian.
- China National Highway 205—motorists can either drive north to Shanhaiguan, Hebei or south to Shenzhen, Guangdong.
- China National Highway 312—motorists can either drive east to Shanghai or west to Khorgas, Xinjiang on the Kazakh border
- China National Highway 328—Nanjing is the western terminus of G328, which motorists can follow to Hai'an County in eastern Jiangsu

=== Public transport ===
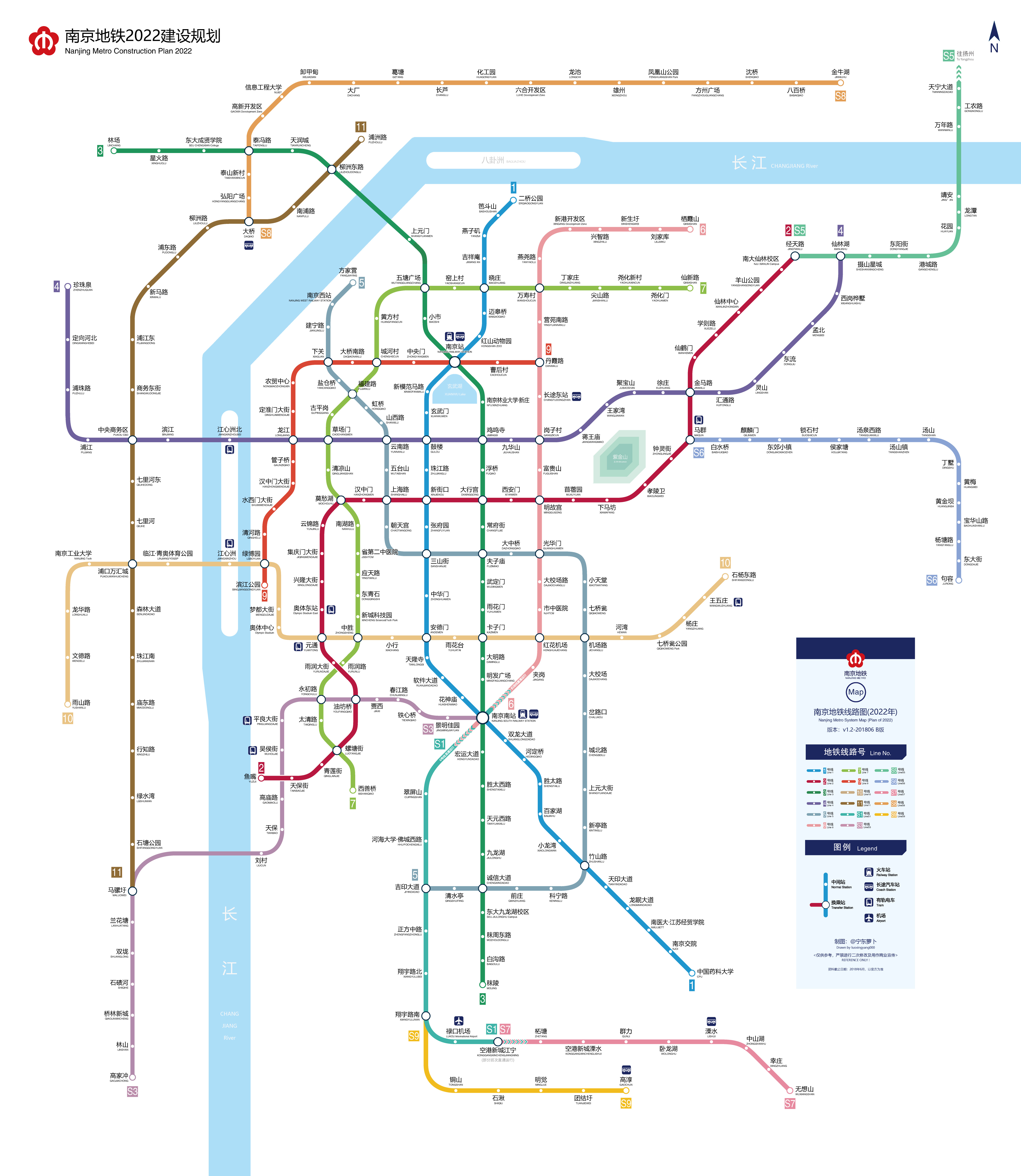
Nanjing Metro Construction Plan by 2022

The city has an efficient public transport network, which mainly consists of bus, taxi and metro systems. The bus network, which is currently run by three companies since 2011, provides more than 370 routes covering all parts of the city and suburban areas. At present, the Nanjing Metro system has a grand total of 449 km (279 mi) of route and 208 stations across 12 lines. They are Line 1, Line 2, Line 3, Line 4, Line 7, Line 10, Line S1, Line S3, Line S6, Line S7, Line S8 and Line S9. The city is planning to complete a 17-line Metro and light-rail system by 2030. The expansion of the Metro network will greatly facilitate intracity transport and reduce the currently heavy traffic congestion.

Nanjing's first subway officially opened on September 3, 2005. It is the sixth city in mainland China to open a subway. As of 2019, Nanjing subway has 12 lines and 208 stations, with a total length of 449 kilometers and an average daily passenger flow. With more than 3.4 million passengers, the length of subway lines ranks seventh in China and eighth in the world.

As of the end of 2018, Nanjing had 6,909 buses, operating 468 bus lines, with a total length of 7,670.9 km (4,766.5 mi), an average daily mileage of 1,178×10^{6} km (732×10^{6} mi), and an average daily passenger volume of 2,182 million. At present, Nanjing has eliminated buses below the National III standard and non-air-conditioned buses, and the number of pure electric buses ranks second in the world.

As of the end of 2019, there were more than 12,000 real-name certified taxis in Nanjing. The appearance of the taxis was mostly uniform yellow and black, and the royal blue luxury taxis were a minority.

As of July 2019, there are six online ride-hailing platforms in Nanjing, namely Meituan Taxi, Didi Chuxing, First Taxi-hailing, Cao Cao Special Car, Shenzhou Special Car, T3 Travel, and the current car qualification rate of each platform is 70% the above. At present, there are about 13,000 online car-hailing vehicles legally applying for "car permits" in Nanjing.

As of 2019, there are two lines of Nanjing trams. Nanjing Hexi Tram was officially put into operation on August 1, 2014. It is the world's first inter-area contactless tram, and China's first tram to be charged at a station. The line is about 7.76 kilometers long and has 13 stations., Including 4 subway transfer stations. The Nanjing Kylin Tram was officially put into operation on October 31, 2017. The line is about 8.95 kilometers long and has 15 stations, including 1 subway transfer station.

== Culture and art ==
Jiangnan Examination Hall

Being one of the four ancient capitals of China, Nanjing has always been a cultural center attracting intellectuals from all over the country. In the Tang and Song dynasties, Nanjing was a place where poets gathered and composed poems reminiscent of its luxurious past; during the Ming and Qing dynasties, the city was the official imperial examination center (Jiangnan Examination Hall) for the Jiangnan region, again acting as a hub where different thoughts and opinions converged and thrived.

Nanjing has a long cultural history, with the local education institutions contributing to city's cultural activities.

=== Art ===
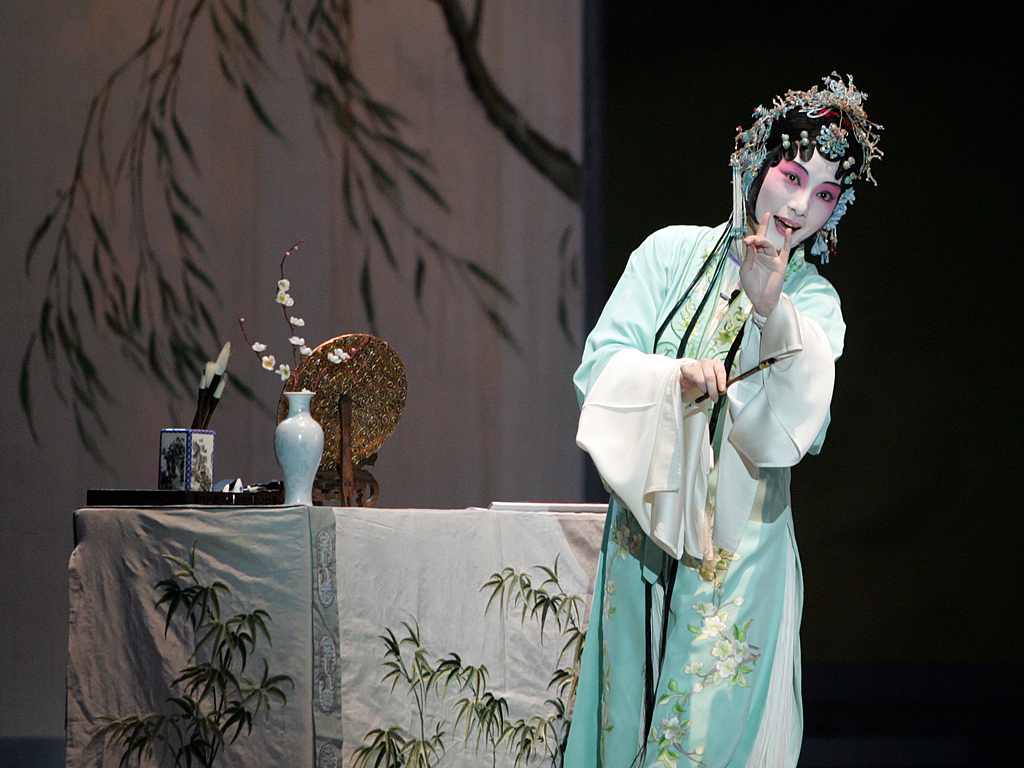
Kunqu

Some of the leading art groups of China are based in Nanjing; they include the Qianxian Dance Company, Nanjing Dance Company, Nanjing Little Red Flower Art Troupe, Jiangsu Peking Opera Institute and Nanjing Xiaohonghua Art Company among others.

Jiangsu Art Gallery is the largest gallery in Jiangsu Province, presenting some of the best traditional and contemporary art pieces of China like the historical Master Ho-Kan; many other smaller-scale galleries, such as Red Chamber Art Garden and Jinling Stone Gallery, also have their own special exhibitions. As of 2019, Nanjing has 14 cultural centers, 100 cultural stations, 15 public libraries (excluding libraries for education systems and enterprises and institutions), 132 movie theaters, and 2 large-scale convention and exhibition centers. They are Nanjing International Exhibition Center and Nanjing International Expo Center, 87 various museums, including 77 state-owned museums and 10 non-state-owned museums. As of the end of August 2020, there are 137 calligraphy and painting academies, art museums, and art galleries in Nanjing.

Nanjing is an important town of Chinese painting and calligraphy. In the Six Dynasties, there were painting and calligraphy masters such as Wang Xizhi, Wang Xianzhi, Zhang Sengyou, Lu Tanwei, and Gu Kaizhi. The earliest extant painting theory work "Paintings" has a profound impact on later generations. The Nantang Art Academy brought together outstanding calligraphy and painting masters at a time. Dongyuan and Juran pioneered the Southern School of Landscape and became a generation of masters. Xu Xi's flower and bird paintings, Zhou Wenju, and Gu Hongzhong's figure paintings continue to pass. "Han Xizai's Night Banquet" is a masterpiece of ancient Chinese meticulous brushwork. The system of Nantang Painting Academy was also inherited by later generations. The Painting Book of Ten Bamboo Studios in the Ming dynasty reproduced the paintings with the pinnacle of three-dimensional color printing techniques. The Painting Book of Mustard Seed Garden in the early Qing dynasty was regarded as a must-read for learning Chinese painting. The "Eight Masters of Nanjing" headed by Gong Xian were active in Nanjing in the early Qing dynasty and created the Jinling School of Painting. In the 1930s, celebrities in painting circles such as Lv Fengzi, Xu Beihong, Zhang Daqian, Yan Wenliang, Lu Sibai, Chen Zhifo, Gao Jianfu, Pan Yuliang, and Pang Xunqin gathered in Nanjing. Among them, Xu Beihong, Zhang Shuqi, and Liu Zigu were hailed as the "Three Masters of Jinling". Contemporary "New Jinling Painting School" represented by Fu Baoshi, Qian Songyan, Song Wenzhi, Wei Zixi, Yaming,

=== Festivals ===
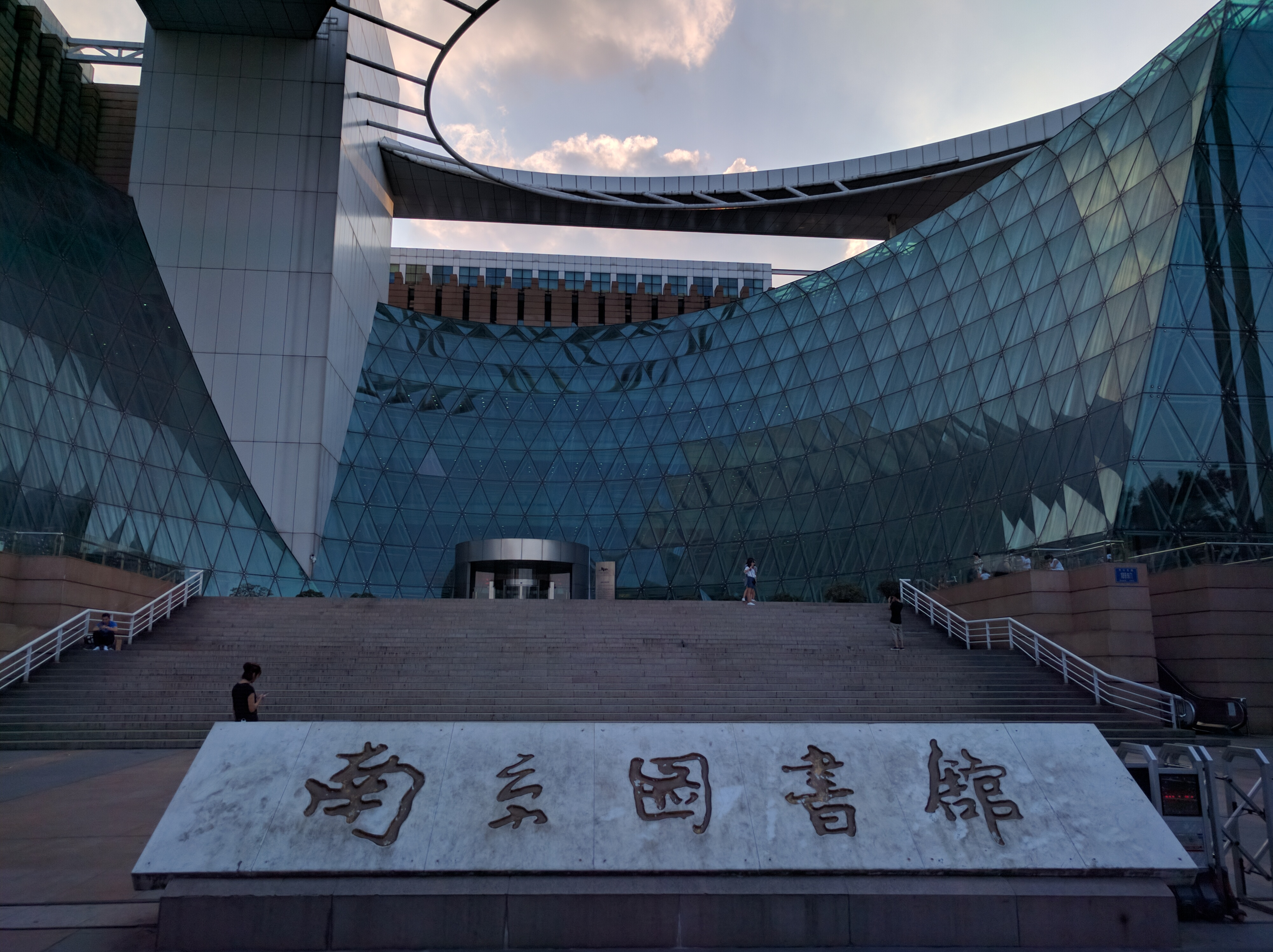
Nanjing Library

Many traditional festivals and customs were observed in the old times, which included climbing the City Wall on January 16, bathing in Qing Xi on March 3, hill hiking on September 9 and others (the dates are in Chinese lunar calendar). Almost none of them, however, are still celebrated by modern Nanjingese.

Instead, Nanjing, as a tourist destination, hosts a series of government-organized events throughout the year. The annual International Plum Blossom Festival held in Plum Blossom Hill, the largest plum collection in China, attracts thousands of tourists both domestically and internationally. Other events include Nanjing Baima Peach Blossom and Kite Festival, Jiangxin Zhou Fruit Festival and Linggu Temple Sweet Osmanthus Festival.

=== Libraries ===
Nanjing Library, founded in 1907, houses more than 10 million volumes of printed materials and is the third largest library in China, after the National Library in Beijing and Shanghai Library. Other libraries, such as city-owned Jinling Library and various district libraries, also provide considerable amount of information to citizens. Nanjing University Library is the second largest university libraries in China after Peking University Library, and the fifth largest nationwide, especially in the number of precious collections.

=== Museums ===
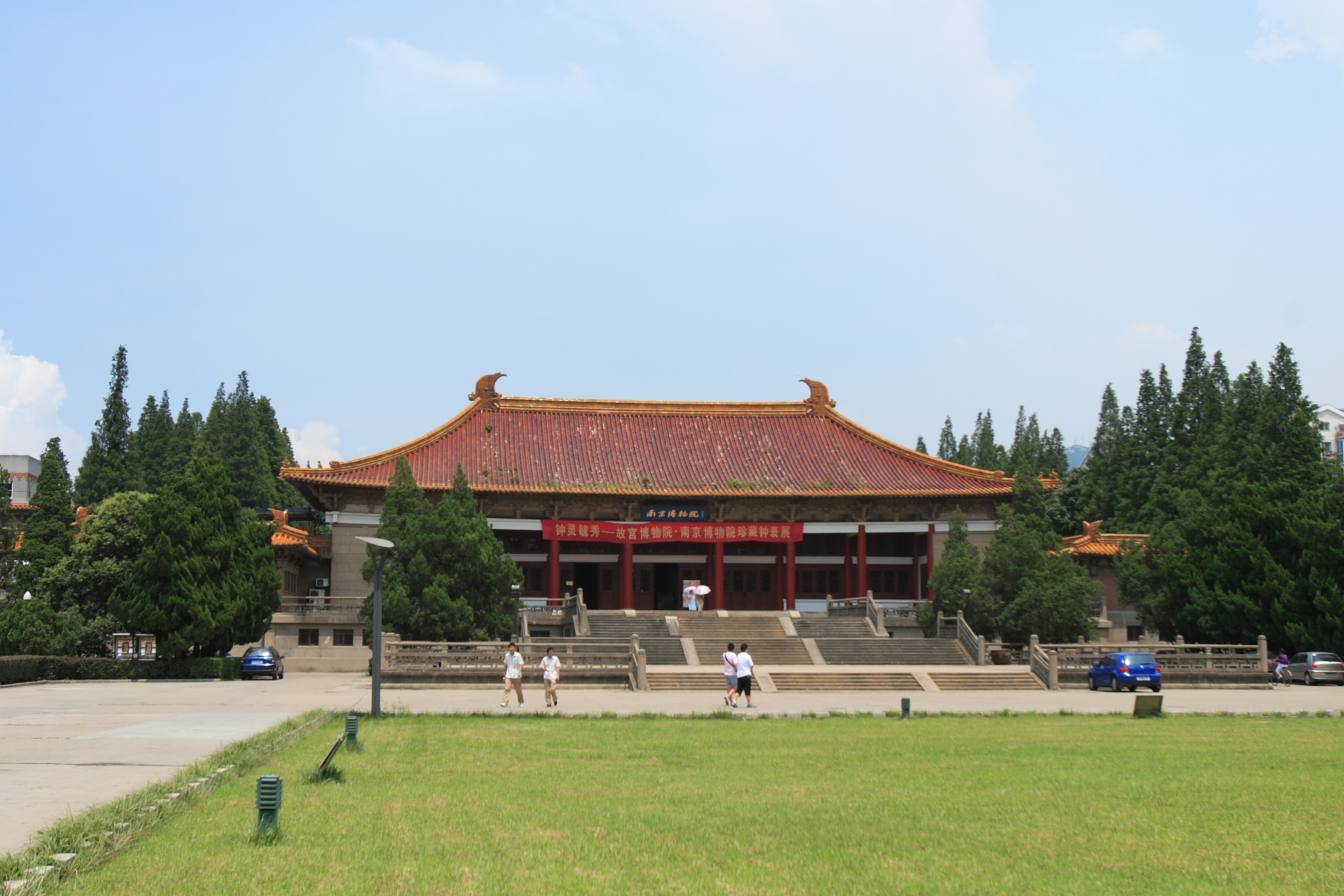
Nanjing Museum

Nanjing has some of the oldest and finest museums in China. Nanjing Museum, formerly known as National Central Museum during ROC period, is the first modern museum and remains as one of the leading museums in China having 400,000 items in its permanent collection. The museum is notable for enormous collections of Ming and Qing imperial porcelain, which is among the largest in the world. Other museums include the City Museum of Nanjing in the Chaotian Palace, the Oriental Metropolitan Museum, (Note: Liuchao Gudu Bowuguan (六朝古都博物館)) the China Modern History Museum in the Presidential Palace, the Nanjing Massacre Memorial Hall, the Taiping Kingdom History Museum, Jiangning Imperial Silk Manufacturing Museum, (Note: Jiangning Zhizao Bowuguan (江甯織造博物館)) Nanjing Yunjin Museum, Nanjing City Wall Cultural Museum, Nanjing Customs Museum in Ganxi House, (Note: Nanjing Minsu Bowuguan (南京民俗博物館), located in Ganxi House (甘熙宅第) which is said to be the largest Chinese private house, with the nickname Ninety Nine and a Half Rooms.) Nanjing Astronomical History Museum, Nanjing Paleontological Museum, Nanjing Geological Museum, Nanjing Riverstones Museum, and other museums and memorials such Zheng He Memorial (Note: A small museum and tomb honoring the 15th century seafaring admiral Zheng He although his body was buried at sea off the Malabar Coast near Calicut in western India.) Jinling Four Modern Calligraphers Memorial. (Note: Jinling Shufa Silao Jinianguan (金陵書法四老紀念館, 胡小石、林散之、蕭嫻、高二適))

=== Theater ===
Jiangsu Province Kun Opera is one of the best theaters for Kunqu, China's oldest stage art. It is considered a conservative and traditional troupe. Nanjing also has professional opera troupes for the Yang, Yue (shaoxing), Xi and Jing (Chinese opera varieties) as well as Suzhou pingtan, spoken theater and puppet theater.

Most of Nanjing's major theaters are multi-purpose, used as convention halls, cinemas, musical halls and theaters on different occasions. The major theaters include the People's Convention Hall and the Nanjing Arts and Culture Center. The Capital Theater well known in the past is now a museum in theater/film.

Xiqu is a traditional Chinese drama. After a long period of development and evolution, it has gradually formed the Chinese Opera Garden with the five major Chinese opera types of "Peking Opera, Yue Opera, Huangmei Opera, Ping Opera, and Henan Opera" as the core. Peking opera has a long history in Nanjing: the famous Peking opera master Mei Baojiu has a deep connection with Nanjing. As the honorary president of the "Nanjing Meilanfang Jingkun Art Research Association", Master Mei Jiubao made a special trip to Nanjing as the "Research Association" "Unveiled, and led his disciples to perform the Meipai famous play" The Return of the Phoenix " Zheng Ziru, the famous Peking opera artist, performed "The Flower Spear" in Nanjing.

Kunqu Opera is one of the oldest operas in traditional Chinese opera, and it is also a treasure of traditional Chinese culture and art, especially opera art. It is called an "orchid" in the Hundred Gardens. In Nanjing, famous professional Kunban classes such as "Xinghua Ministry", "Hualin Ministry", "Li Yujia Ban", and "Cao Yinjia Ban" appeared in Nanjing, and the style of singing songs by the voiceless section and literati also continued.

Drama is a form of Western drama introduced in the 20th century. In recent years, Nanjing's annual drama box office has continued to rise. The drama "Mrs of the Sea" staged in Nanjing in 2017, "Broken Gold", "Treasure Island Village" in 2018, and "Hamlet" in 2019 have the highest box office in the country. All fell in Nanjing. Not only that, the box office and attendance rate of some plays such as "White Deer Plain" in Nanjing are also far ahead in the Yangtze River Delta region.

Quyi is the collective name of the various "rap art" of the Chinese nation. It is a unique art form formed by the long-term development and evolution of folk oral literature and singing art. The local folk arts in Nanjing include Southern Crosstalk, Nanjing Baiju, Nanjing Vernacular, Nanjing Pinghua, Gaochun Yangqiang Mulian Opera, Liuhe Hongshan Opera, etc.

=== Night life ===
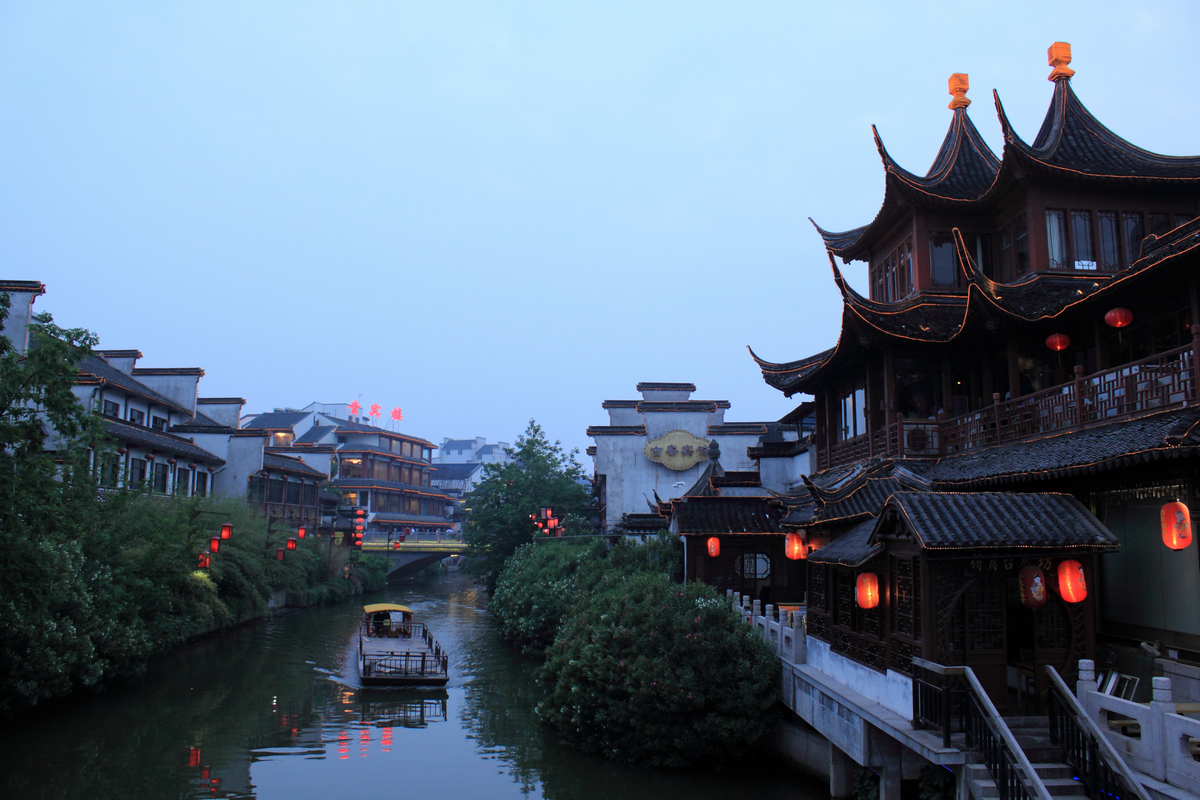
Qinhuai River

Traditionally Nanjing's nightlife was mostly centered around Nanjing Fuzimiao (Confucius Temple) area along the Qinhuai River, where night markets, restaurants and pubs thrived. Boating at night in the river was a main attraction of the city. Thus, one can see the statues of the famous teachers and educators of the past not too far from those of the courtesans who educated the young men in the other arts.

In the past 20 years, several commercial streets have been developed, hence the nightlife has become more diverse: there are shopping malls opening late in the Xinjiekou CBD, as well as in and around major residential areas throughout the city. The well-established "Nanjing 1912" district hosts a wide variety of recreational facilities ranging from traditional restaurants and western pubs to dance clubs, in both its downtown location and beside Baijia Lake in Jiangning District. In recent years, many night-life options have opened up in Catherine Park as well as in shopping malls such as IST in Xinjiekou and Kingmo near Baijai Lake metro station. Other, more student-oriented places are to be found near to Nanjing University and Nanjing Normal University.

=== Food ===
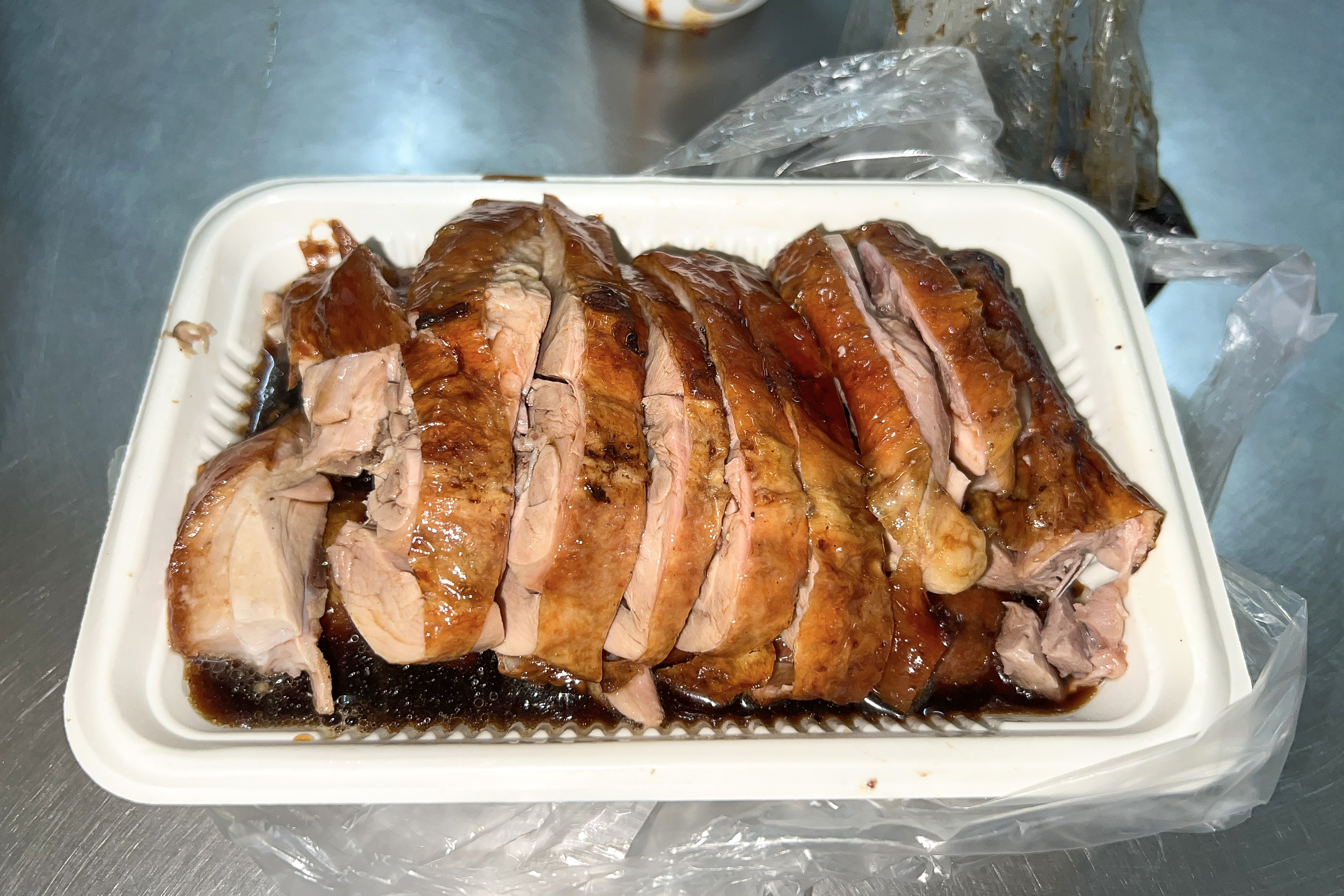
The roast duck, poured with sauce before serving, is one of the local duck dishes of Nanjing

The local cuisine in Nanjing is called Jinling cuisine (金陵菜). It is one important part of Jiangsu cuisine (江苏菜). Jinling cuisine is famous for its meticulous process, emphasizing no added preservatives and its seasonality. Its duck and goose dishes are well known among Chinese for centuries. It also employs many different style of cooking methods, such as slow cooking, Chinese oven cooking, etc. Its dishes tend to be light and fresh, suitable for all. Many of the city's local favorite dishes are based on ducks, including Nanjing salted duck, duck blood and vermicelli soup, and duck oil pancake. The flavor snacks of Jinling Tea House have become an integral part of Qinhuai culture. In addition, Jiangning, Liuhe and Gaochun each have their own local flavors. "Suiyuan Food List", "Baimen Recipe", "Yecheng Vegetable Book" are the crystallization of Nanjing food culture.

The radish is considered typically representative of the people of Nanjing, an association commonly known throughout China. Nanjing people like to eat wild vegetables during the Qingming Festival, and they named the eight most eaten spring vegetables and wild vegetables as the "Eight Dry Seasons". The phrase "eight fresh sweet-scented osmanthus fragrance" refers to eight kinds of aquatic fruits and vegetables associated with the Mid-Autumn Festival.

=== Sports ===
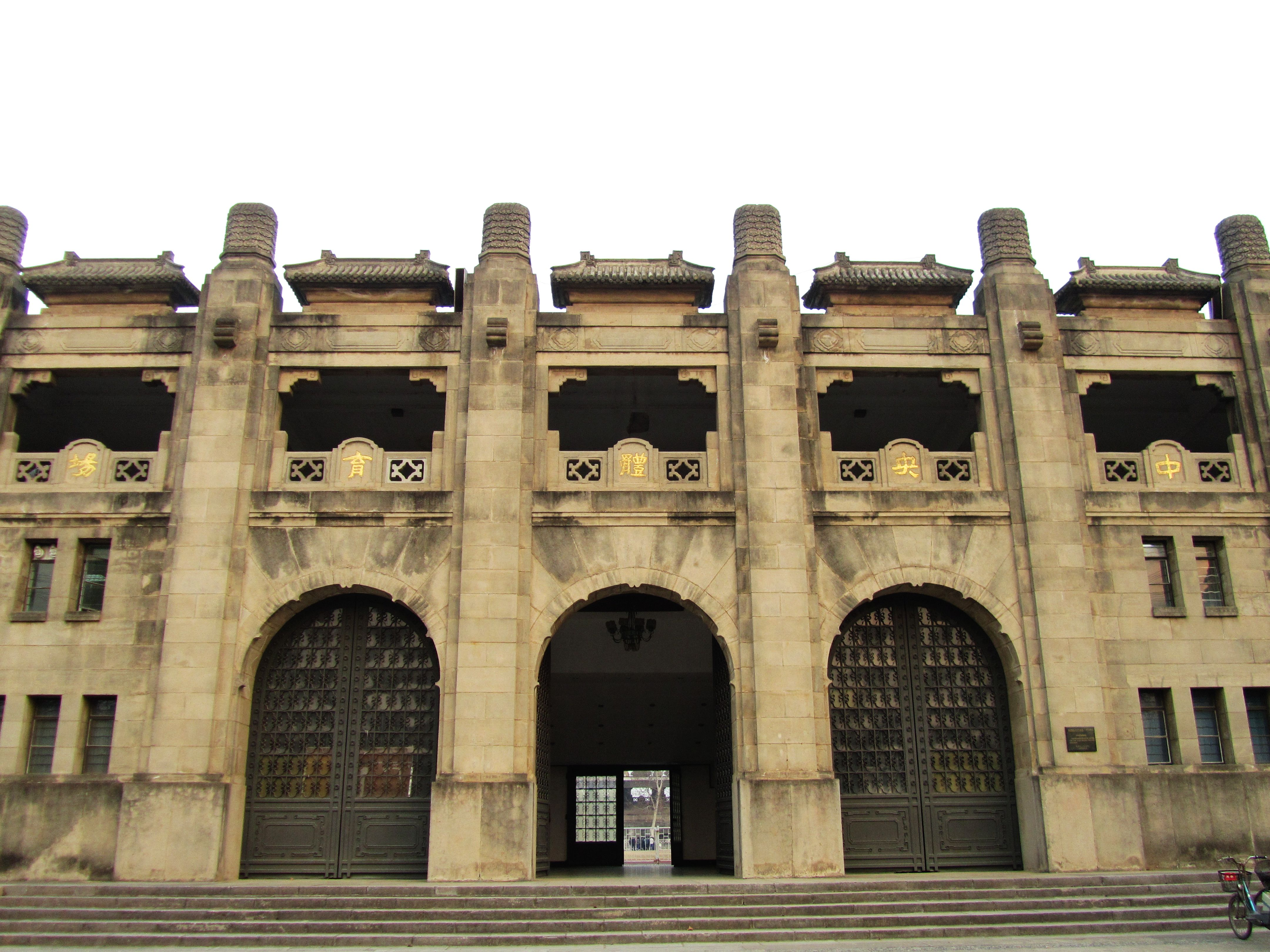
Central Stadium was built in 1937

Nanjing is the birthplace of modern Chinese sports. In 1910, the first National Games in Chinese history was held. In 1924, the predecessor of the Chinese Olympic Committee (All-China Sports Association) was established in Nanjing. China's first Olympic delegation trained, assembled, and set off in Nanjing. Nanjing is the birthplace of China's Olympic dream and one of the cities that contributed the most to China's participation in the Olympics. Nanjing has an irreplaceable position in the history of the Chinese Olympics.

Nanjing's planned 20,000 seat Youth Olympic Sports Park Gymnasium will be one of the venues for the 2019 FIBA Basketball World Cup.

As a major Chinese city, Nanjing is home to many professional sports teams. 2020 Chinese Super League champions Jiangsu Football Club, owned by Suning Appliance Group, was a tenant of Nanjing Olympic Sports Center from 2007 until the club's dissolution in 2021. Jiangsu Nangang Basketball Club is a competitive team which has long been one of the major clubs fighting for the title in China top-level league, CBA. Jiangsu Volleyball men and women teams are also traditionally considered as at top level in China volleyball league.

There are two major sports centers in Nanjing, Wutaishan Sports Center and Nanjing Olympic Sports Center. Both of these two are comprehensive sports centers, including stadium, gymnasium, natatorium, tennis court, etc. Wutaishan Sports Center was established in 1952 and it was one of the oldest and most advanced stadiums in early time of People's Republic of China.

Nanjing hosted the 10th National Games of PRC in 2005 and hosted the 2nd summer Youth Olympic Games in 2014.

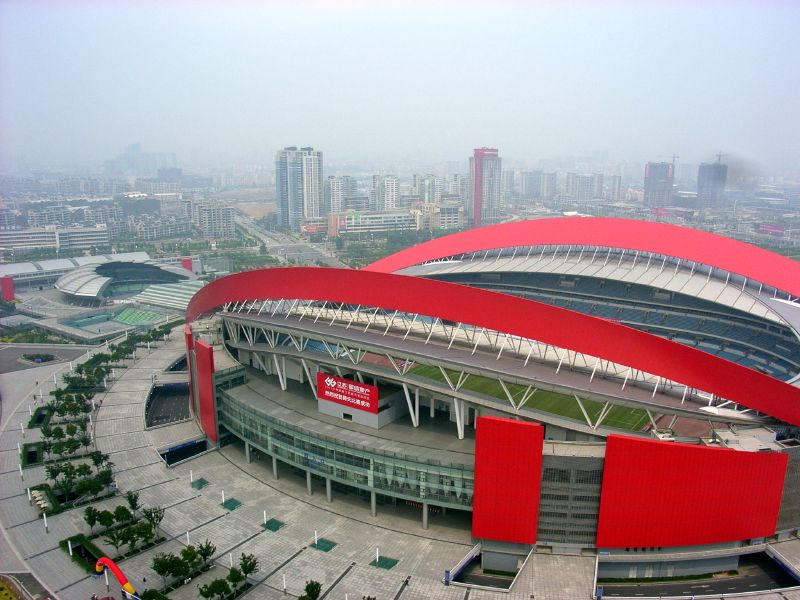
Nanjing Olympic Sports Center

In 2005, to host The 10th National Game of People's Republic of China, there was a new stadium, Nanjing Olympic Sports Center, constructed in Nanjing. Compared to Wutaishan Sports Center, which the major stadium's capacity is 18,500, Nanjing Olympic Sports Center has a more advanced stadium which is big enough to seat 60,000 spectators. Its gymnasium has capacity of 13,000, and natatorium of capacity 3,000.

On February 10, 2010, the 122nd IOC session at Vancouver announced Nanjing as the host city for the 2nd Summer Youth Olympic Games. The Nanjing 2014 Youth Olympic Games featured all 28 sports on the Olympic program and were held from August 16 to 28. It is the first time that China has hosted the Youth Olympic Games and the second time that China has hosted an Olympic event.

Main venues: Nanjing Olympic Sports Center, Wutaishan Sports Center, Youth Olympic Sports Park, Nanjing Institute of Physical Education (Central Stadium), Nanjing Longjiang Stadium, Nanjing National Fitness Center, Jiangning Sports Center, Lishui Sports Center, Gaochun Sports Center, etc.

Main teams: Jiangsu Football Club (dissolved), Nanjing Monkey Kings, Jiangsu Dragons (a.k.a. Jiangsu Nangang), etc.

=== Architecture ===
The city is renowned for its wide variety of architectures which mainly contain buildings from multiple dynasties, the Republic of China, and the present.

==== Inside the walled city ====
- City Wall of Nanjing (南京城墙)
- Zhonghua Gate (中华门)
- Fuzimiao (Confucius Temple; 南京夫子庙) and Qinhuai River (秦淮河)
- Jiangnan Examination Hall (江南贡院)
- Zhan Garden (瞻园)
- Mendong (Laomendong; 老门东)
- Taoye Ferry (桃叶渡)
- Ming Palace (明故宫)
- Xu Garden (煦园)
- Jiming Temple (鸡鸣寺)
- Beiji Ge (北极阁)
- Drum Tower of Nanjing (南京鼓楼)
- Chaotian Palace (朝天宫)
- Stone City (石头城)
- Yuejiang Tower (阅江楼)
- Jinghai Temple (静海寺)
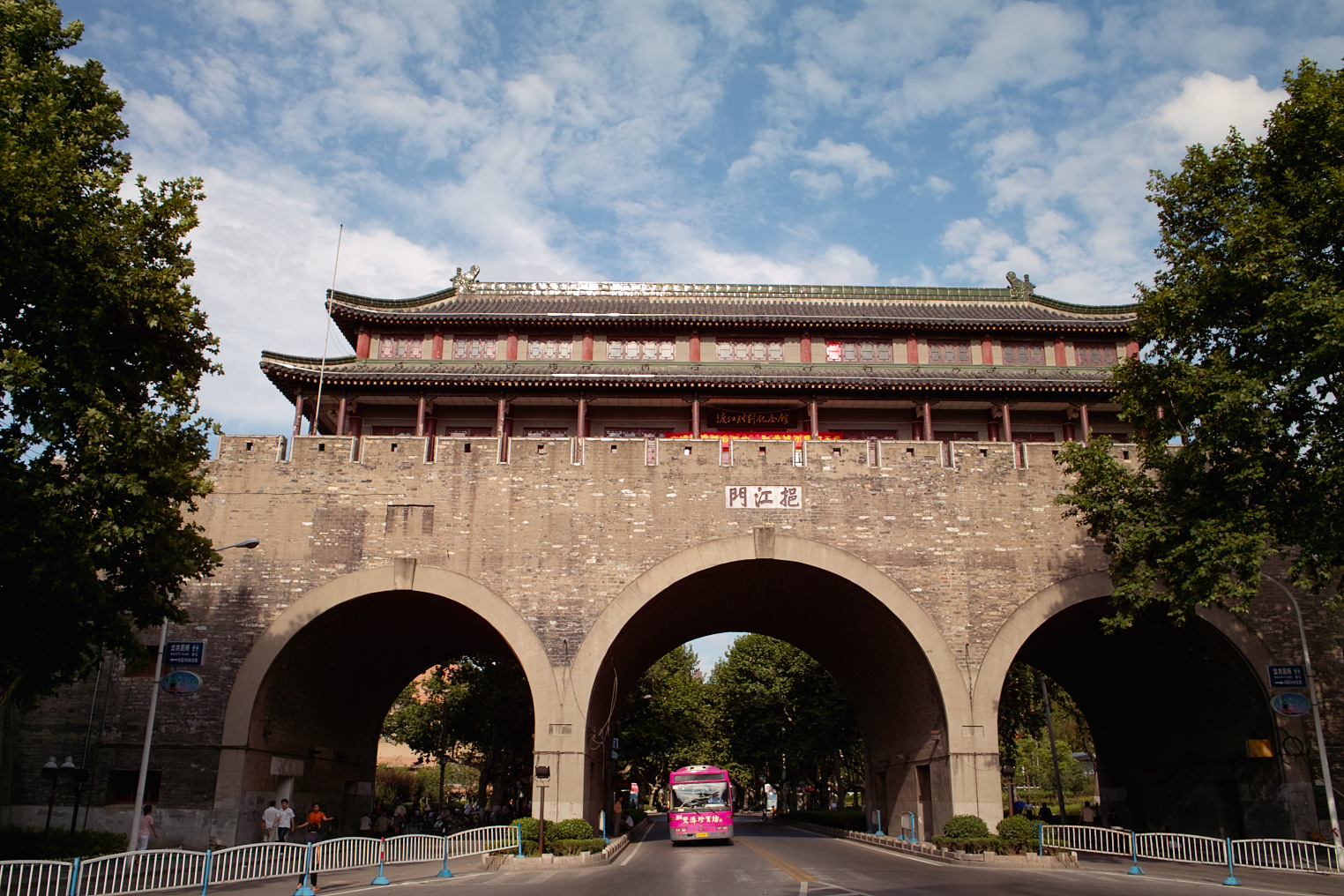
City Wall of Nanjing and Yijiangmen Gate

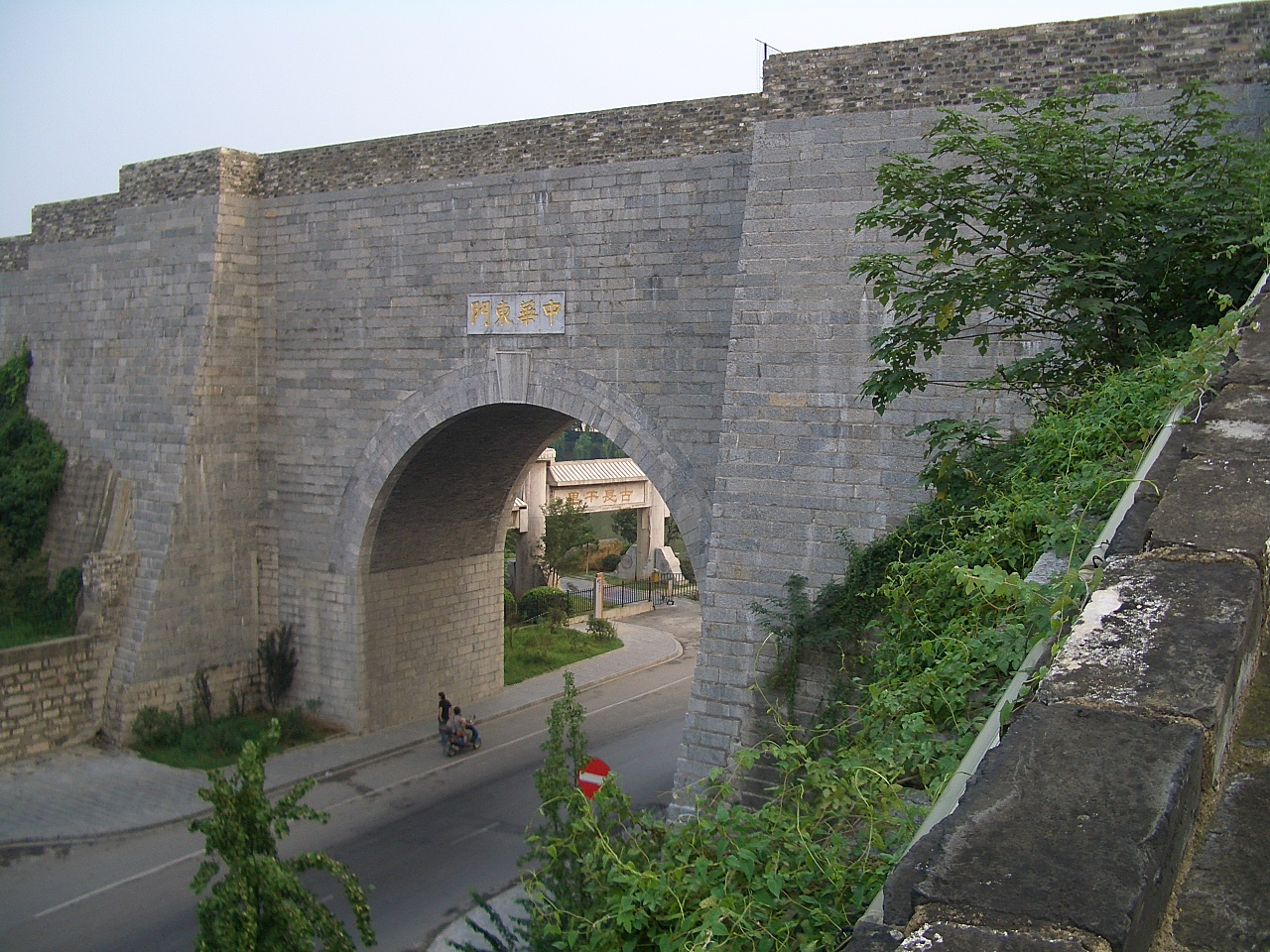
East of Zhonghua Gate

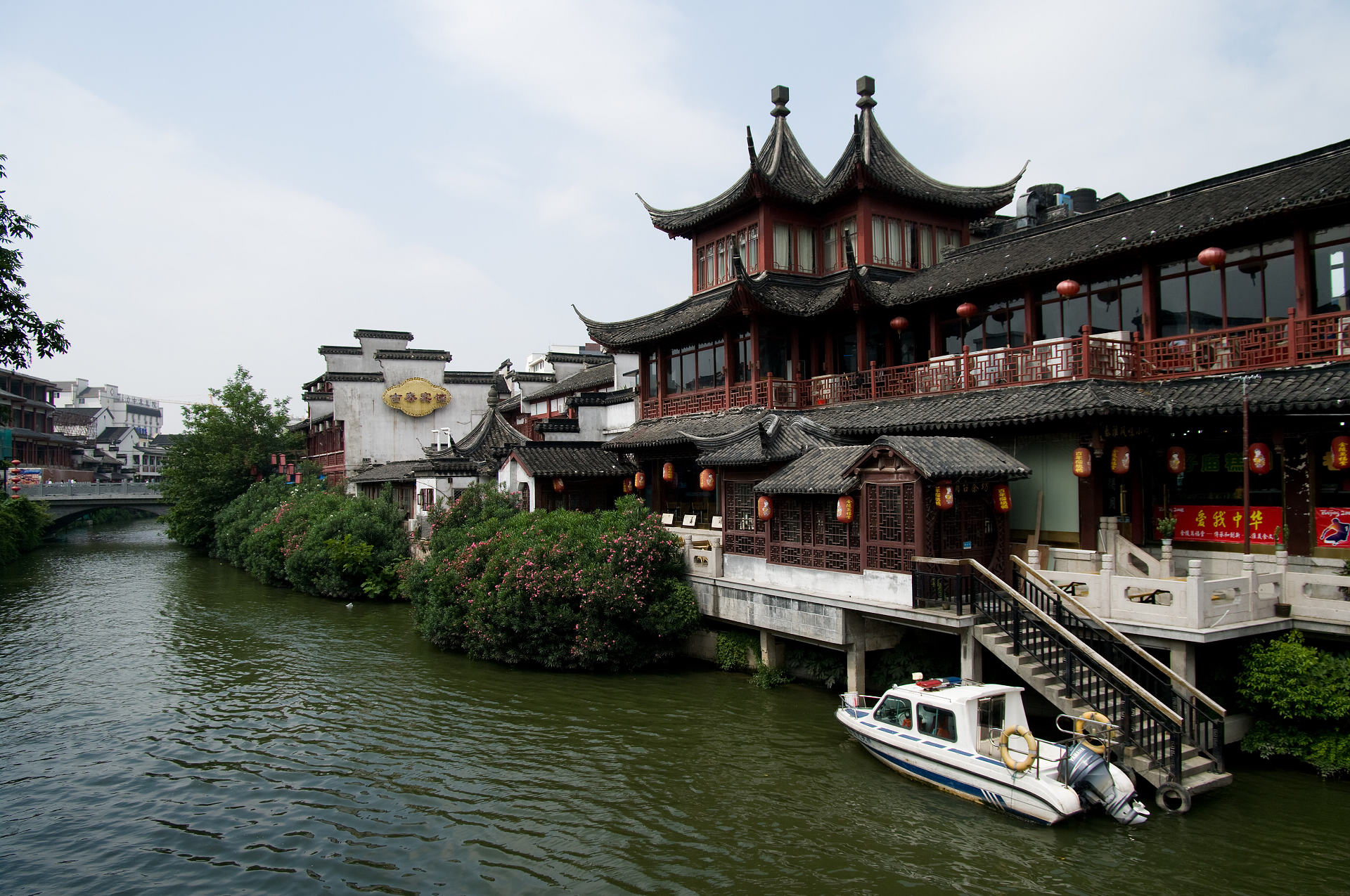
Qinhuai River

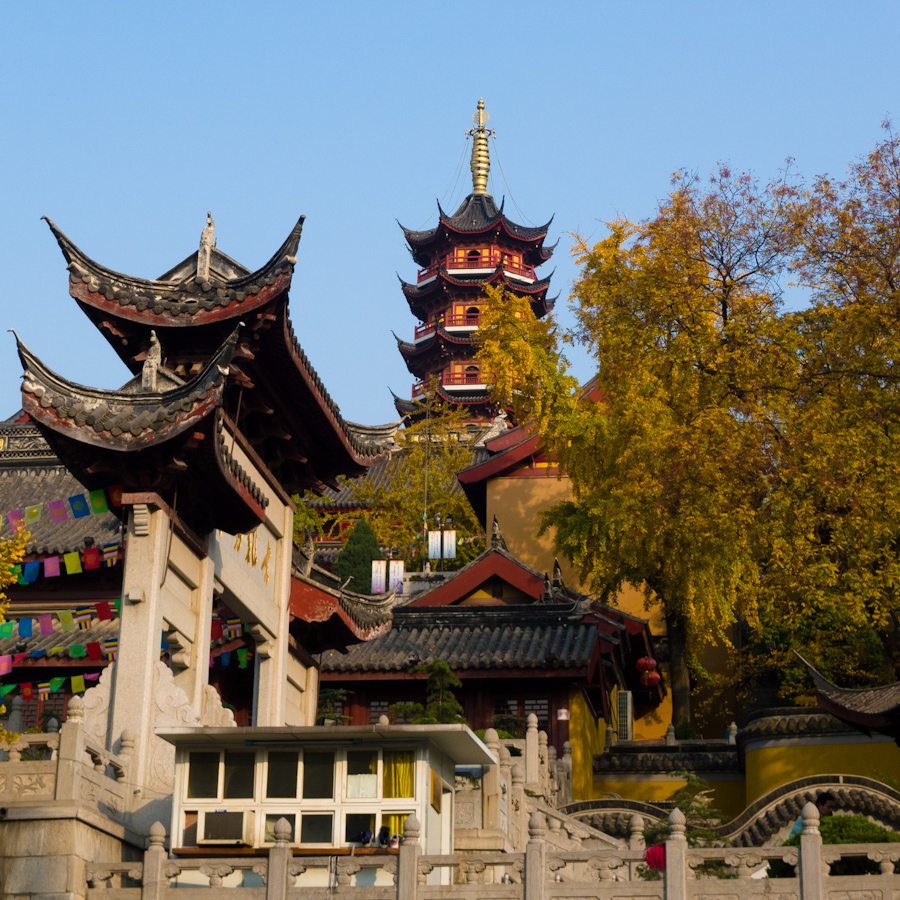
Jiming Temple

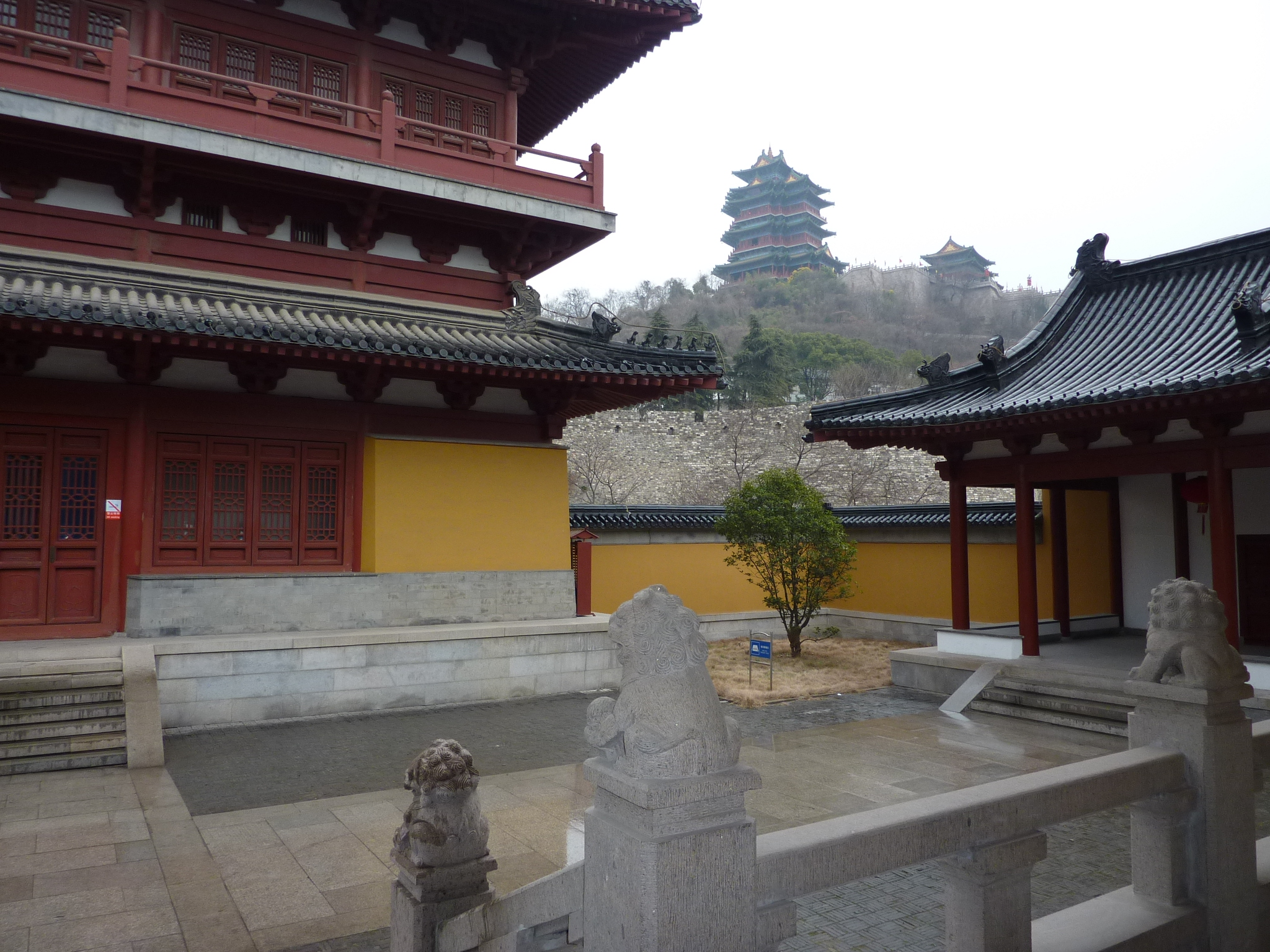
Jinghai Temple and Yuejiang Tower

==== Outside the walled city ====
- Purple Mountain Scenic Area (紫金山)
- Ming Xiaoling Mausoleum and its surrounding complex (明孝陵)
- Linggu Temple (灵谷寺)
- Xuanwu Lake (玄武湖)
- Qixia Temple (栖霞寺)
- Dingshan Temple (定山寺)
- The Porcelain Pagoda of Nanjing (restored) (大报恩寺琉璃塔)
- Mochou Lake (莫愁湖)
- Yangshan Quarry (阳山碑材)
- Southern Tang Mausoleums (南唐二陵)
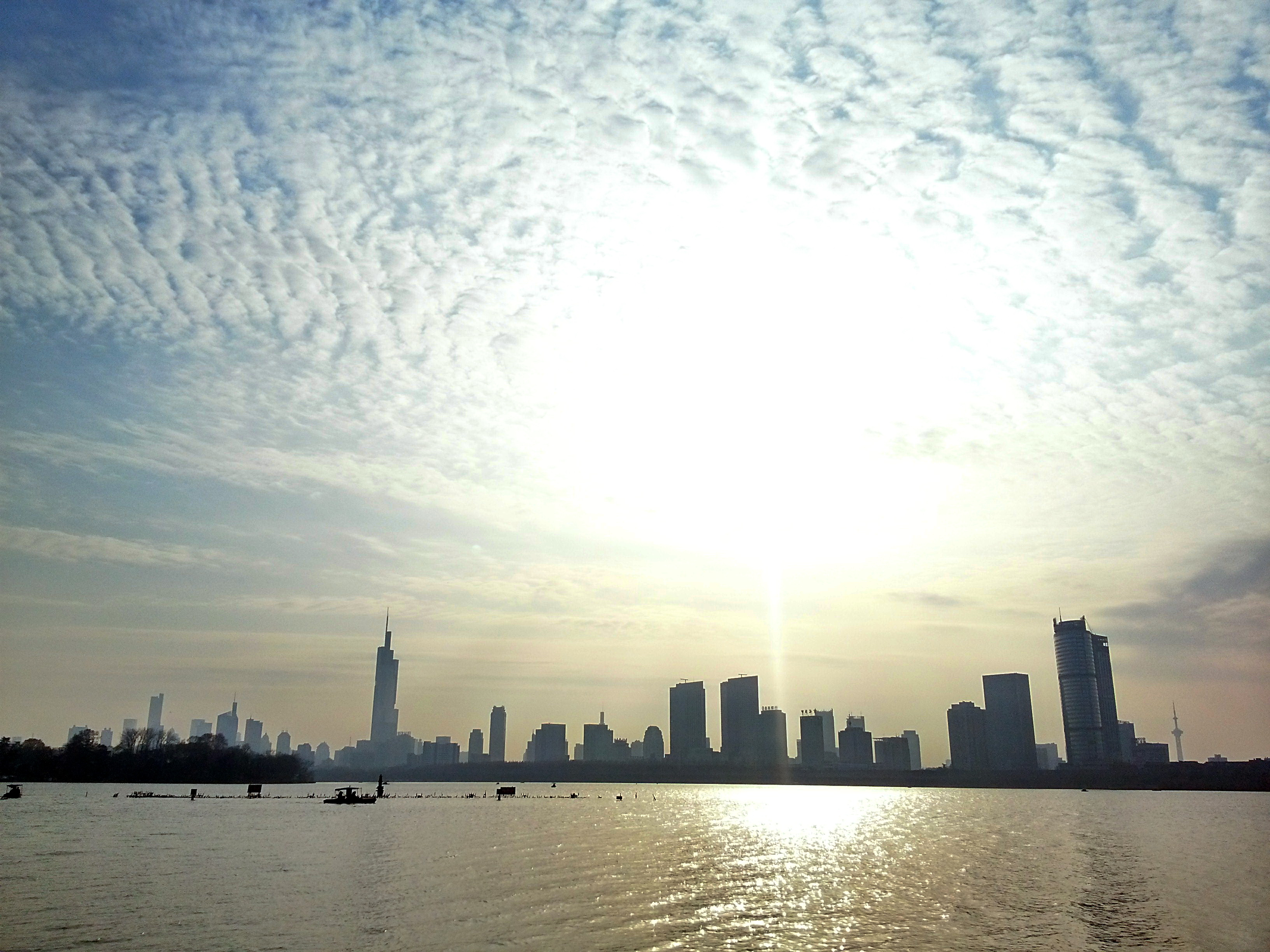
Xuanwu Lake

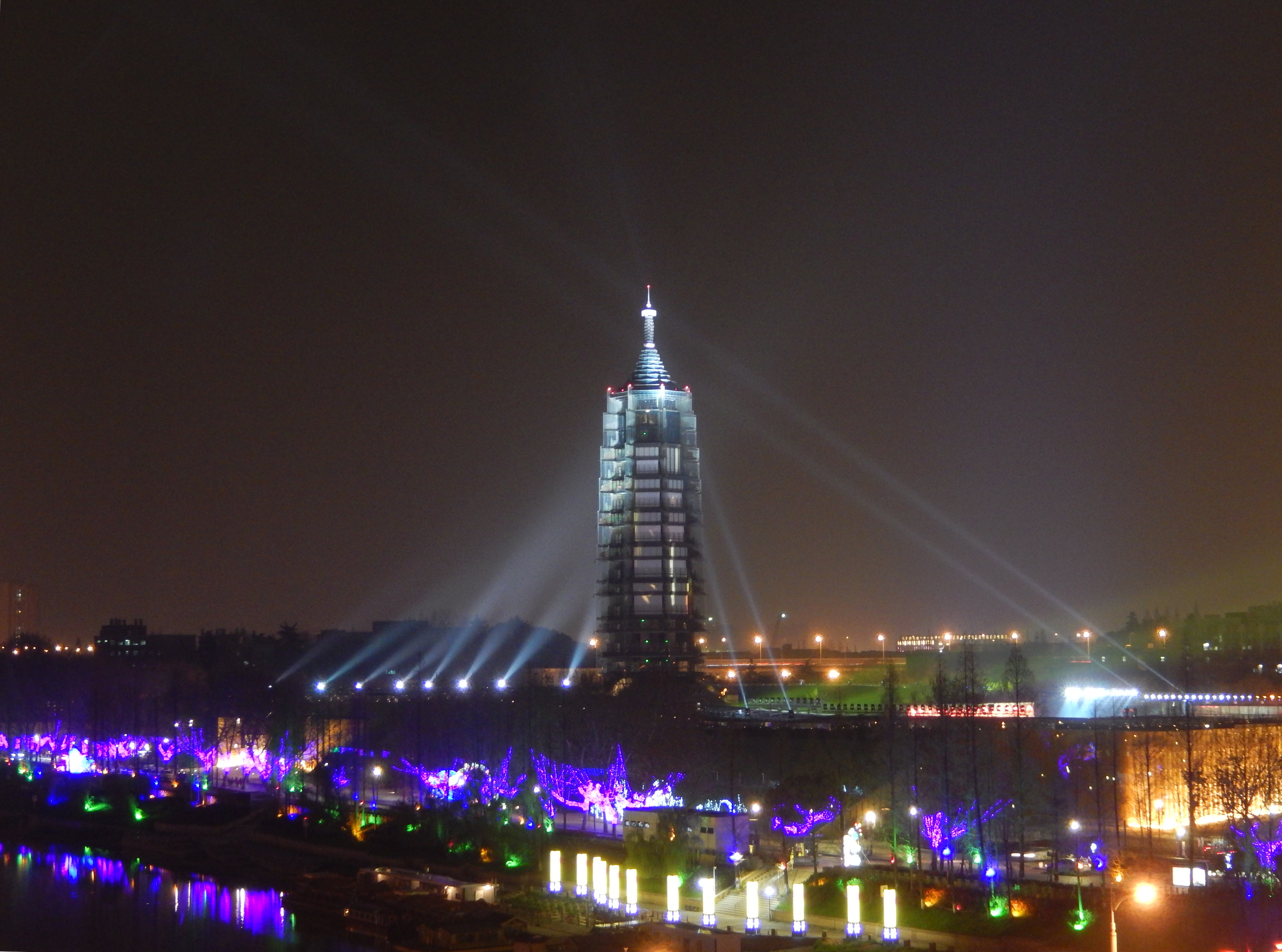
The Porcelain Pagoda of Nanjing

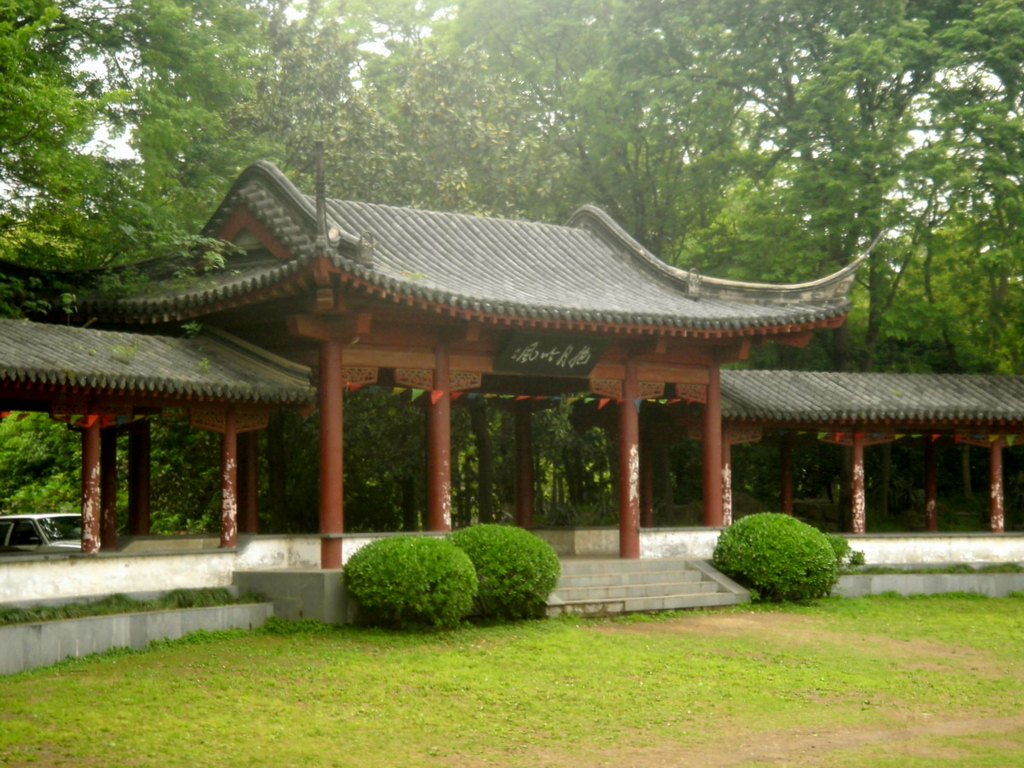
Classical buildings in the Mochou Lake

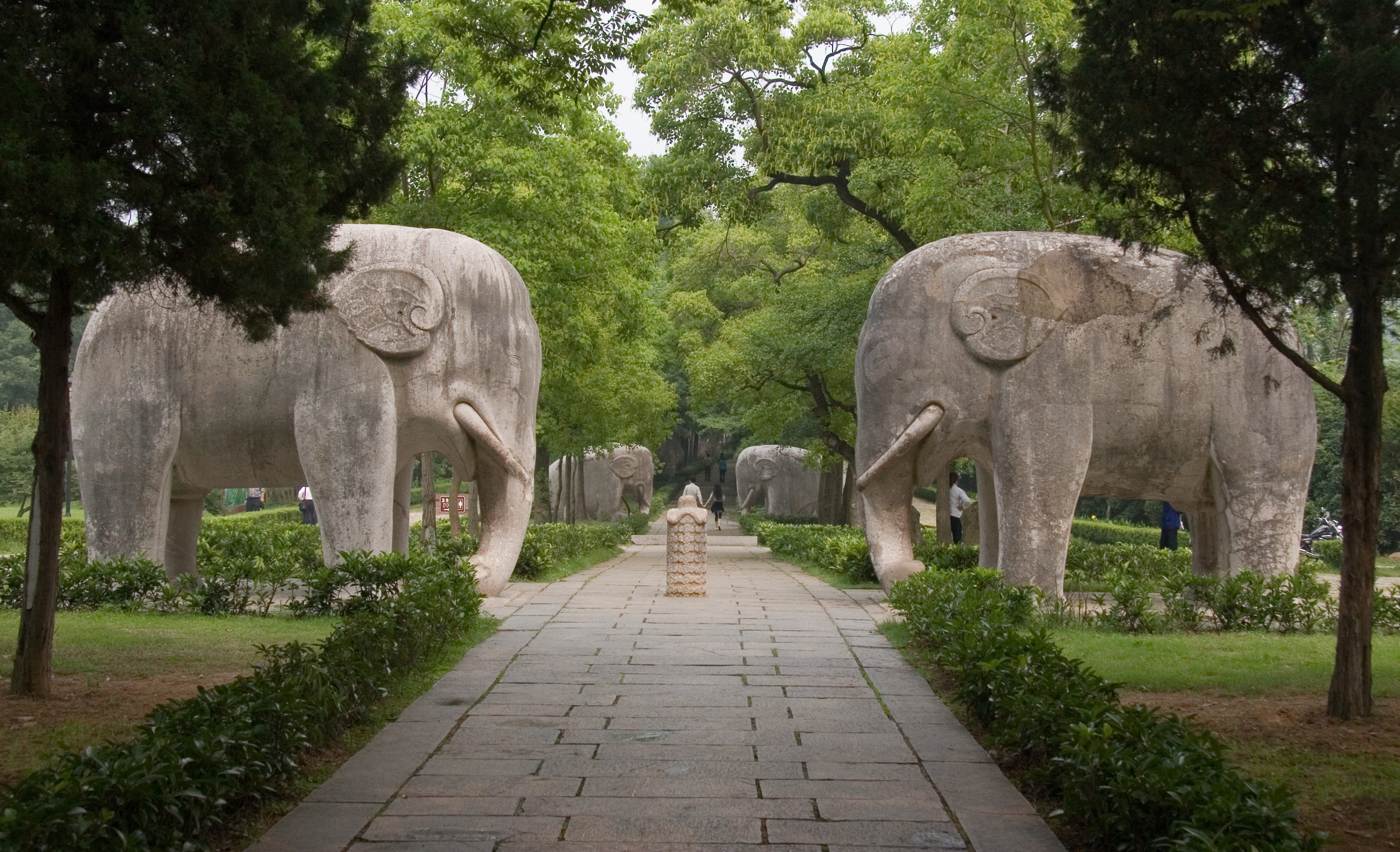
Spirit Way of Ming Xiaoling Mausoleum

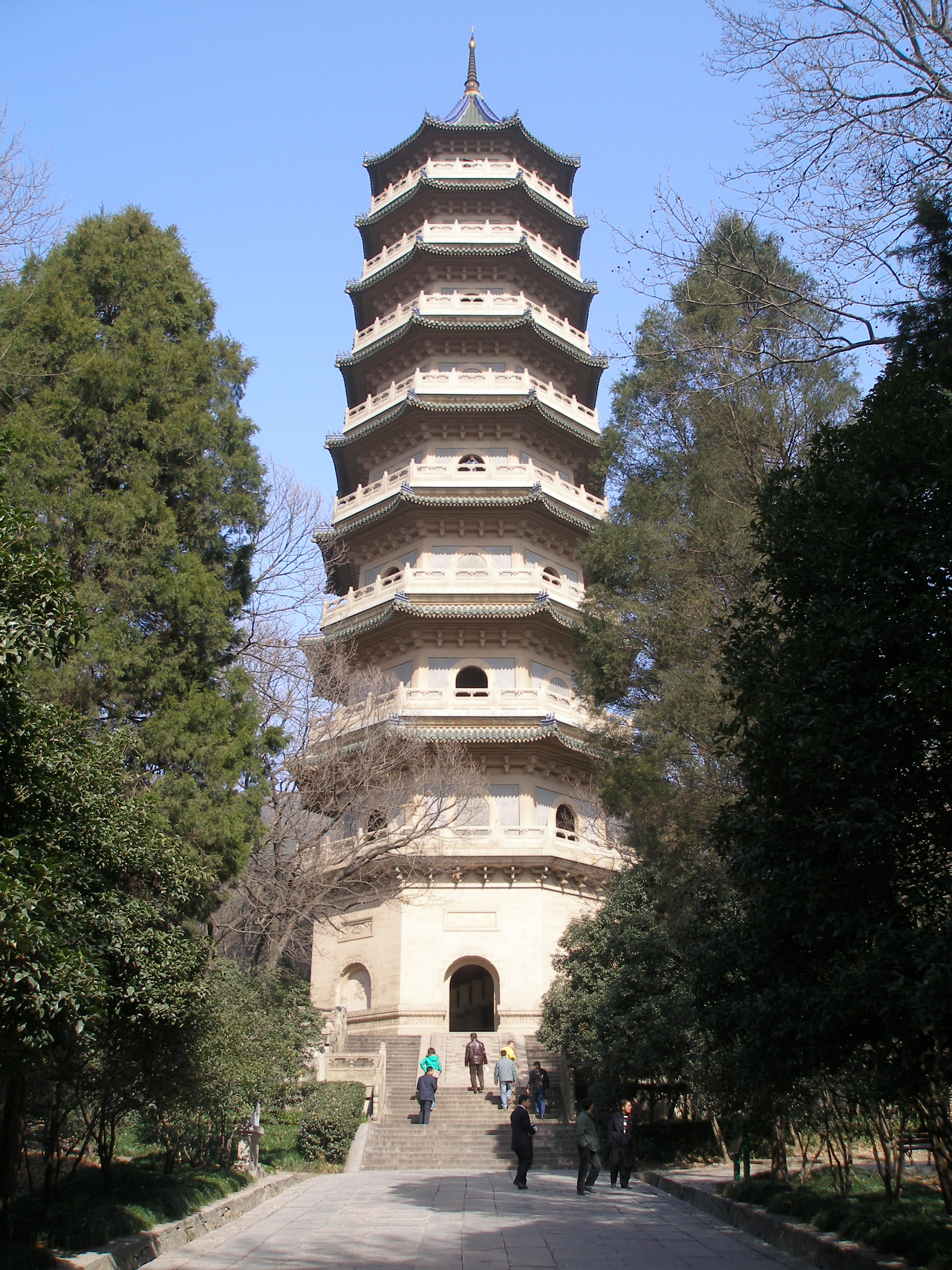
Tower of Linggu Temple

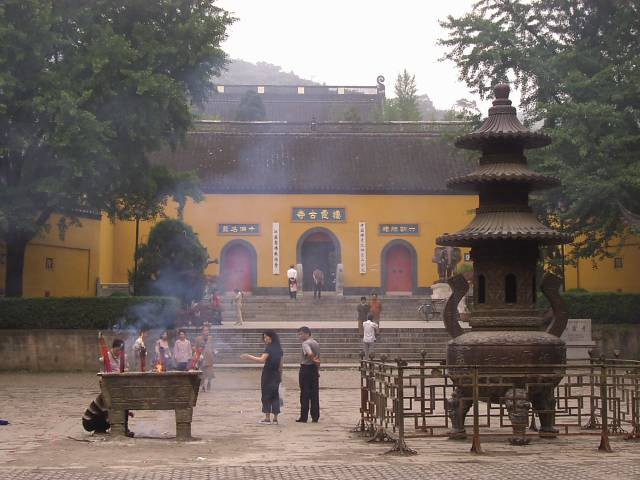
Qixia Temple

=== Symbols ===
- City Tree: Cedar
- City Flower: Prunus mume
- Tourist city symbol: Long Pan Tiger Standing

=== Folklore ===
The main folklore activities in Nanjing include Chinese New Year greetings for the Spring Festival, hanging Spring Festival couplets at the city gate, eating rice cakes, welcoming the God of Wealth on the fifth day of the first lunar month, climbing the city on the 16th day of the first lunar month, sweeping the tomb on Qingming Festival, dragon boat races on the Dragon Boat Festival, eating rice dumplings, and begging for gifts on Qixi Festival, Liqiu gnawing autumn, Mid-Autumn reunion, eating moon cakes, enjoy the moon and go to the melon rack in the field and pick melon beans under the bean shed, Chongyang ascends, Chongyang cake inserted Chongyang flag, Laba food porridge, sent stove on the 24th lunar month, New Year's Eve reunion and ancestor worship.

=== Literature ===
The first "Literature Museum" in Chinese history, the first literary theory and criticism monograph "Wen Xin Diao Long", the earliest existing collection of poetry and essays "Selected Works of Zhaoming", China's first poetic theory and criticism monograph "Shi Pin" ", the first collection of zhiren novel," Shi Shuo Xin Yu, "and the first children's enlightenment book "Thousand Characters "were all born in Nanjing. Masterpieces such as "A Dream of Red Mansions" and "The Scholars" are inseparable from Nanjing.

Modern literary giants such as Lu Xun, Ba Jin, Zhu Ziqing, Yu Pingbo, Zhang Henshui, Zhang Ailing have inextricably linked with Nanjing, and the masterpiece "The Earth" by the American writer Pearl Buck who won the Nobel Prize for Literature was created in Nanjing. Famous contemporary literary writers in Nanjing include Su Tong, Bi Feiyu and Ye Zhaoyan.

=== Film and television ===
In 1950, 1,800 projectionists from around the country traveled to Nanjing for a training program. These projectionists replicated the training program in their own home provinces to develop more projectionists. Nanjing was later termed a "Cradle of People's Cinema."

Nanjing, as the ancient capital of the Six Dynasties and a famous scenic spot, has become a location favored by directors. Among them, the 93 edition of "Legend of the New White Lady" was shot at Jiming Temple in Nanjing; "Deep Love and Rain" shot at Nanjing Pukou Railway Station; "The Founding of the People's Republic" shot at Sun Yat-sen Mausoleum, Meiling Palace, Southeast University Auditorium, etc. .; and more movies and TV series "Jinling Thirteen Hairpins", "To Our Dying Youth", "Tuina", etc. were all shot in Nanjing.

=== Music and dance ===
Jinling Qin School is an important genre of Chinese Guqin art that originated in Nanjing. It has a great influence on many later generations of Qin Schools. It originated from the Royal Music Officials of the Ming dynasty and has been listed as a World Intangible Cultural Heritage Project. The folk song "Jasmine Flower" originated from the "Flower Tune" sung by Liuhe folks, and is world-famous. Xishanqiao folk song performances have repeatedly appeared on CCTV. In addition, there are Gaochun folk songs "Caihongling", "Planting Seedlings in May", Liuhe folk songs "Flower Tune", "Liuzuo Blow Music" etc.

The Nanjing Forest Music Concert, sponsored by the Propaganda Department of the Jiangsu Provincial Party Committee and the Nanjing Municipal People's Government, was born in 2015. Since 2014, Jiangsu Music Broadcasting will hold the Midou Music Festival in Nanjing every year. The 7th Midou Music Festival; and the popular Nanjing University Student Music Festival in recent years.

Traditional folk dances in Nanjing include Luoshan Dragon, Dongba Dama Lantern, Sparrow Jump, Jiangpu Hand Lion, Gaochun Dance Wuban, Wanbei Xiaoma Lantern Dance, Qixia Dragon Dance, Changlu Carrying Dragon, Tongshan Gaotai Lion Dance, Dongba Peiqiao stilts, Longyin Che, Zhetang Shahuo, Dangdang, Luohan, Zhuzhen stilts are all intangible cultural heritages.

Created by the Nanjing Dancers Association, the original local drama "The Place Closest to Dream", with students from the Department of Music of the School of Aeronautics and Astronautics as the performance team, shows youthful demeanor with the theme of youth entrepreneurship; performed by Nanjing folk performing artists "Drum and Dragon Celebrating the New Year" is a classic of Nanjing folk dance in recent years; the "Nanjing City Intangible Cultural Heritage Scene Demonstration" Jinling Season "hosted by Nanjing Cultural Bureau and undertaken by Nanjing Art Museum is a work of high artistic level.

In Nanjing, the first professional children's art school in the country that integrates cultural education, art education and stage performances, Nanjing Art Primary School, referred to as Nanjing Xiaohonghua Art Troupe was built. The school implements small-class education in an all-round way, and promotes both culture and art. It has been rated as a meritorious unit in Nanjing many times, and twice was awarded the honorary title of "National Children's Cultural Work Advanced Group" by the Central Ministry of Culture.

=== Photography ===
Nanjing has many photography works, as well as large-scale photography exhibitions, photography conferences, etc. Zhao Ran's "Quadette of Enchanting Hair", Ben Daochun's "Tianjiang Cruise", Tian Ming's "Shanghai White-collar Early Class Subway Life", Yu Xianyun's "In the Name of the Country" won 21st, 22nd, 23rd, The 25th National Photographic Art Exhibition Gold Award; Liu Jun's "Fisher Songs and Moon" won the 21st Austria Trembler Super Photo Tour Competition Gold Award; Sun Chonglin's "Little Wangmu" Gold Award in the second PSAChina International Photography Competition.

The Nanjing Photographic Association successfully held the third city photography conference in Nanjing; held photography exhibitions such as "World Historical and Cultural Cities", "Hong Kong in the Eyes of Nanjing People", "Nanjing in the Eyes of College Students"; in Italy, Japan, Singapore, and other countries held "Splendid Nanjing" and "Ancient Capital Nanjing" photography exhibitions in Italy, Japan, Singapore, and other countries; held "Harmonious Nanjing", "I Love Nanjing", "Nanjing City Walls", "Four Seasons Jinling" and other photography competitions; edited and published "Nanjing New Look", "Nanjing", "Splendid Nanjing", "Brilliant Nanjing", "Nanjing City Wall" and other large-scale picture albums.

In 2022, the photography competition, "A Decade of Nanjing", organised by Nanjing People's Association for Friendship with Foreign Countries (NPAFFC), sought to chart the changes in Nanjing through the eyes of foreigners living in the city. Almost half a million online votes were cast to decide the final winners.

=== Folk crafts ===
Nanjing has many traditional folk crafts, including brocade, paper-cutting, gold leaf, folding fans, and velvet flowers.

As of 2019, Nanjing has 4 world human intangible cultural heritage projects (guqin art, Nanjing cloud brocade weaving, Chinese engraving, and printing techniques, Chinese paper-cutting), 11 national-level projects, and 64 provincial-level (Jiangsu) projects.

== Education ==
By 2021, Nanjing has 68 institutions of higher learning, including ten 111-plan universities, eight 211 universities, and 97 academicians. As the educational center of southern China for more than 1,700 years, Nanjing has many highly ranked educational institutions, with the number of universities (13) listed in 147 Double First-Class Universities ranking third (after Beijing and Shanghai). The ratio of college students to the total population ranks No.1 among large cities nationwide. Nanjing was ranked 59th globally by the QS Best Student City in 2026.

Nanjing has the fifth-largest scientific research output of any city in the world. When compared to other countries in the region, Nanjing ranked higher than South Korea, securing third place in Asia and Oceania after China and Japan, according to the Nature Index for 2025. For instance, Nanjing's share of the 2024 Nature Index is 2,135.61, with a count of 4,282, while South Korea's share is 2,017.95, with 3,431 counts. Since 2022, it has been ranked as the world's top second scientific research center in earth & environmental sciences after Beijing and the world's top third scientific research center in chemistry, physical sciences, and natural sciences after Beijing and Shanghai, according to the Nature Index.

Nanjing University is considered one of the top national universities nationwide, and it is ranked among the world's top 10 universities by Nature Index. As of 2026, Nanjing University ranked 7th in China, 13th in Asia and 62nd globally by Times Higher Education World University Rankings. Southeast University is also among the top universities in China, ranking 89th globally. It is considered one of the best universities for Architecture and Engineering in China. Many universities in Nanjing have satellite campuses or have moved their main campus to Xianlin University City in the eastern suburb. Some of the other most prominent national universities in Nanjing are:

Some of the other most prominent national universities in Nanjing are:

- Nanjing University
- Southeast University
- Hohai University
- Nanjing Normal University
- Nanjing Xiaozhuang University
- Nanjing University of Aeronautics and Astronautics
- Nanjing University of Science and Technology
- Nanjing Tech University
- Nanjing Institute of Technology
- Nanjing University of Information Science and Technology
- Nanjing Audit University
- Nanjing University of Finance and Economics
- Nanjing University of Posts and Telecommunications
- Nanjing Agricultural University
- Nanjing Forestry University
- China Pharmaceutical University
- Nanjing Medical University
- Nanjing University of Chinese Medicine
- Nanjing Sport Institute
- Nanjing Arts Institute
- Jiangsu Second Normal University

Private universities and colleges, such as Communication University of China, Nanjing and Hopkins-Nanjing Center are also located in the city.

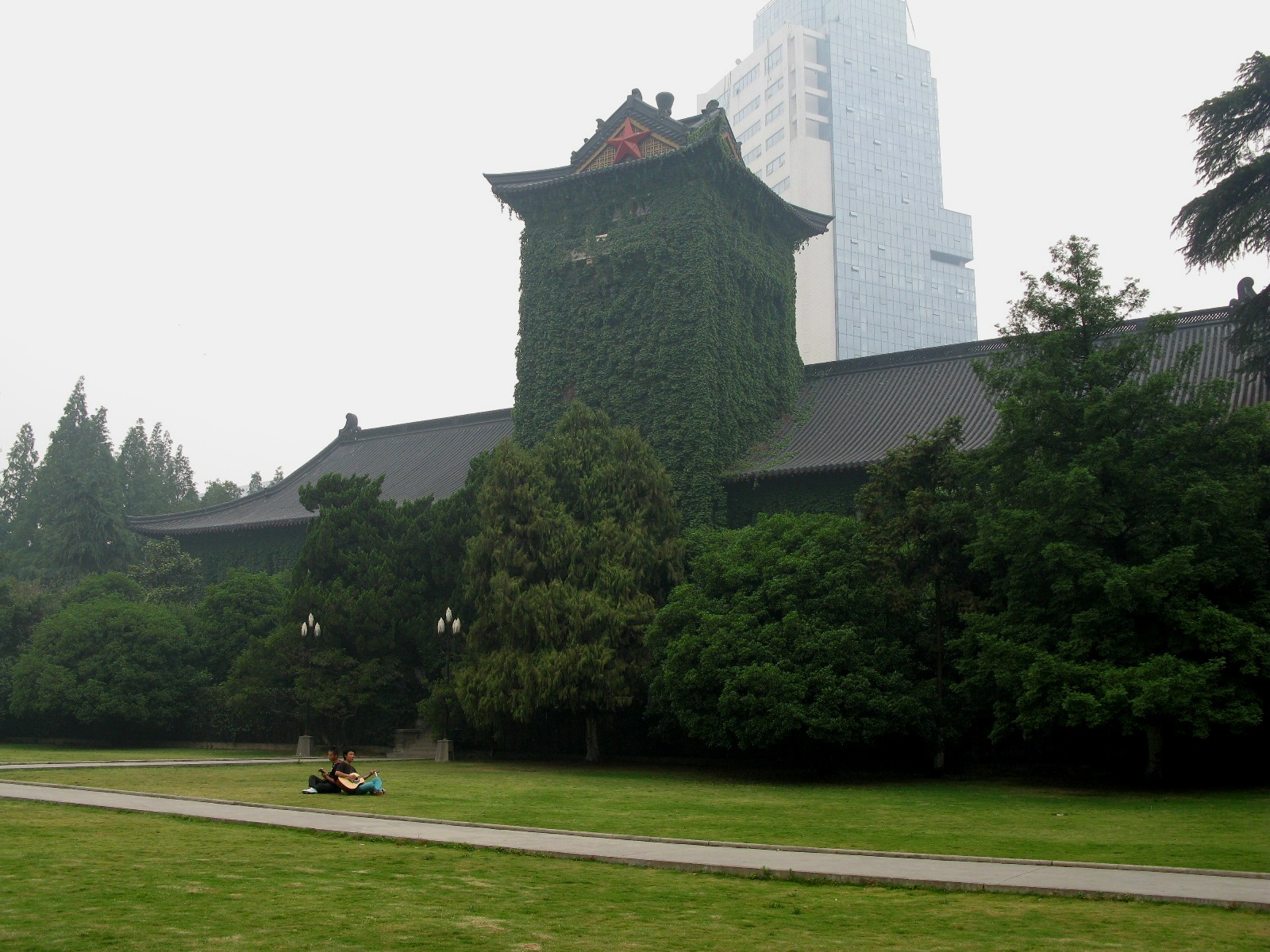
Nanjing University, Gulou campus

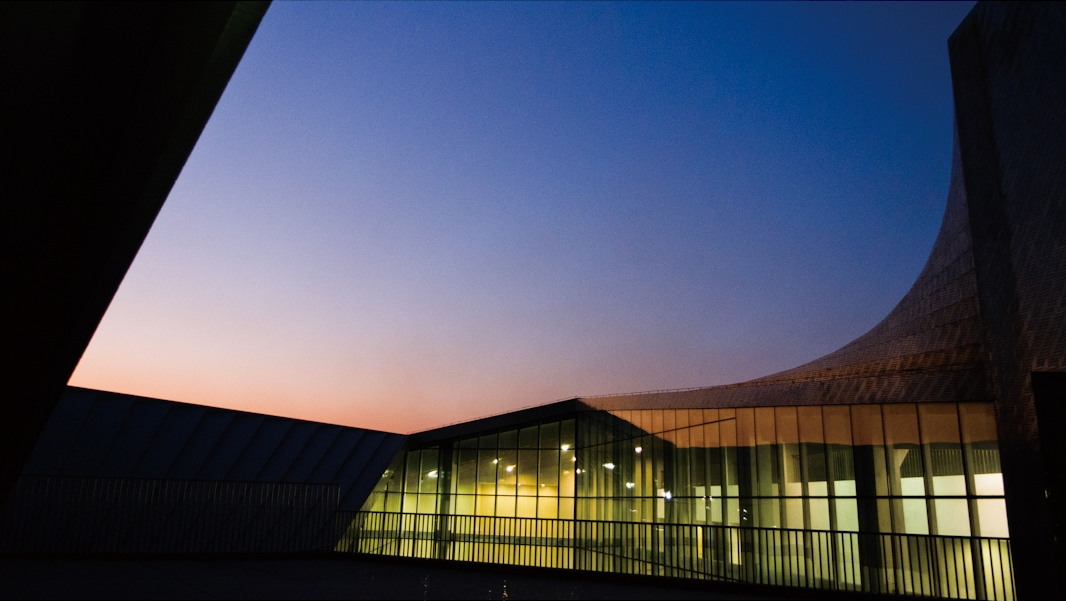
Nanjing University, Xianlin campus

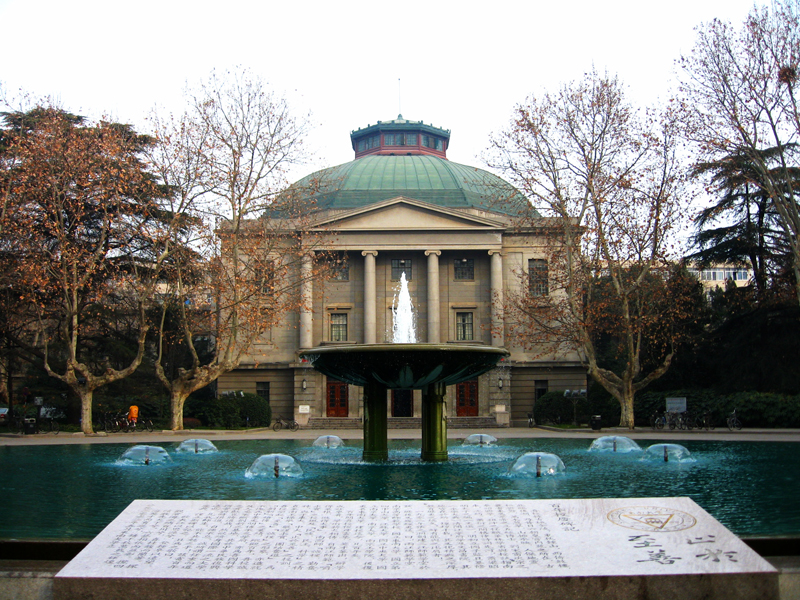
Southeast University, Sipailou campus

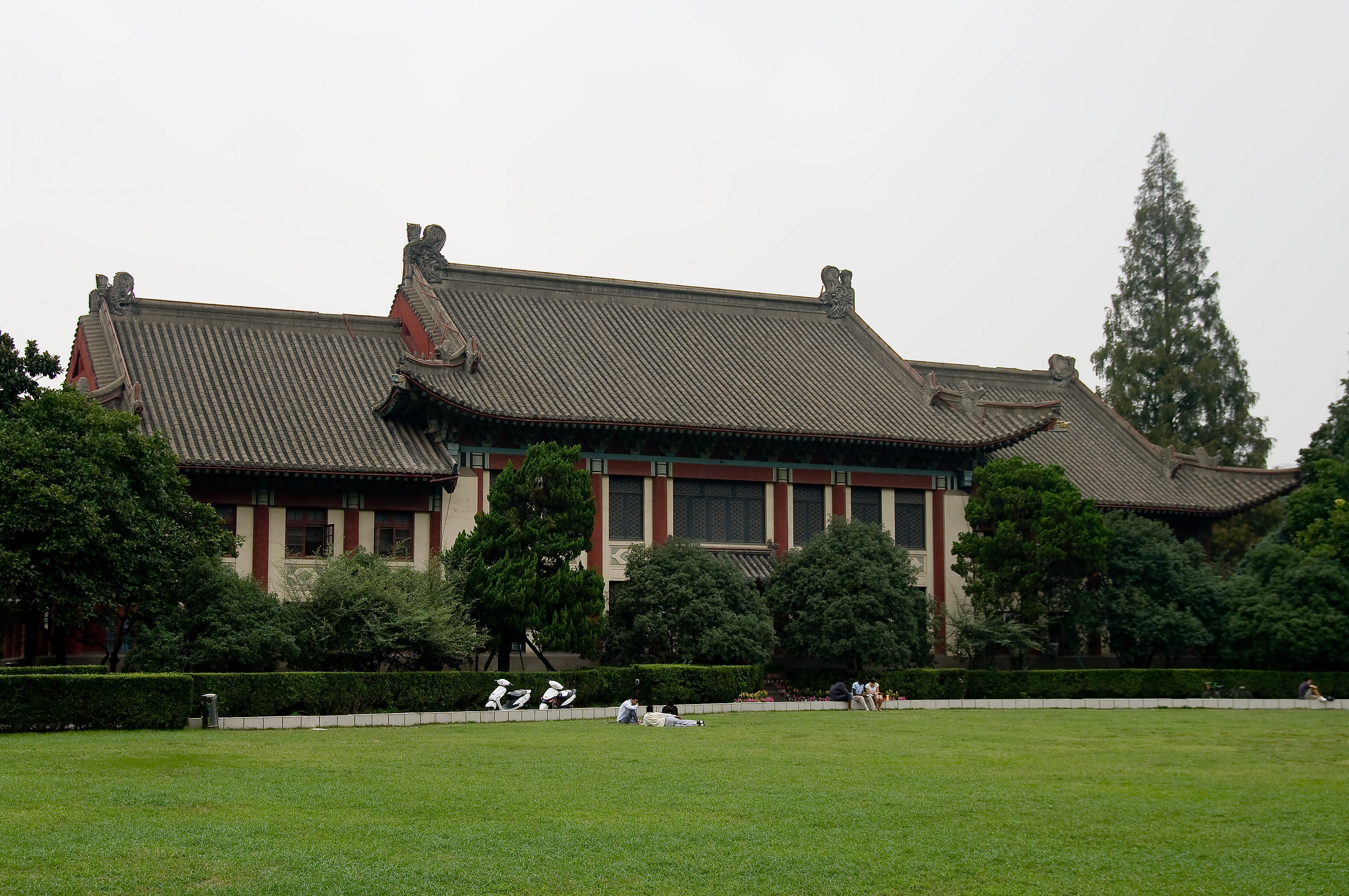
Nanjing Normal University, Suiyuan campus

Some notable high schools in Nanjing are: Jiangpu Senior High School, Jinling High School, Liuhe First School, Nanjing Foreign Language School, The Second Yuying Foreign Languages School of Nanjing, High School Affiliated to Nanjing Normal University, Nanjing No.1 High School, Nanjing Zhonghua High School, Caulfield Grammar School (Nanjing Campus), Nanjing No.29 High School, Yuhuatai Senior High School.

== Sister cities and twin towns ==
Nanjing is twinned with:

- Akko, Israel
- Bandar Seri Begawan, Brunei
- Barranquilla, Colombia
- Biên Hòa, Vietnam
- Birmingham, United Kingdom
- Bloemfontein, South Africa
- City of San Marino, San Marino (2021)
- Concepción, Chile
- Daejeon, South Korea
- Eindhoven, Netherlands
- Florence, Italy
- Katmandu, Nepal
- Leipzig, Germany
- Limassol, Cyprus
- London, Canada
- Malacca City, Malaysia
- Melbourne, Australia
- Mexicali, Mexico
- Mogilev, Belarus
- Nagoya, Japan
- Perth, Australia
- Semarang, Indonesia
- Shiraz, Iran
- Siem Reap, Cambodia
- St. Louis, United States
- Toronto, Canada
- Windhoek, Namibia

Nanjing's sister-city relationship with Nagoya, Japan, was suspended on February 21, 2012, following public comments by Nagoya mayor Takashi Kawamura denying the Nanjing Massacre. Non-governmental relations have been subsequently restored.

== Notable people ==
- Tao Hongjing (456–536), a Taoist scholar, alchemist and pharmacist in the Qi and Liang dynasties of the Southern dynasty.
- Xueqin Cao (1715 or 1724 – 1763 or 1764), Writer; Author of Dream of the Red Chamber
- Fu Shanxiang (born 1833), the only female champion in Chinese history.
- Yu Guangzhong (born 1928), a famous contemporary writer, poet, scholar and translator.
- Anhua Gao (born 1949), Chinese-British author
- Zhang Guiping (born 1951), Chairman of Suning Universal.
- Hsiao Sa (born 1953), Taiwanese author
- Gang Tian (born 1958), Mathematician; Professor at Princeton University
- Luan Jujie (born 1958), Chinese fencer, 1984 Olympic gold medalist
- Wang Shuo (born 1958), a Chinese writer and screenwriter.
- Zhang Xu, (born 1961), Chinese neuroscientist
- Wu Jianmin (born 1962), Chinese democracy activist
- Pan Deng (born 1964), artist and painter
- Deng Zhonghan (born 1968), Chinese electrical engineer and entrepreneur
- Lu Kang (born 1968), Chinese ambassador to Indonesia
- Pu Shu (born 1973), Chinese singer-songwriter
- Mei Ting (born 1975), Chinese actress
- Hai Qing (born 1978), Chinese actress
- Ni Ni (born 1988), Chinese actress
- Shiran Wang (born 1989), Chinese pianist
- Wu Lei (born 1991), Chinese footballer
- Xu Anqi (born 1992), Chinese fencer
- Zhang Zetian (born 1993), youngest Chinese female billionaire
- Lu Keran (born 1995), Chinese singer-dancer
- Cenyu Han (born 2004), racing driver

== See also ==
- City Wall of Nanjing
- Jiangnan
- List of twin towns and sister cities in China
- Ming Palace
- Niushoushan
- Wuyi Lane
- New first-tier city

== Notes ==
Preceded by Beijing	Capital of China; 1368–1420	Succeeded by Beijing
Preceded by Beijing	Capital of China; 1928–1937	Succeeded by Wuhan (wartime)
Preceded by Chongqing (wartime)	Capital of China; 1945–1949	Succeeded by Guangzhou (after April 23); Taipei (de facto) for the Republic of China
Preceded by Chongqing (wartime)	Capital of China; 1945–1949	Succeeded by Beijing for the People's Republic of China
