= Amber Light =

Amber Light may refer to:

- Amber light, light on a traffic light
- "Amber Light", a song by Mike Oldfield from The Millennium Bell (1999)
- "Amber Light", a song by Train from AM Gold (2022)

== See also ==
- Amber (color)
- Black Light (disambiguation)
- Blue Light (disambiguation)
- Green Light (disambiguation)
- Red Light (disambiguation)
