= Green Light =

Green Light, green light, green-light or greenlight may refer to:

- Green-colored light, part of the visible spectrum
- Greenlight, formal approval of a project to move forward

== Arts, entertainment, and media ==
=== Films and television ===
- Green Light (1937 film), starring Errol Flynn
- Green Light (2002 film), a Turkish film written and directed by Faruk Aksoy
- "Green Light" (Breaking Bad), a third-season episode of Breaking Bad
- The Green Light (film), a 1964 Soviet comedy film
- The Green Light (The Morning Show), an episode of the American television series The Morning Show

=== Literature ===
- Green Light, a 1935 novel by Lloyd C. Douglas
- "Green Light", the final passage of F. Scott Fitzgerald's novel The Great Gatsby
- Greenlights (book), a 2020 book by Matthew McConaughey

=== Music ===
==== Albums ====
- Green Light (Bonnie Raitt album), 1982
- Green Light (Cliff Richard album), 1978
- The Green Light, a 2009 mixtape by Bow Wow

==== Songs ====
- "Green Light" (Beyoncé song), from B'Day, 2006
- "Green Light" (Cliff Richard song), from the album of the same name, 1979
- "Green Light" (John Legend song), from Evolver, 2008
- "Green Light" (Lorde song), from Melodrama, 2017
- "Green Light" (Roll Deep song), from Winner Stays On, 2010
- "Green Light", by the American Breed from Bend Me, Shape Me, 1968
- "Green Light", by the Bicycles from Oh No, It's Love, 2008
- "Green Light", by Danny Brown from Stardust, 2025
- "Green Light", by Girls' Generation from Lion Heart, 2015
- "Green Light", by Hank Thompson, 1954
- "Green Light", by Kylie Minogue from Tension, 2023
- "Green Light", by Lil Durk from Love Songs 4 the Streets 2, 2019
- "Green Light," by Millbrook, 2023
- "Green Light", by R. Kelly from Write Me Back, 2012
- "Green Light", by Sonic Youth from Evol, 1986
- "Greenlight" (Pitbull song), from Climate Change, 2016
- "Greenlight", by 5 Seconds of Summer from 5 Seconds of Summer, 2014
- "Greenlight", by Enisa Nikaj which represented New York in the American Song Contest, 2022
- "Greenlight", by Tate McRae from So Close to What, 2025
- "Green Lights", by Aloe Blacc from Good Things, 2011
- "Green Lights", by NF from Perception, 2017
- "Green Lights", by Sarah Jarosz from Undercurrent, 2016
- "Greenlights" (song), by Krewella

== Computing and technology ==
- Greenlight (Internet service), a fiber-optic Internet service provided by the city of Wilson, North Carolina, US
- Greenlight Networks, a fiber-optic Internet service in Rochester, New York, US
- Steam Greenlight, a service part of Valve's Steam software

== Other uses ==
- Green Light (missile), a precursor to the Sea Cat surface-to-air missile
- Green light (UFO), a type of unidentified flying object
- Green light, a manager giving a player permission to be aggressive; See Glossary of baseball (G)
- Green light, the "Go" indication on a traffic light
- Green light, to order someone's assassination
- Greenlight Collectibles, a diecast manufacturer based in Indiana, United States
- A fictional drug in the TV show Black Lightning
- Europol's Operational Task Force Greenlight in ANOM, an international law enforcement sting operation

== See also ==
- Blue Light (disambiguation)
- Black light (disambiguation)
- Red light (disambiguation)
- Pachai Vilakku (disambiguation) (lit. 'Green Light'), various Indian films
