= Red Lantern =

Red Lantern may refer to:

== Arts and entertainment ==
=== Film ===
- Lentera Merah (Red Lantern), a 2006 Indonesian film
- The Red Lantern, a 1919 American silent film
- The Red Lanterns, a 1963 Greek film

=== Other arts and entertainment ===
- Red Lantern (DC Comics), two characters from DC Comics, unrelated to the Red Lantern Corps
- Red Lantern Corps, a fictional organization in DC comics

== Other uses ==
- Banksia caleyi, or red lantern banksia, an Australian shrub
- Lanterne rouge, the last place holder in the Tour de France
- Red Lanterns (Boxer Uprising), a Chinese fighting group during the Boxer Rebellion
- The traditional lanterns in the Chinese Lantern Festival

== See also ==
- Red light (disambiguation)
