= Walled city of Nanjing =

The Nanjing City (南京城, Nanjing Cheng, literally Nanjing City), or translated as the Walled city of Nanjing, etc., refers to the historical core of Nanjing city enclosed in the Nanjing City Wall built in the early Ming dynasty. The area is about 55 square kilometers. Presently, parts of Qinhuai, Jianye, Gulou and Xuanwu districts of Nanjing are in the enclosed area. Around the City there are waters, rivers or lakes, along with the city wall.

The present Nanjing City Wall was built in Ming dynasty. The Stone City built in 333 BCE in Warring States period is located in the western part of present Nanjing City, and at that time it was the county town of Jinling. The Stone City was rebuilt by Wu during Three Kingdoms, and later the Kingdom of Wu renamed the city Jianye and made it the capital. In Eastern Jin dynasty, the capital city was renamed Jiankang. In Ming dynasty, it renamed Nanking.

The imperial palace site is located in eastern part of the Nankin city. Nanjing Museum is beside it. The observatory site is located on the Qintian Mountain (or Jiming Mountain) in middle north. Gulou Square, lying at the foot of the mountain, is the city center. Not far from Gulou, near the east-west trend ridge from the mountain to Stone Mountain (or Qingliang Mountain), there are many cultural institutions, and also universities and colleges, most of which have added new campuses outside the city in recent years. Xinjiekou, another city center, is a typical central business district, with numerous businesses including various financial firms, stores, restaurants, hotels, entertainment places concentrated there. Several big hospitals are located near Gulou - Xinjiekou area. Presidential Palace is also in the area. The southern area is called Chengnan (城南, the city southern parts), or sometimes called Lao Chengnan (Old Chengnan). Lao Chengnan may also refer to people that have lived in Chengnan for generations and speak old Nankin accent. Many old buildings remain in Chengnan, especially the historical architectures centered on Fuzimiao. Branches of Qinhuai River flow through the city and along the city wall.

Broadly speaking, Nanjing city represents the whole administrative area of Nanjing, including both urban and rural area. Sometimes Nanjing city indicates urban area of Nanjing main city, and in this circumstance generally the term Nanjing Shiqu (南京市區) is used. Nanjing Zhu Chengqu (Nanjing Main City Area, 南京主城區) is a frequently used phrase, which means the enclosed Nanjing City and the urban area around it. Another frequently used phrase, Nanjing Metropolitan Region (Nanjing Dushi Quan, 南京都市圈), includes Nanjing and surrounding cities and areas, with acreage over 60 thousand km^{2} and population over 30 million.

In 2001, 60% urban people of Nanjing, i.e., 1.5 million people lived inside the Nanjing City, just a similar population size of Nanking (Jiankang) in Jin dynasty 1600 years ago. After rapid expanding in recent years, the urban area of Nanjing is more than 1000 km^{2}, near 20 times larger than the Nanjing City. The total administrative area of Nanjing is about 6600 km^{2}.

== See also ==
- Nanjing
- Nanjing City Wall
