= Light Blue =

Light Blue may refer to:

- Light blue, a variant of the color blue
  - Light blue (web color)
  - Light blue (RAL), a RAL color
- "Light Blue", a song by Thelonious Monk on the 1958 jazz album Thelonious in Action
- "Light Blue", a song by Snail Mail on the 2021 indie rock album Valentine
- Light Blue Pour Homme, a men's fragrance
- Light Blue Sun, an album by Lili Haydn
- Light Blue: Arthur Blythe Plays Thelonious Monk, an album by Arthur Blythe
- MRT Light Blue Line, a planned mass rapid transit line to be built in Bangkok, Thailand
- Light Blue Line

== See also ==
- Blue Light (disambiguation)
