= Qinhuai =

Qinhuai can refer to:

- Qinhuai River, a river in Jiangsu, China, which runs through the city of Nanjing
- Qinhuai District, an urban district in Nanjing, China, named after the river
