= Luz Verde =

Luz Verde (meaning "green light" in Spanish) can refer to:

- Luz Verde, a song by Maluma on the 2020 album Papi Juancho
- Luz Verde, a political party in Spain

== See also ==
- Green light (disambiguation)
