= Jiulong Bridge =

Jiulong Bridge 九龙桥
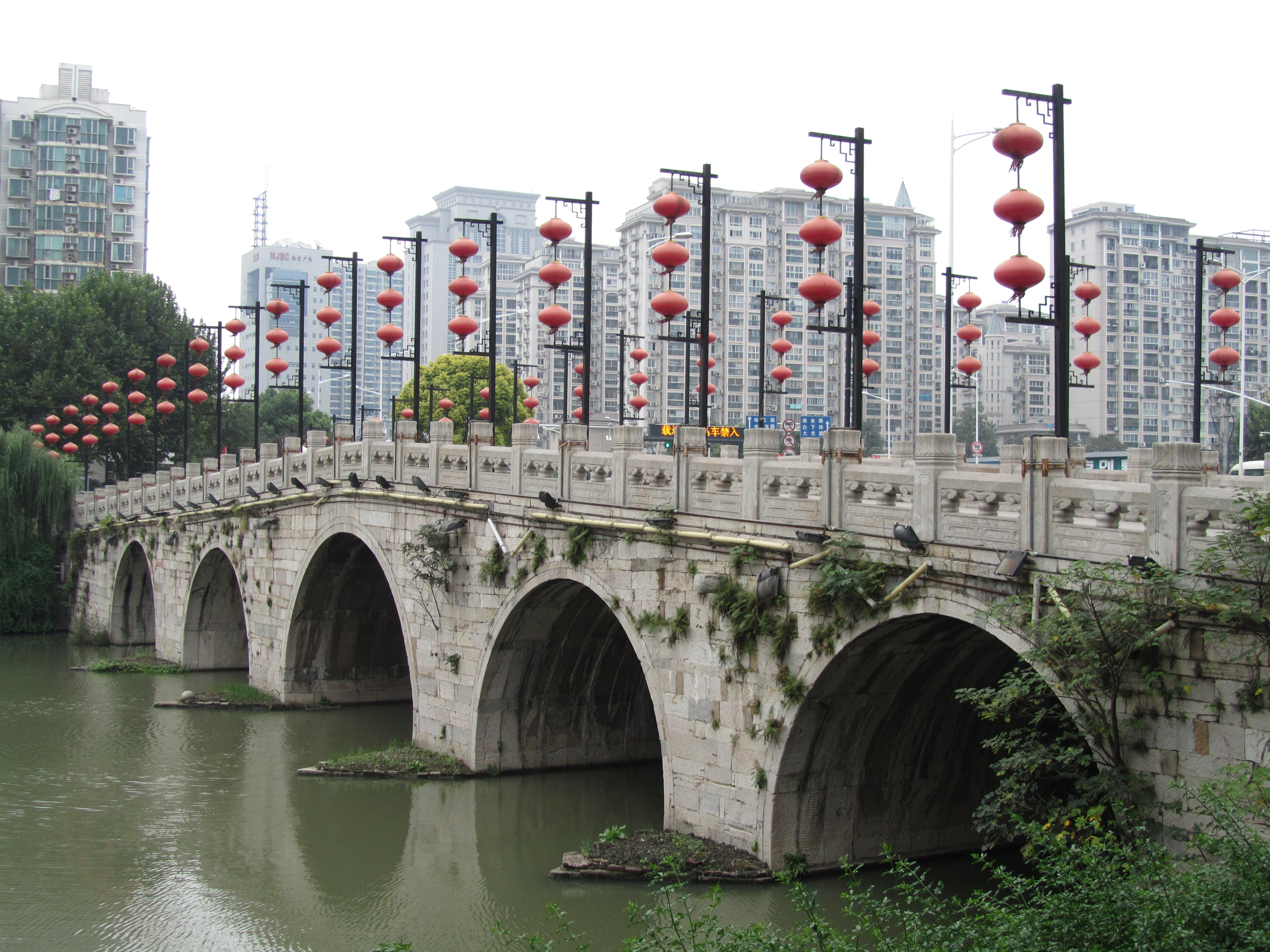
- Nine Dragons Bridge in October 2011
- Coordinates: 32°01′47″N 118°48′24″E
- Carries: Pedestrians and bicycles
- Crosses: Qinhuai River
- Locale: Qinhuai District, Nanjing, Jiangsu, China

Characteristics
- Design: Arch bridge
- Material: Stone
- Total length: 51 metres (167 ft)
- Width: 12.4 metres (41 ft)
- Height: 5.7 metres (19 ft)

History
- Rebuilt: 1884

The Jiulong Bridge (simplified Chinese: 九龙桥; traditional Chinese: 九龍橋; pinyin: Jiǔlóng Qiáo; lit. 'Nine Dragons Bridge') is a historic stone arch bridge over the Qinhuai River in Qinhuai District, Nanjing, Jiangsu, China.

== History ==
Originally built in the early Ming dynasty (1368–1644), the bridge also known as "Tongji Bridge" (通济桥) because of its proximity to Tongji Gate. The present version was completed in 1884 during the ruling of Guangxu Emperor of the Qing dynasty (1644–1911).

In 1937, a section of the bridge was bombed by Japanese fighters during the Second Sino-Japanese War. After the founding of the Communist State in 1949, it was restored, and cement bridge fences were added and pavement was paved. In June 2006, it has been designated as a municipal cultural heritage conservation unit by the Government of Nanjing.
