= Blue Lanterns =

Blue Lantern(s) may refer to:

- Uninitiated members of a triad
- Blue Lantern (short story collection), a 1991 book by Victor Pelevin
  - "Blue Lantern" (short story), the title story
- Blue Lantern Corps, a fictional organization in DC Comics
- The Blue Lantern, a 1918 German silent film
- Checks by the Directorate of Defense Trade Controls for high-risk exports

== See also ==
- Blue Light (disambiguation)
