= Nanjing Fuzimiao =

Confucius temple in Nanjing

- 南京夫子庙 (Chinese)
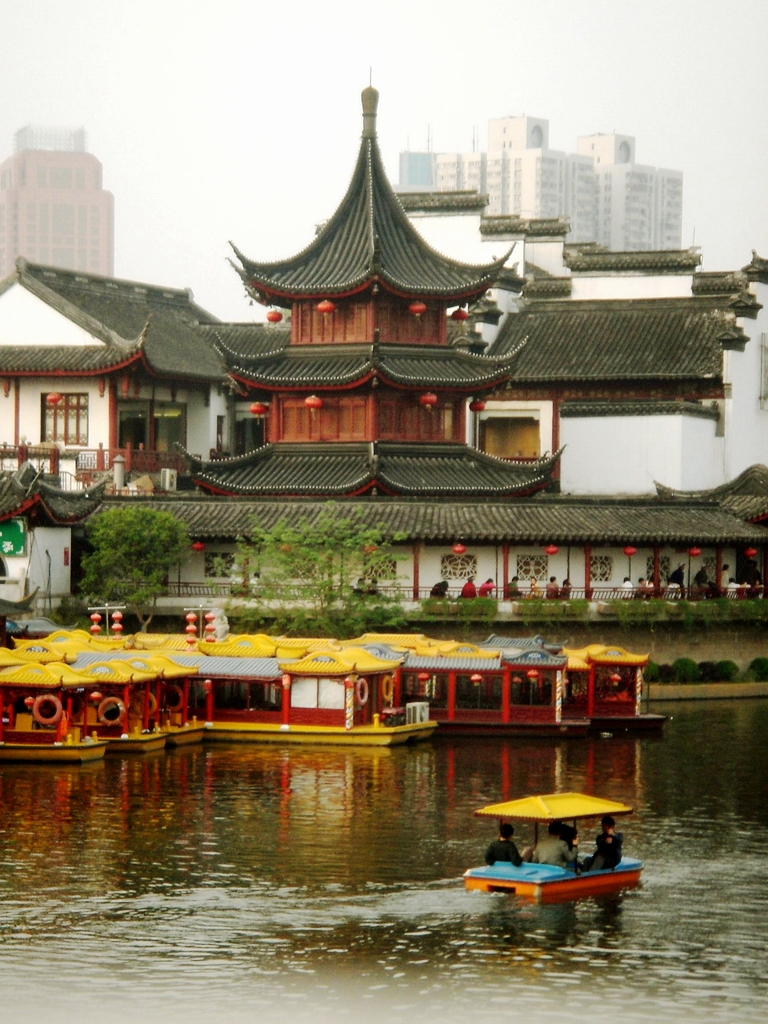
- Kuiguang/Kuixing Pavilion (魁光阁/魁星阁)
- Interactive map of Nanjing Fuzimiao
- 32.022579°N 118.783786°E
- Location: 128 Zinyhan Road, Nanjing, China

History
- Built: 1034 originally A.D.; the current structure was built in the 19th century

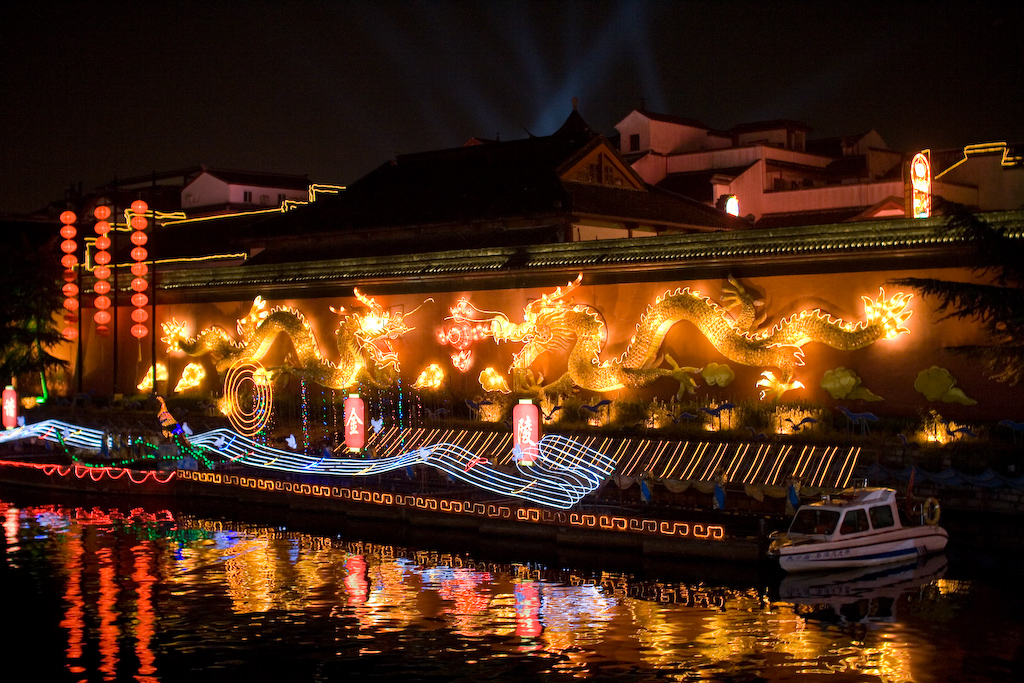
Night scene of Fuzimiao

Nanjing Fuzimiao (Chinese: 南京夫子庙) or Fuzimiao (Chinese: 夫子庙; lit. 'Confucian Temple'), is a Confucius Temple and former site of imperial examination hall located in southern Nanjing City on banks of the Qinhuai River. It is now a popular tourist attraction with pedestrian shopping streets around the restored temple buildings.

Nanjing Confucius Temple is located in Qinhuai District, Nanjing City, on the north bank of the Qinhuai River Gongyuan Street, Jiangnan Gongyuan west, located in the Confucius temple Qinhuai scenery belt core area, namely Nanjing Confucius Temple, Nanjing Confucian Temple, Wenxuanwang Temple, for the place of worship and sacrifice of Confucius. It is the first national highest institution of learning in China, one of the four major temples of literature in China, the hub of ancient Chinese culture, the place where Nanking history and humanities gather and is not only the cultural and educational centre of Nanjing in the Ming and Qing dynasties but also the cultural and educational architectural complex that ranks first in the southeastern provinces.

== History ==
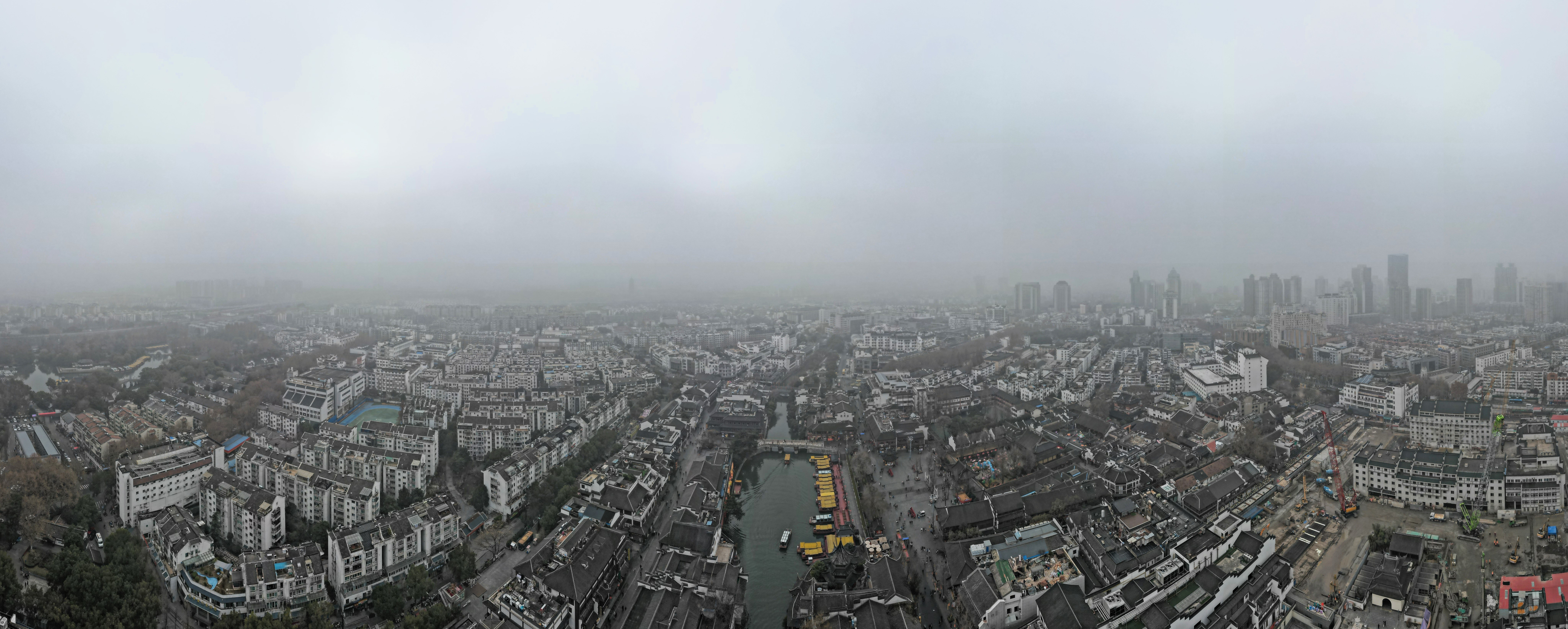
Aerial panorama of Nanjing South and the Qinhuai River where Fuzimiao is located. December 2023.

In first year of Jianwu reign of the Jin dynasty (CE 317), Nanking Imperial University was founded, initially on northern bank of Qinhuai River, and in the third year of Xiankang (CE 337) the campus extended to southern bank. Temple of Confucius was firstly constructed in the national school in the ninth year of Taiyuan (CE 384). The place was later destroyed. It was destroyed by fire during the Jianyan years of the Southern Song dynasty. In the first year of Jingyou during the Song dynasty (CE 1034), Confucius Temple was newly constructed on former site of imperial university, and was called Fuzimiao area along with Nanking Fuxue. The place became Imperial University again in 1365 in the early year of the Ming dynasty, and sixteen years later recovered to be the campus of Fuxue. During the Qing dynasty, there were two Xianxue (county schools of Shangyuan and Jiangning) in Fuzimiao area. In the end of Qing a primary school jointly sponsored by counties of Nanjing (Jiangning Fu) was established there. The current buildings date from the 19th century, in the Qing dynasty, with additions made since then. The temple lost all financial support by the state as a result of the revolution of 1911. During the late 1920s to 1931 and again in 1932 it was used as army barracks for troops the KMT regime and left in a dilapidated state. Some halls were used as picture gallery. In 1985 Fuzimiao area was restored.

There is Jiangnan Gongyuan near Fuzimiao Temple. It's the largest imperial examination hall in Ming and Qing dynasties.

Throughout its history, the temple along with the around area has been a place for study of Confucianism. There is a small exhibit of folkart within the temple.

It was a place to worship and consecrate Confucius, the great philosopher and educator of ancient China.

== Tourism ==
Nanjing Fuzimiao was officially approved as the first 5A open-style scenic spot of China in 2010 and also obtained high reputation and influence in tourism for home and abroad. The temple can be visited throughout the year. However, in the summer, temple is usually more crowded with tourists. Although the winter months are particularly cold, people can attend a notable festival during the first month of the lunar year called Qinhuai Lantern Fair.

== Cruise ==
Qinhuai River flows through Fuzimiao. Visitors can take painted boats to cruise on the Qinhuai River. There are 50 to 60 original village sites that have been found on the banks. Other attractions include historical sites, gardens, painted boats, streets and folk customs. Boats can be taken at different wharfs along the river (there is Panchi Wharf, located in front of Dacheng Hall of Confucius Temple, Wuding Gate Wharf, Wharf of Kuixing Ge, and Stone City Wharf). Chinese traditional music is performed on the boats.

== Gallery ==
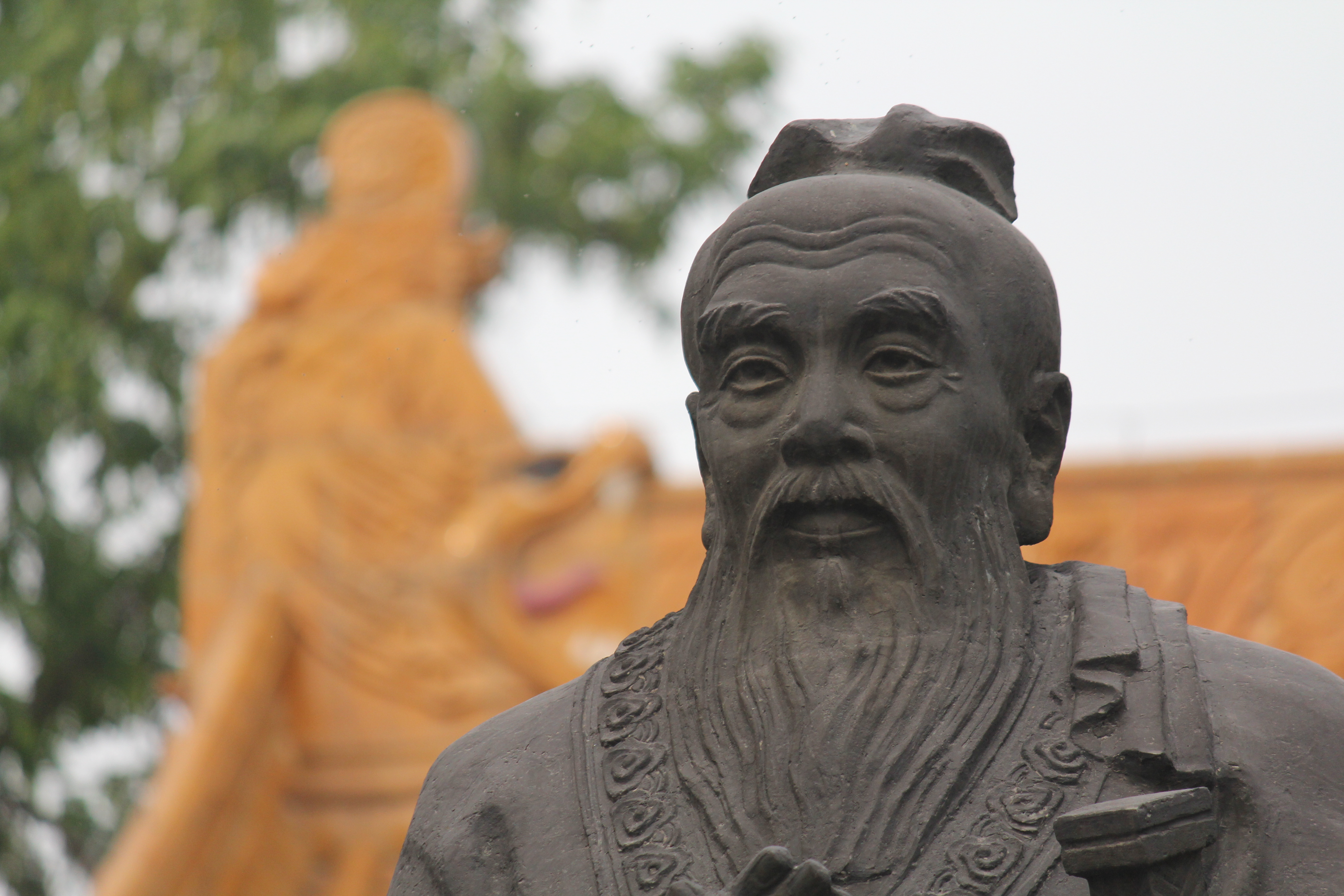
Confucius sculpture

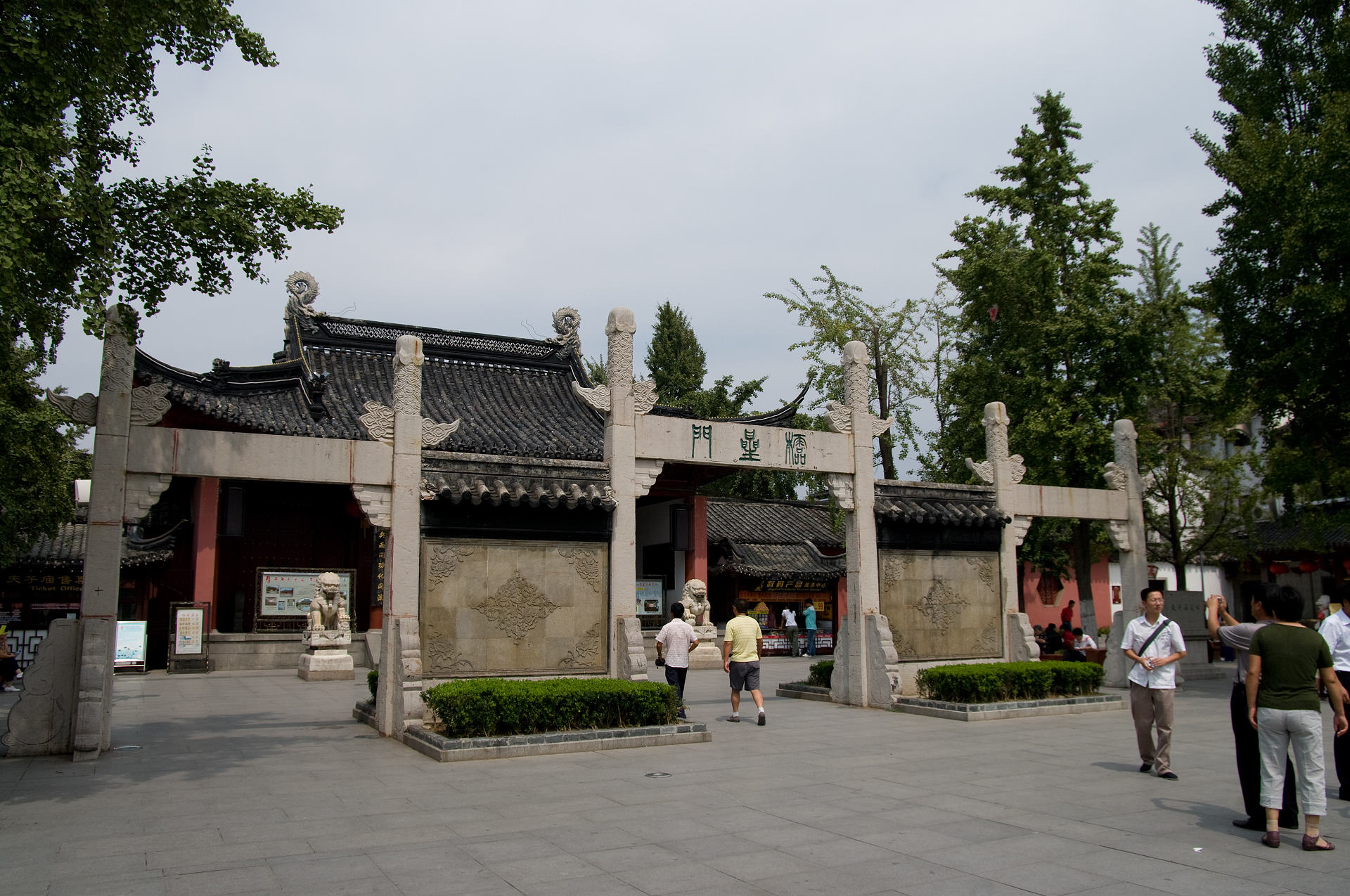
Lingxing Gate (棂星门)

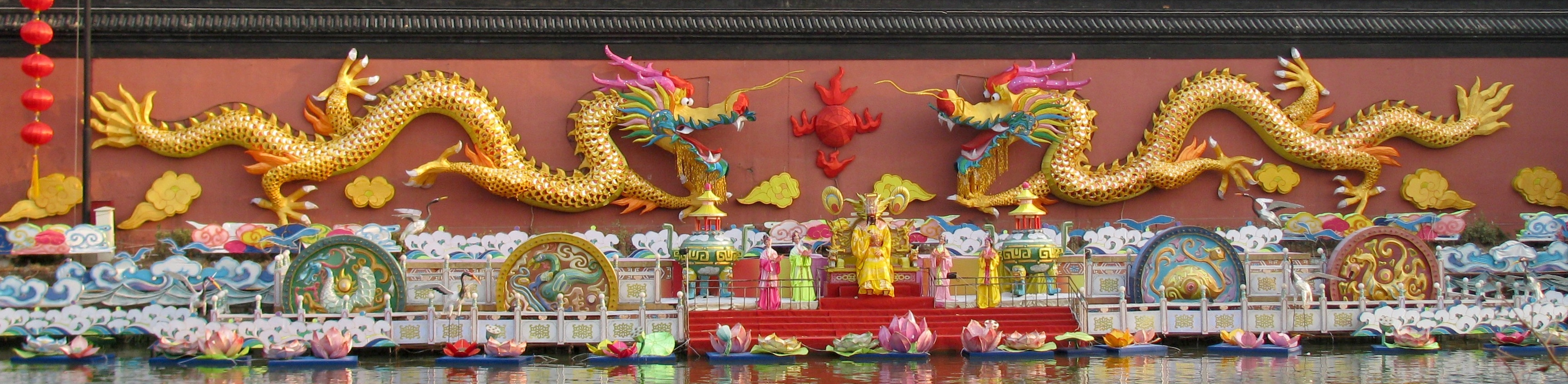
Great Spirit Screen (大照壁) decorated with dragons

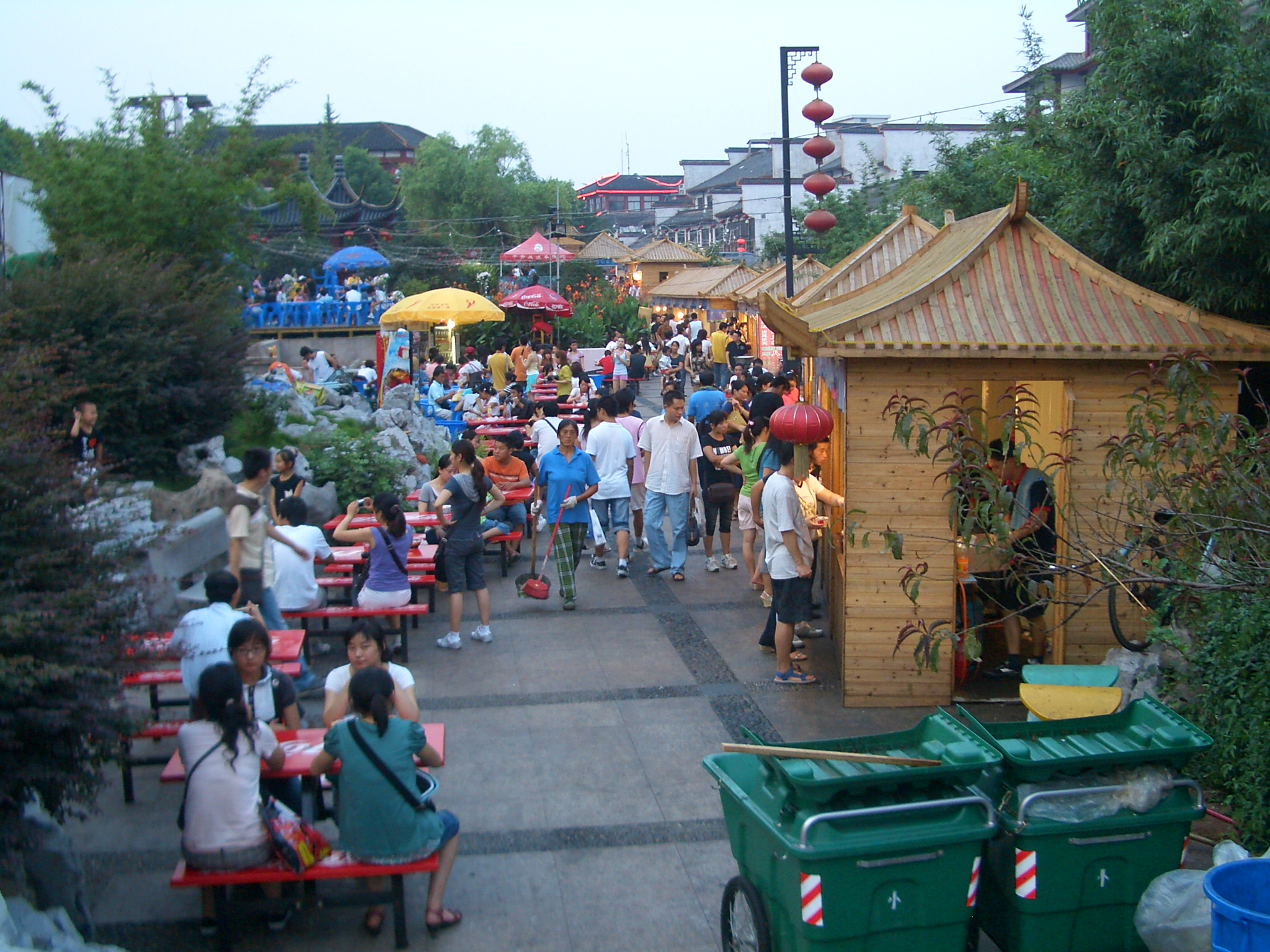
Streetview north of Zhonghua Gate

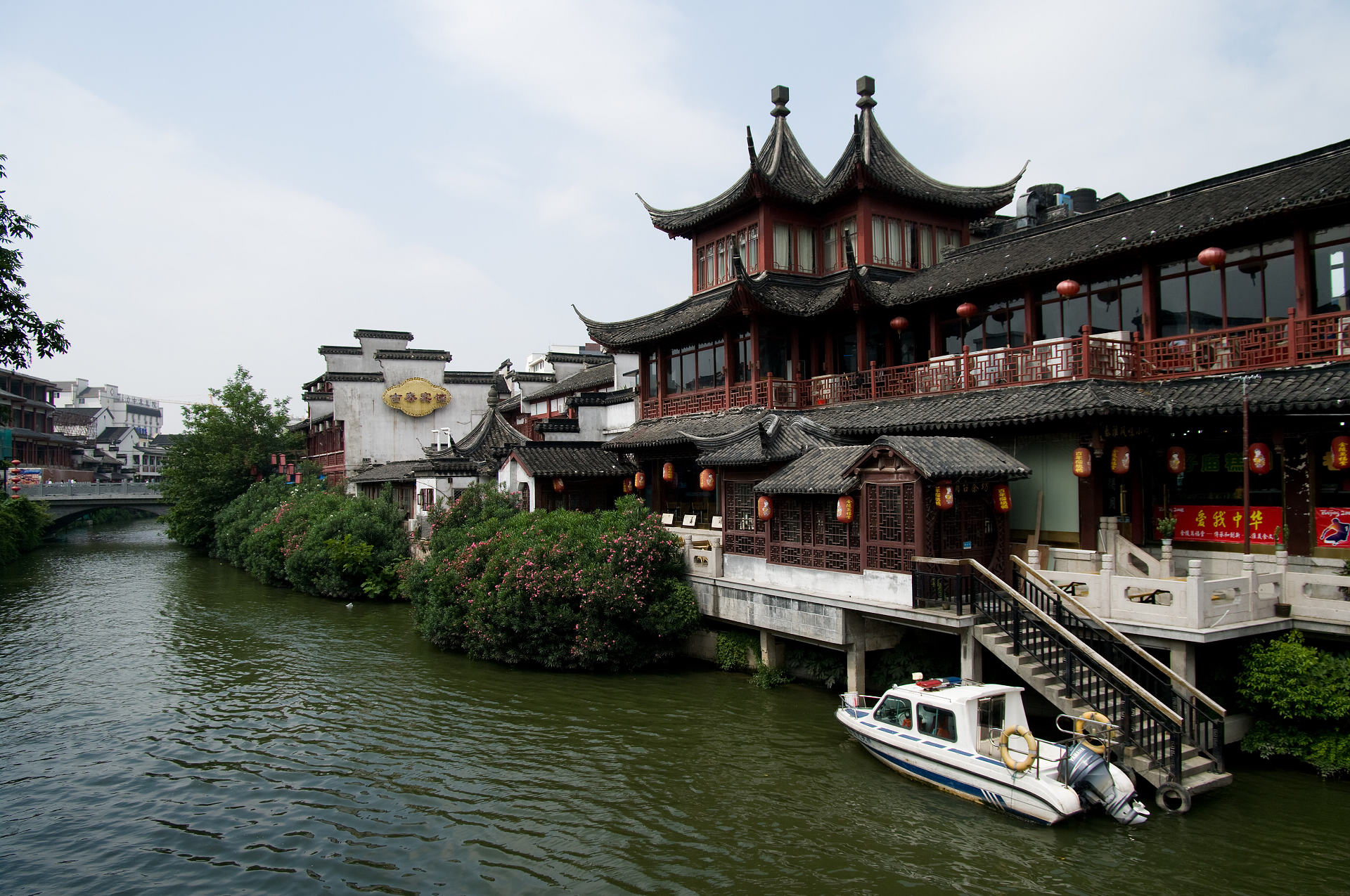
Riverside near Fuzi Miao

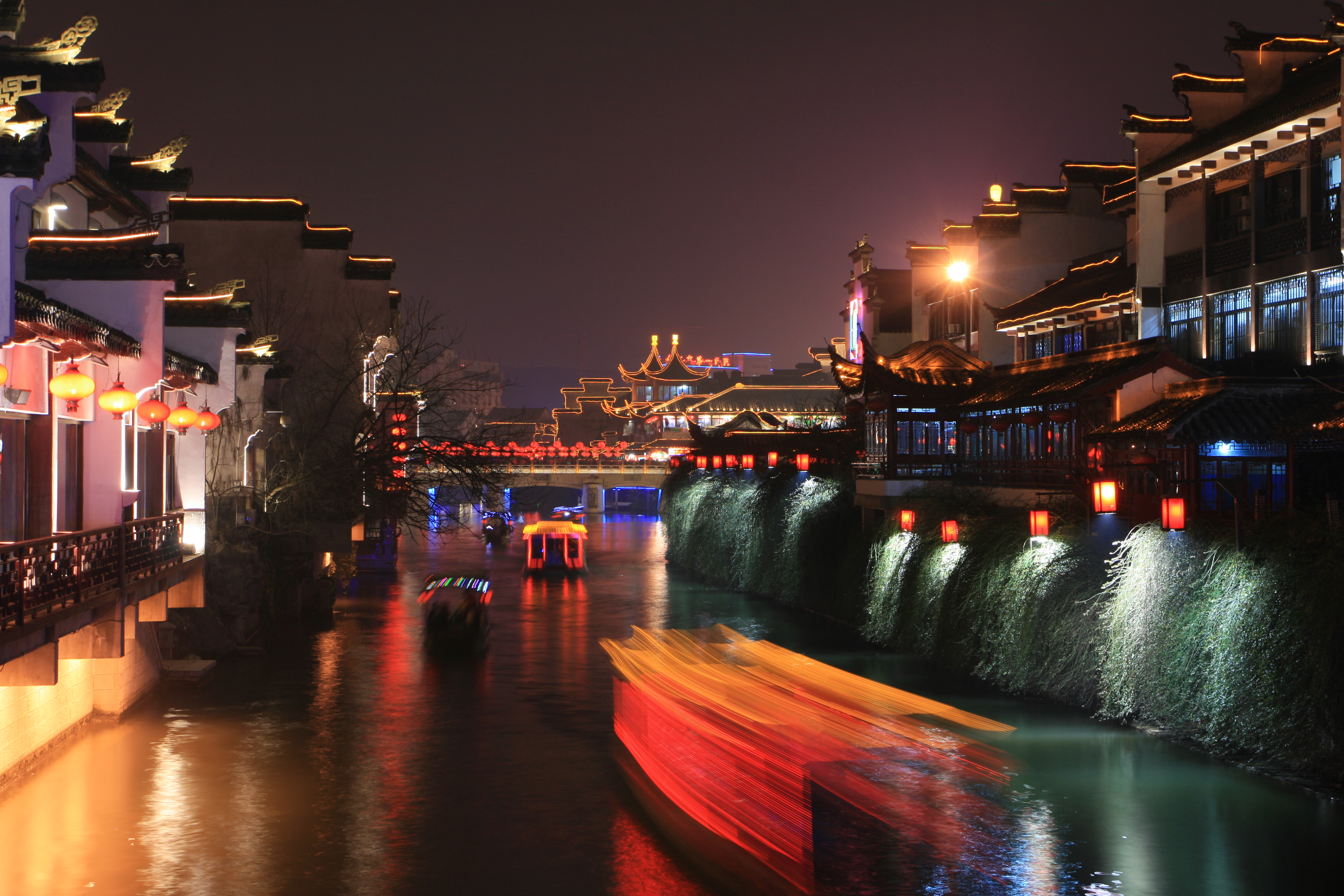
Night view of Qinhuai River and Fuzimiao

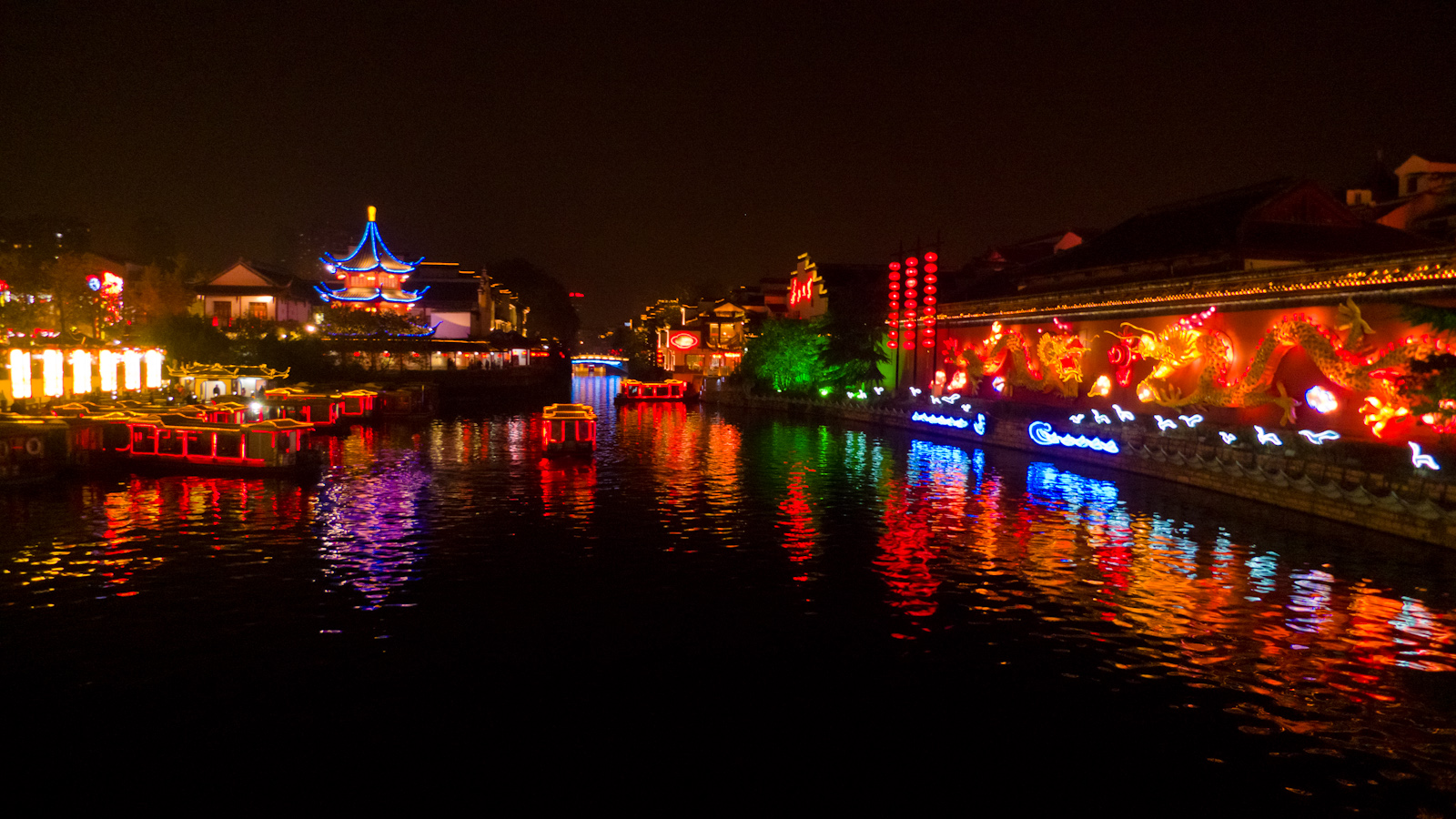
Another night view of Qinhuai River and Fuzimiao, where both Kuiguang Pavilion and Great Spirit Screen (on the opposite riverside of each other) can be seen
