= Qinhuai Lantern Fair =

- Chinese: 秦淮灯会
Transcriptions
Standard Mandarin
- Hanyu Pinyin: Qínhuái dēnghuì

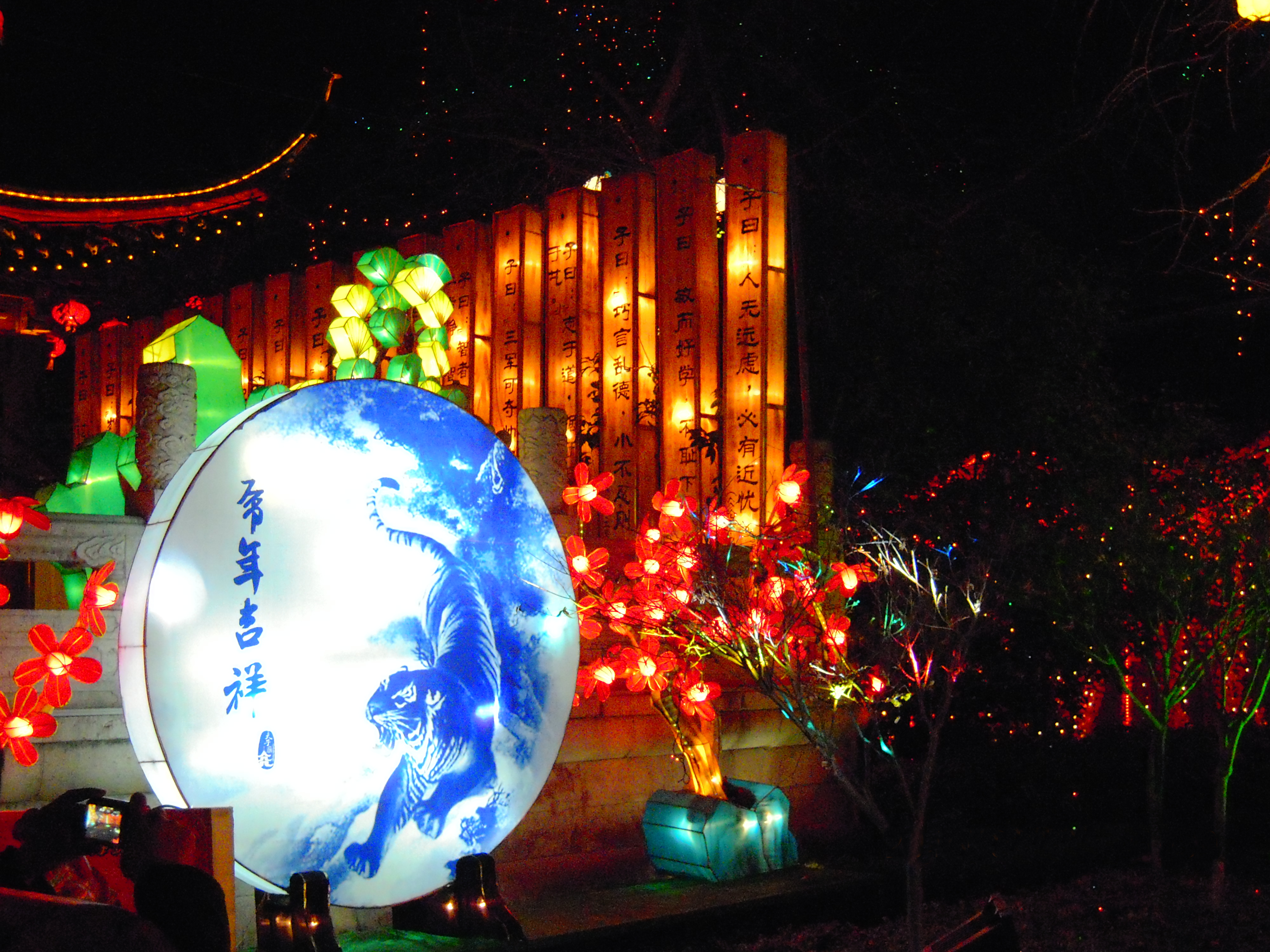
Lanterns during the Qinhuai Lantern Fair

The Qinhuai Lantern Fair, also known as Jinling Lantern Fair, Jinling Lantern Festival, and officially named Lantern Fair on Qinhuai River, is a popular folk custom celebration of the Lantern Festival in the Nanjing area.

Modern usage refers to the large-scale fair held yearly at the Confucius Temple of Nanjing between the Spring Festival and Lantern Festival. There have been 25 fairs held up to date, and it is one of the most famous celebrations of the Lantern Festival in China. On the day of the Lantern Festival, the fair reaches its climax. An old Nanjing saying, "If you don't see the New Year lanterns at Confucius Temple, you have not celebrated the new year; if you go to Confucius Temple but don't buy a lantern, you haven't celebrated the new year properly", demonstrates the popularity of this fair. On June 2, 2006, the fair was named as one of the Intangible Cultural Heritage of China by the government of the People's Republic of China.

== History ==
=== Early fairs ===
The origin of the fairs can be traced back to Eastern Wu. During that time, the act of hanging lanterns was used in festivals and celebrations. When armies returned in triumph, government officials and civilians would gather to hang up lanterns around the city to welcome them home. Back then, embroidery techniques were passed into Eastern Wu from Shu Han, which stimulated the growth of the textile industry in the region and provided the basis for lantern manufacturing. Nanjing (then Jinling) was the capital during Eastern Jin and Southern dynasties. Many nobles and members of the gentry lived on the banks of the Qinhuai River. When the Lantern Festival came, these people would hang up lanterns and decorations, mimicking the Palace. During the reign of Emperor Xiaowu of Liu Song, the development of paper technologies resulted in low prices of paper, which made it a replacement for many textiles and contributed to the development of colored lanterns.

From the Sui on, hanging lanterns during the Lantern Festival became a tradition. By the Tang dynasty, lantern fairs during the Lantern Festival became a regular practice. This time saw an increase in the scale of the festival as well as the number of days from one day on the Lantern Festival to three days between fourteenth and sixteenth of the first month of the lunar calendar. Curfew restrictions were relaxed on these days. The festivals were very fancy, and many professional lantern artisans set up shops on the banks of the Qinhuai River.

During the Northern Song dynasty, the number of nights for hanging lanterns increased to a total of five, adding the seventeenth and eighteenth of the first month. The tradition of writing "lantern riddles" on lanterns was also formed. In 1243, the thirteenth of the first month was also added to the festival, which increased the duration to six nights.

=== Fairs in Ming, Qing, and Republic of China era ===
After establishing the Ming dynasty, the Hongwu Emperor made Nanjing his capital. To create an ambiance of prosperity, he actively supported the holding of the Lantern Festival. Afterward, the duration of the festival was increased to ten nights, making it the longest lantern festival in Chinese history. Every year, the Hongwu Emperor spent large amounts of money, material, and manpower in order to produce a substantial number of lanterns to draw people to the lantern fair.

After the Manchu people entered into China proper and established the Qing dynasty, they continued and developed the local tradition. The classic Dream of the Red Chamber describes the bustling view of lanterns. Every year during the Lantern Festival, hordes of people gathered in the vicinity of the Confucius Temple with gongs and drums making ear-piercing noises; the liveliness surpassed even the celebrations in the Ming dynasty.

In 1864, the Xiang Army sieged and took Nanking, destroying much of the infrastructure in the process. This greatly hampered the traditions of the Lantern Festival in Nanking. Tseng Kuo-fan attempted to have celebrations reach their former glory by dredging the Qinhuai River and rebuilding the Confucius Temple in 1865. His efforts brought in a recovery of the tradition.

At that time, businessmen from Huizhou enjoyed their fame in lantern making. Soldiers of the Xiang Army encamped in Nanking at that time also were adapt at making lanterns, which also contributed to the wide variety of lanterns. During the Republic of China era, the area around the Confucius Temple was known for its lantern markets. However, owing to perennial civil warfare, lantern fairs frequently suffered. In 1937, the invading Imperial Japanese Army occupied Nanking, causing great damage to the Confucius Temple. Lantern fairs were suspended due to warfare once more. It was not until after 1939 that a small number of lantern merchants would occasionally be in the vicinity of the Confucius Temple. After 1945, due to the hyperinflation caused by the Chinese Civil War, regular civilians did not have the ability to put on such celebrations, and the tradition of lantern fairs nearly disappeared.

=== Fairs in the People's Republic of China ===
After the establishment of the People's Republic of China in 1949, the fairs began to be revived slowly. In the 1960s, the fair had more or less reached its former scale. After the start of the Cultural Revolution in 1966, folk arts such as traditional lanterns were seen as part of the Four Olds. Thus, the lantern market and fairs became prohibited. In 1977, the lantern market around the Confucius Temple opened for the first time after the Cultural Revolution. In 1984, the government appropriated funds for the repair of the Confucius Temple as well as the surrounding landscapes. In 1985, the government of Qinhuai District in Nanjing started holding officially sponsored fairs during Spring Festival and Lantern Festival time around the Confucius Temple. In 1984, the Qinhuai Lantern Crafts Association was formed, and many civilian craftsmen started making lanterns with modern techniques. In 1988, a museum of lantern arts was built in the Confucius Temple, which brought the appearance of large-scale sets of lanterns in the fairs.

== Lantern Art ==
The production of Qinhuai lanterns integrates traditional Chinese handicrafts such as weaving, painting, calligraphy, paper cutting, shadow puppetry, embroidery, sculpture and so on. As far as its production materials are concerned, the materials for making skeletons are mainly bamboo, trees, rattan, wheat straw, animal horns, and metals, among others. The materials that make up the light source vary from the use of pine resin, animal and vegetable oil, lacquer, paraffin, kerosene and other fuels, with bamboo, grass, cotton cores, etc. as the wick, to the use of electric light sources. Its surface translucent materials have also developed with the development of the times, including various colors of translucent paper, silk veil, painting yarn, cotton, as well as synthetic silk forging, plastic film, special glass and so on. Its production process has integrated a series of process techniques and production methods such as carpentry, lacquer, painting, carving, clay sculpture, knotting, mounting paste, welding, mechanical transmission, sound and light sound, electronic program control, etc. From a historical point of view, from the traditional single lamps such as lotus lamps, lion lamps, rabbit lamps, goldfish lamps, toad lamps, yuanbao lamps, to a variety of combination lights, large flower lanterns, and with the progress of the times, including ocean-going ships, carrier rockets and reflect the urban construction, mountain landscape of various lights, its categories have reached more than 400 kinds. In addition to the display of illuminations, the Qinhuai Lantern Festival also includes other folk culture and art categories in Nanjing, such as Nanjing paper-cutting, empty bamboo, knots, carving, shadow puppetry, animal dance, song, trembling, stilt walking, etc.

== Current fairs ==
Since 2007, the Fuzi temple scenic area has worked on a large-scale transformation and upgrading, the inner and outer Qinhuai River water system has been integrated, opening up a new Qinhuai river cruise route. In 2009, the Qinhuai Lantern Fair introduced large-scale lanterns from Zigong, Sichuan province, and for the first time, light-colored art was mainly held. In 2010, in cooperation with Taiwan tourism agencies in the name of the Jiangsu lantern festival, Taiwan lanterns were displayed and sent to participate in the Chiayi lantern festival for lantern exchange activities. In 2011, for the first time, the first Ming Wall International Light Festival named, invited the United States, Japan, Korea, Singapore, Malaysia and other foreign lanterns to participate in the exhibition.

In 2017, during the lantern festival, the Qinhuai Lantern Fair set a record of more than 600,000 tourists visited.
