= Bluelight =

Bluelight may refer to:

- Billy Bluelight (1859–1949), English boat racer
- Bluelight!, a novel series
- Bluelight (web forum), a web forum dedicated to harm reduction

== See also ==
- Blue Light (disambiguation)
