= Pachai Vilakku =

Pachai Vilakku (transl. Green Light) may refer to these Indian Tamil-language films:

- Pachhai Vilakku (1964 film)
- Pachai Vilakku (2020 film)

== See also ==
- Green Light (disambiguation)
