= The Green Light (film) =

1964 film by Villen Azarov

- Russian: Зелёный огонёк
- Directed by: Villen Azarov
- Written by: Valentina Spirina
- Starring: Aleksei Kuznetsov; Svetlana Savyolova; Anatoliy Papanov; Tatyana Bestayeva; Ivan Ryzhov
- Cinematography: Viktor Listopadov
- Edited by: L. Lysenkova
- Music by: Aleksandr Flyarkovsky
- Release date: 1964
- Running time: 74 minutes
- Country: Soviet Union
- Language: Russian

The Green Light (Russian: Зелёный огонёк, romanized: Zelyoniy ogonyok) is a 1964 Soviet comedy film directed by Villen Azarov. The film tells about the good-natured taxi driver Sergey and his first trip around the city of Moscow on an old dilapidated Moskvitch during which he helps people out. (The green light on a taxi of the time used to indicate that it is vacant.)

== Cast ==
- Aleksei Kuznetsov as Sergey Kuznetsov
- Svetlana Savyolova as Ira Savyolova
- Anatoliy Papanov as Boris Zhmurkin (as A. Papanov)
- Tatyana Bestayeva as Lena (as T. Bestayeva)
- Ivan Ryzhov as Vasiliy Stepanovich (as I. Ryzhov)
- Vsevolod Sanaev as Pensioner (as V. Saneyev)
- Vladimir Rautbart as Gruzin (as V. Rautbart)
- Vyacheslav Nevinnyy as Vikharyev (as V. Nevinnyy)
