= Lantern Festival =

Last day of Chinese New Year celebrations

Lantern Festival 元宵節 / 元宵节
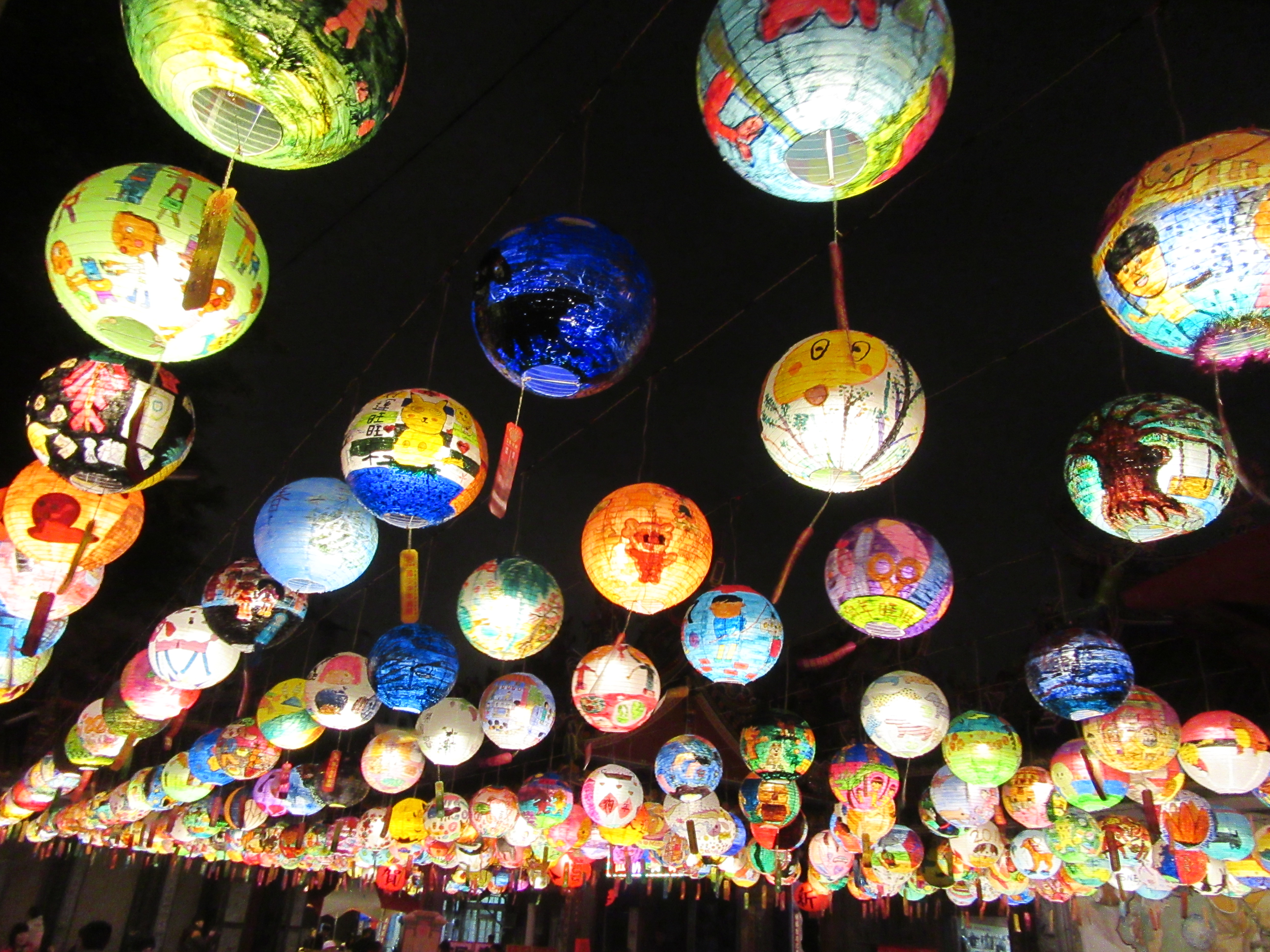
- Lantern Festival celebrated in Tainan at night
- Observed by: Chinese
- Type: Cultural, Religious
- Significance: Marks the end of the Chinese New Year
- Observances: Flying of paper lanterns; consumption of tangyuan
- Date: 15th day of the 1st lunisolar month
- 2025 date: 12 February
- 2026 date: 3 March
- 2027 date: 20 February
- Related to: Chotrul Duchen (in Tibet); Daeboreum (in Korea); Koshōgatsu (in Japan); Māgha Pūjā (in Thailand, Sri Lanka, Myanmar, Cambodia and Laos); Tết Nguyên Tiêu (in Vietnam)

Lantern Festival
- Traditional Chinese: 元宵節
- Simplified Chinese: 元宵节
- Literal meaning: "Prime Night Festival"
Transcriptions
Standard Mandarin
- Hanyu Pinyin: Yuánxiāo jié
- Wade–Giles: Yüan^{2}-hsiao^{1} chieh^{2}
- IPA: [ɥɛ̌n.ɕjáʊ tɕjě]
Wu
- Romanization: Nyioe siau tsih
Yue: Cantonese
- Yale Romanization: Yùhnsīu jit
- Jyutping: Jyun^{4} siu^{1} zit^{3}
- IPA: [jyn˩ siw˥ tsit̚˧]
Southern Min
- Hokkien POJ: Goân-siau-chiat
- Tâi-lô: Guân-siau-tsiat
Eastern Min
- Fuzhou BUC: Nguòng-siĕu-cáik

Hokkien name
- Traditional Chinese: 十五暝 / 上元
- Literal meaning: "15th Night" / "Top Primary"
Transcriptions
Southern Min
- Hokkien POJ: Cha̍p-gō͘-mê / Siōng-goân
- Tâi-lô: Tsa̍p-gōo-mê / Siōng-guân

Second alternative Chinese name
- Traditional Chinese: 上元節
- Simplified Chinese: 上元节
- Literal meaning: first great [Emperor-Officials] festival
Transcriptions
Standard Mandarin
- Hanyu Pinyin: Shàngyuánjié

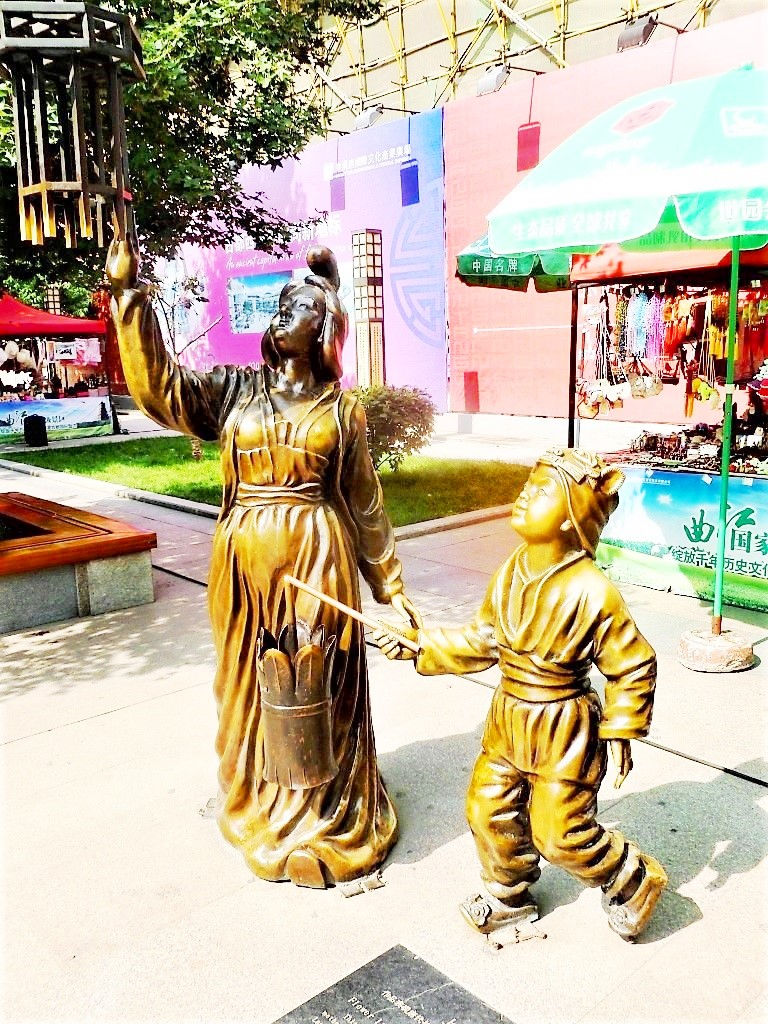
Statues of mother and daughter celebrating the Lantern Festival. Xi'an, Shaanxi province

The Lantern Festival (traditional Chinese: 元宵節; simplified Chinese: 元宵节; pinyin: Yuánxiāo jié), also called the Shangyuan Festival or the Yuanxiao Festival, is a Chinese traditional festival celebrated on the fifteenth day of the first month in the lunisolar Chinese calendar, during the full moon. Usually falling in February or early March on the Gregorian calendar, it marks the final day of the traditional Chinese New Year celebrations. As early as the Western Han dynasty (206 BC–AD 25), it had become a festival with great significance.

During the Lantern Festival, children go out at night carrying paper lanterns and solving riddles written on them (traditional Chinese: 猜燈謎; simplified Chinese: 猜灯谜; pinyin: cāidēngmí). In ancient times, lanterns were fairly simple, and only the emperor and noblemen had large, ornate ones. In modern times, lanterns have been embellished with intricate designs. For example, lanterns are now often made in the shape of animals. The lanterns can symbolize the people letting go of their past selves and getting new ones, which they will let go of the next year. The lanterns are almost always red to symbolize good fortune.

The festival acts as an Uposatha day on the Chinese calendar. It should not be confused with the Mid-Autumn Festival, which is sometimes also known as the "Lantern Festival" in locations such as Indonesia, Malaysia, and Singapore. Lantern Festivals have also become popular in Western countries, such as the Water Lantern Festival held in multiple locations in the United States.

== Origin ==
There are several beliefs about the origin of the Lantern Festival. However, its roots trace back more than 2,000 years and is popularly linked to the reign of Emperor Wen of the Han dynasty. Emperor Ming, an advocate of Buddhism, noticed Buddhist monks would light lanterns in temples on the fifteenth day of the first lunisolar month. As a result, he ordered all households, temples and the imperial palace to light lanterns on that evening. From there it developed into a folk custom. Another likely origin is the celebration of "the declining darkness of winter" and community's ability to "move about at night with human-made light," namely, lanterns. During the Han dynasty, the festival was connected to Ti Yin, the deity of the North Star.

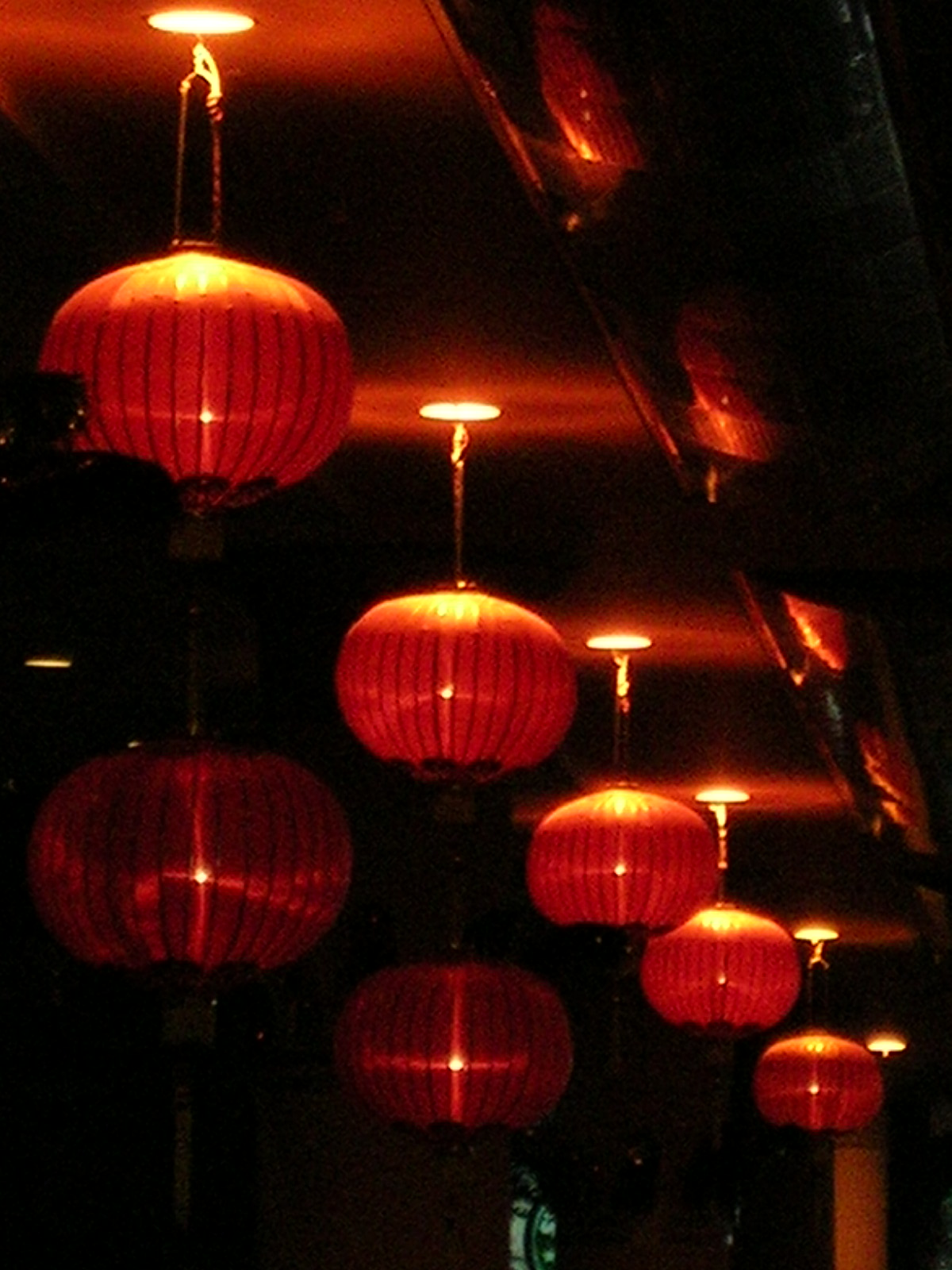
Red lanterns, often seen during the festivities in China

There is one legend that states that it was a time to worship Taiyi, the God of Heaven in ancient times. The belief was that Taiyi controlled the destiny of the human world. He had sixteen dragons at his beck and call and he decided when to inflict drought, storms, famine or pestilence upon human beings. Beginning with Qin Shi Huang, the first emperor of China, all the emperors ordered splendid ceremonies each year. The emperor would ask Taiyi to bring favorable weather and good health to him and his people.

Emperor Wu of the Han dynasty directed special attention to this event. In 104 BC, he proclaimed it to be one of the most important celebrations and the ceremony would last throughout the night.

Another legend associates the Lantern Festival with Taoism. Tianguan is the Taoist deity responsible for good fortune. His birthday falls on the fifteenth day of the first lunisolar month. It is said that Tianguan likes all types of entertainment, so followers prepare various kinds of activities during which they pray for good fortune.

Another legend associates with the Lantern Festival with an ancient warrior named Lan Moon, who led a rebellion against the tyrannical king in ancient China. He was killed in the storming of the city and the successful rebels commemorated the festival in his name.

Yet another common legend dealing with the origins of the Lantern Festival speaks of a beautiful crane that flew down to earth from heaven. After it landed on earth it was hunted and killed by some villagers. This angered the Jade Emperor in heaven because the crane was his favorite. So, he planned a storm of fire to destroy the village on the fifteenth lunisolar day. The Jade Emperor's daughter warned the inhabitants of her father's plan to destroy their village. The village was in turmoil because nobody knew how they could escape their imminent destruction. However, a wise man from another village suggested that every family should hang red lanterns around their houses, set up bonfires on the streets, and explode firecrackers on the fourteenth, fifteenth, and sixteenth lunisolar days. This would give the village the appearance of being on fire to the Jade Emperor. On the fifteenth lunisolar day, troops sent down from heaven whose mission was to destroy the village saw that the village was already ablaze, and returned to heaven to report to the Jade Emperor. Satisfied, the Jade Emperor decided not to burn down the village. From that day on, people celebrate the anniversary on the fifteenth lunisolar day every year by carrying lanterns on the streets and exploding firecrackers and fireworks.

Another legend about the origins of Lantern Festival involves a maid named Yuan-Xiao. In the Han dynasty, Dongfang Shuo was a favorite adviser of the emperor. One winter day, he went to the garden and heard a little girl crying and getting ready to jump into a well to commit suicide. Shuo stopped her and asked why. She said she was Yuan-Xiao, a maid in the emperor's palace and that she never had a chance to see her family since she started working there. If she could not have the chance to show her filial piety in this life, she would rather die. Shuo promised to find a way to reunite her with her family. Shuo left the palace and set up a fortune-telling stall on the street. Due to his reputation, many people asked for their fortunes to be told but everyone got the same prediction – a calamitous fire on the fifteenth lunisolar day. The rumor spread quickly.

Everyone was worried about the future so they asked Dongfang Shuo for help. Dongfang Shuo said that on the thirteenth lunisolar day, the God of Fire would send a fairy in red riding a black horse to burn down the city. When people saw the fairy they should ask for her mercy. On that day, Yuan-Xiao pretended to be the red fairy. When people asked for her help, she said that she had a copy of a decree from the God of Fire that should be taken to the emperor. After she left, people went to the palace to show the emperor the decree which stated that the capital city would burn down on the fifteenth. When the emperor asked Dongfang Shuo for advice, the latter said that the God of Fire liked to eat tangyuan (sweet dumplings). Yuan-Xiao should cook tangyuan on the fifteenth lunisolar day and the emperor should order every house to prepare tangyuan to worship the God of Fire at the same time. Also, every house in the city should hang red lantern and explode fire crackers. Lastly, everyone in the palace and people outside the city should carry their lanterns on the street to watch the lantern decorations and fireworks. The Jade Emperor would be deceived and everyone would avoid the disastrous fire.

The emperor happily followed the plan. Lanterns were everywhere in the capital city on the night of the fifteenth lunisolar day and people were walking on the street and there were noisy firecrackers. It looked as if the entire city was on fire. Yuan-Xiao's parents went into the palace to watch the lantern decorations and were reunited with their daughter. The emperor decreed that people should do the same thing every year. Since Yuan-Xiao cooked the best tangyuan, people called the day Yuan-Xiao Festival.

For each festival celebrated, a switch in the Chinese Zodiac takes place. For example, 2022—the year of the tiger; 2023—the year of the rabbit (water rabbit); and so on.

== Tradition ==
=== Finding love ===
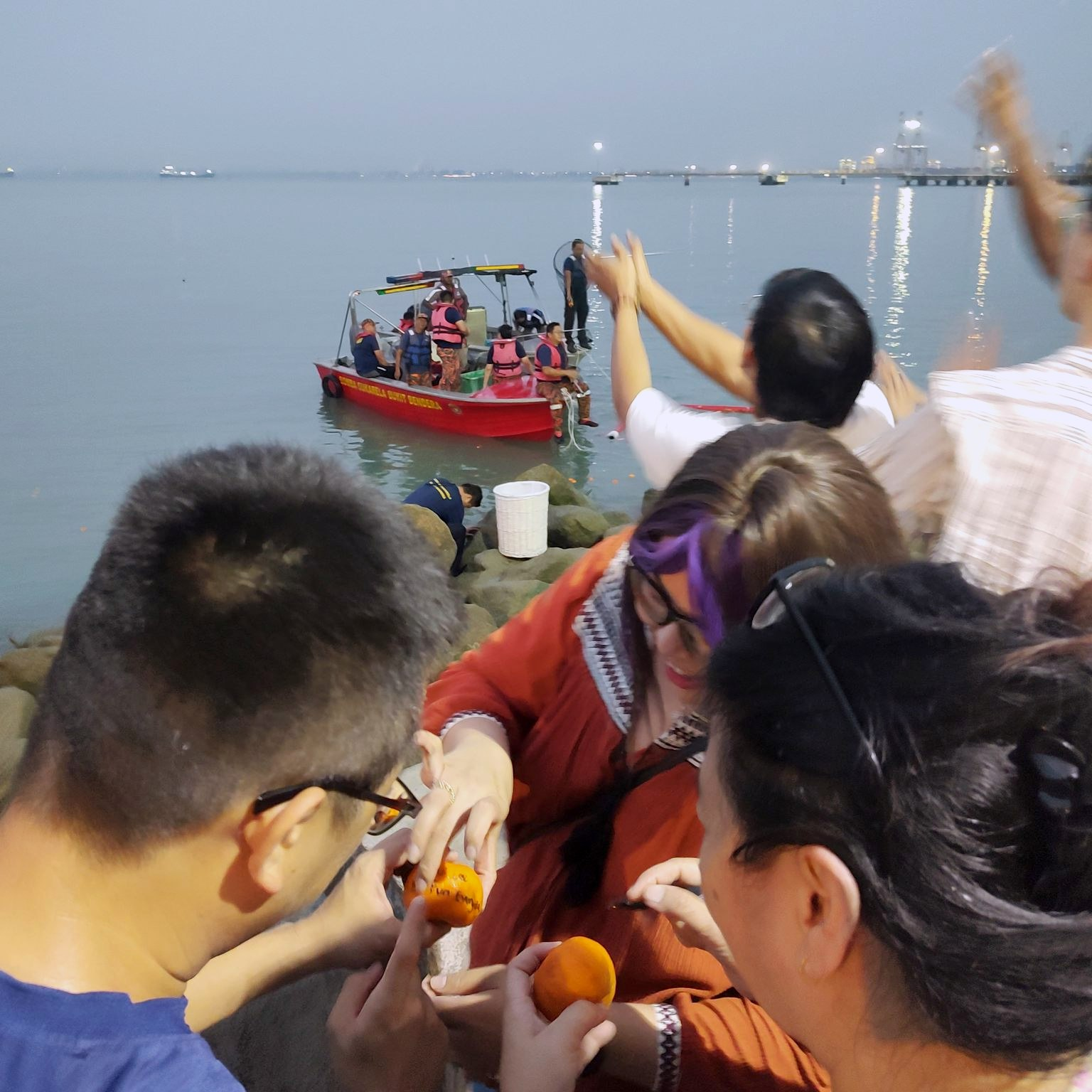
Annotating oranges to be tossed into the sea at the Esplanade, Penang

In Chinese culture, the festival is often considered the traditional Chinese Valentine's Day. Historically, it was one of the few times young women were allowed to leave their homes to admire lanterns, providing a rare opportunity for them to meet and interact with potential suitors. Matchmakers acted busily in hopes of pairing couples. The brightest lanterns were symbolic of good luck and hope. As time has passed, the festival no longer has such implications in most of mainland China, Taiwan, or Hong Kong.

In Malaysia and Singapore, some unmarried women write their names and contact details on mandarin oranges. The oranges are then thrown into lakes or rivers in the hope that they are retrieved by a potential suitor.

=== Tangyuan or Yuanxiao ===
Eaten during the Lantern Festival, tangyuan '湯圓' (Southern China, Taiwan and Southeast Asia) or yuanxiao '元宵' (Northern China) is a glutinous rice ball typically filled with sweet red bean paste, sesame paste, or peanut butter. Tangyuan is different from yuanxiao due to different manual making and filling processes. However, they are very similar in shape and taste, so most people do not distinguish them for convenience and consider them as the same thing. Chinese people believe that the round shape of the balls and the bowls in which they are served symbolize family togetherness, and that eating tangyuan or yuanxiao may bring the family harmony, happiness and luck in the new year.

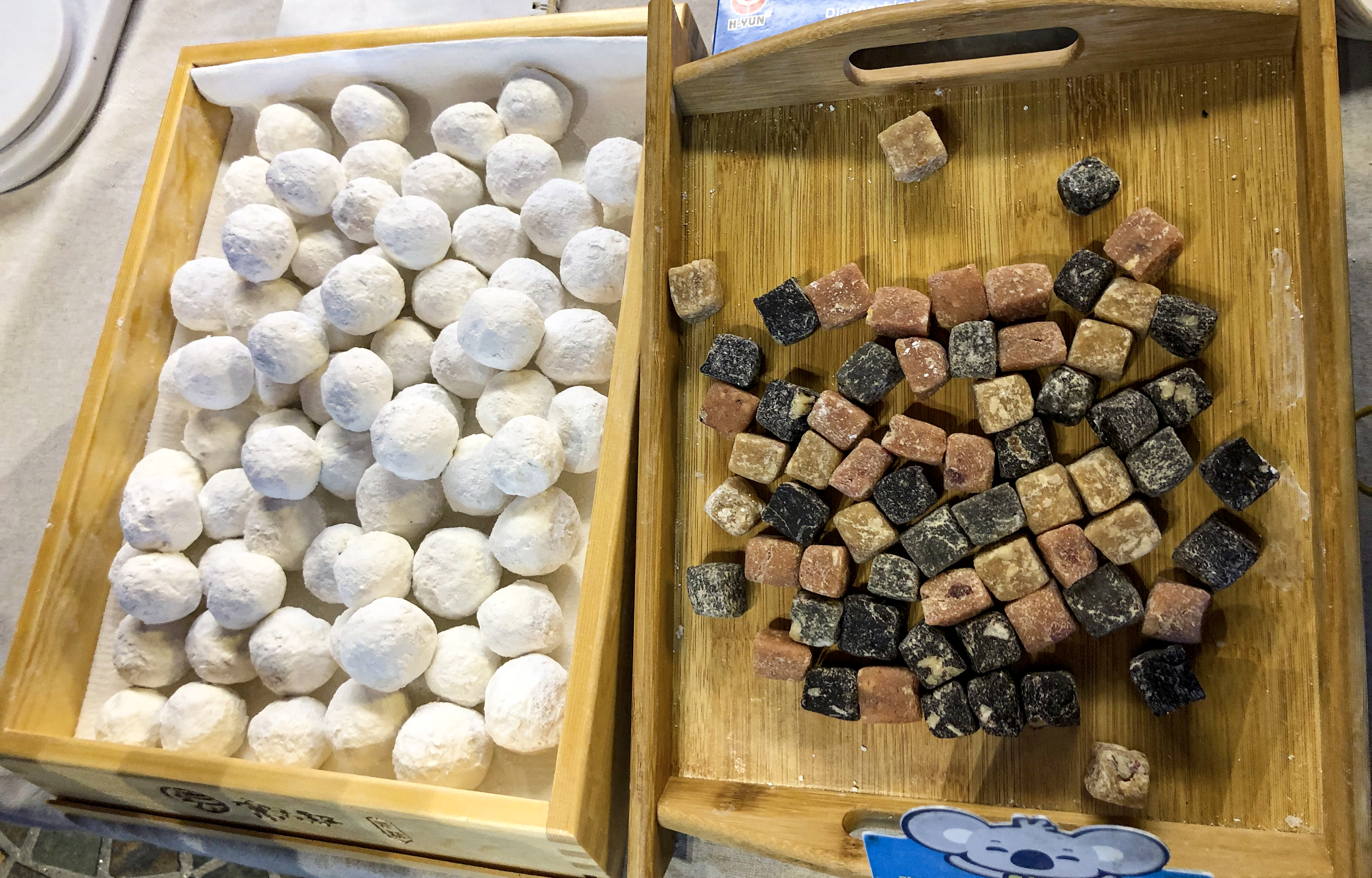
Yuanxiao and its fillings

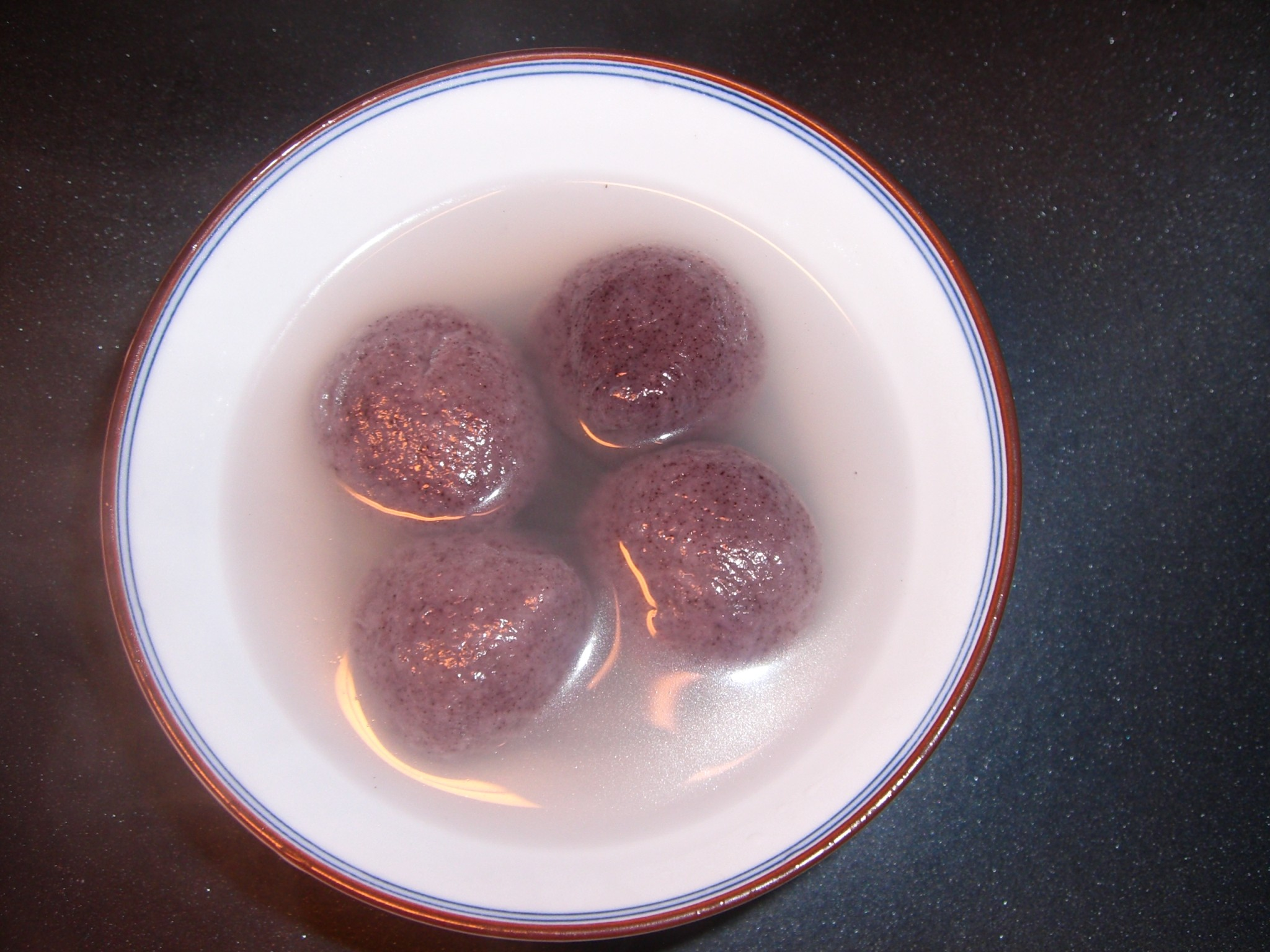
Yuanxiao

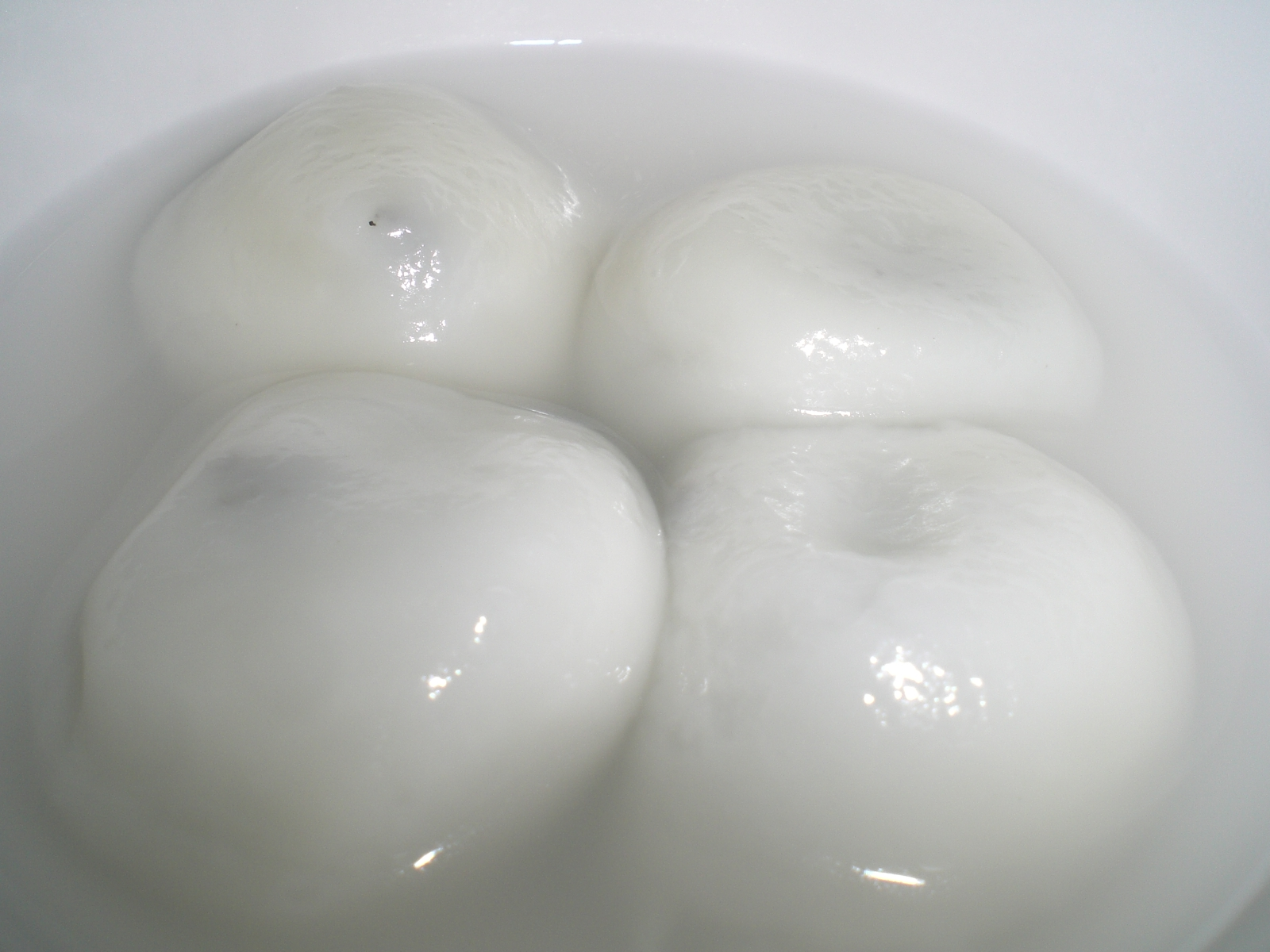
Yuanxiao

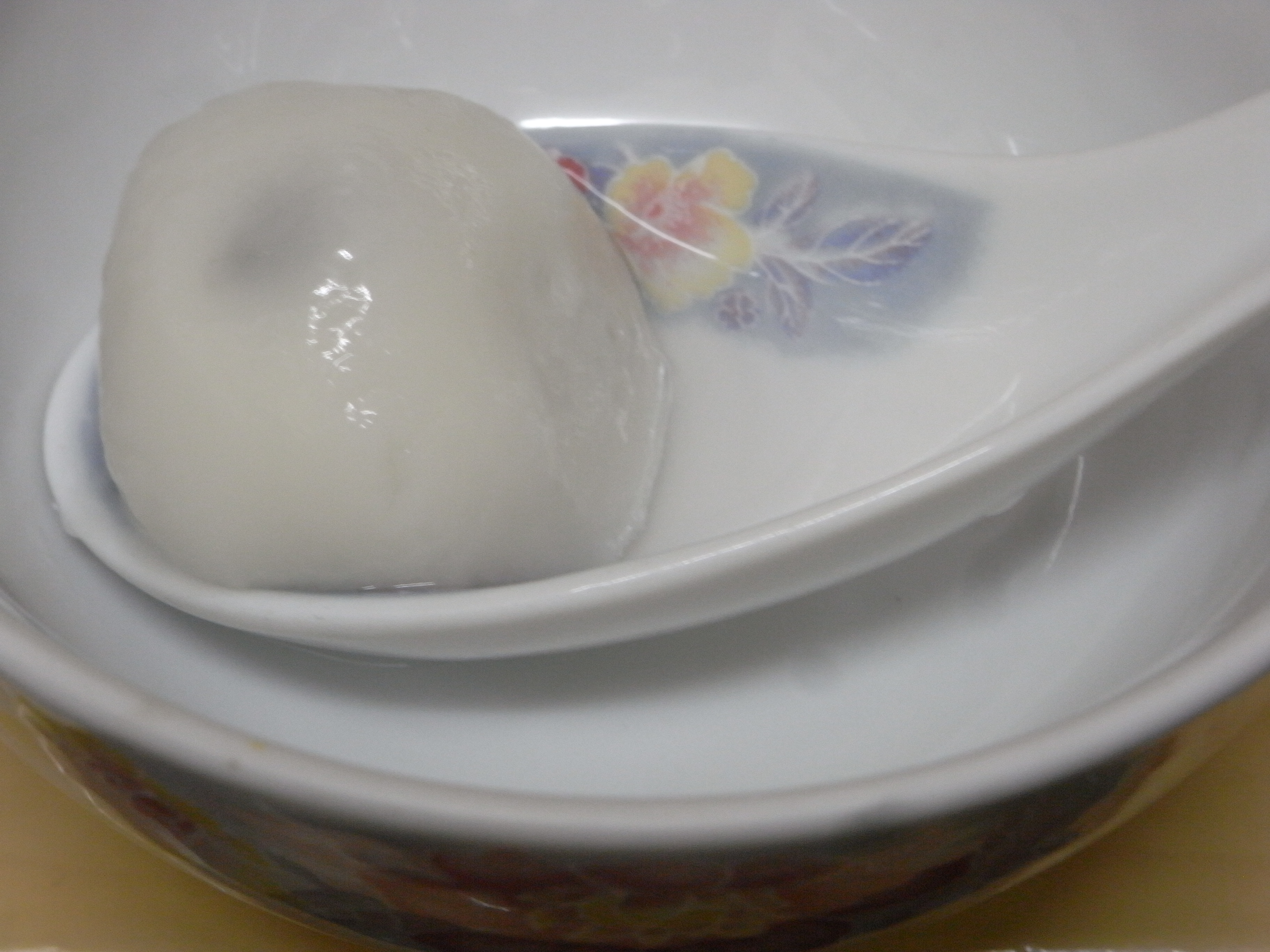
Yuanxiao

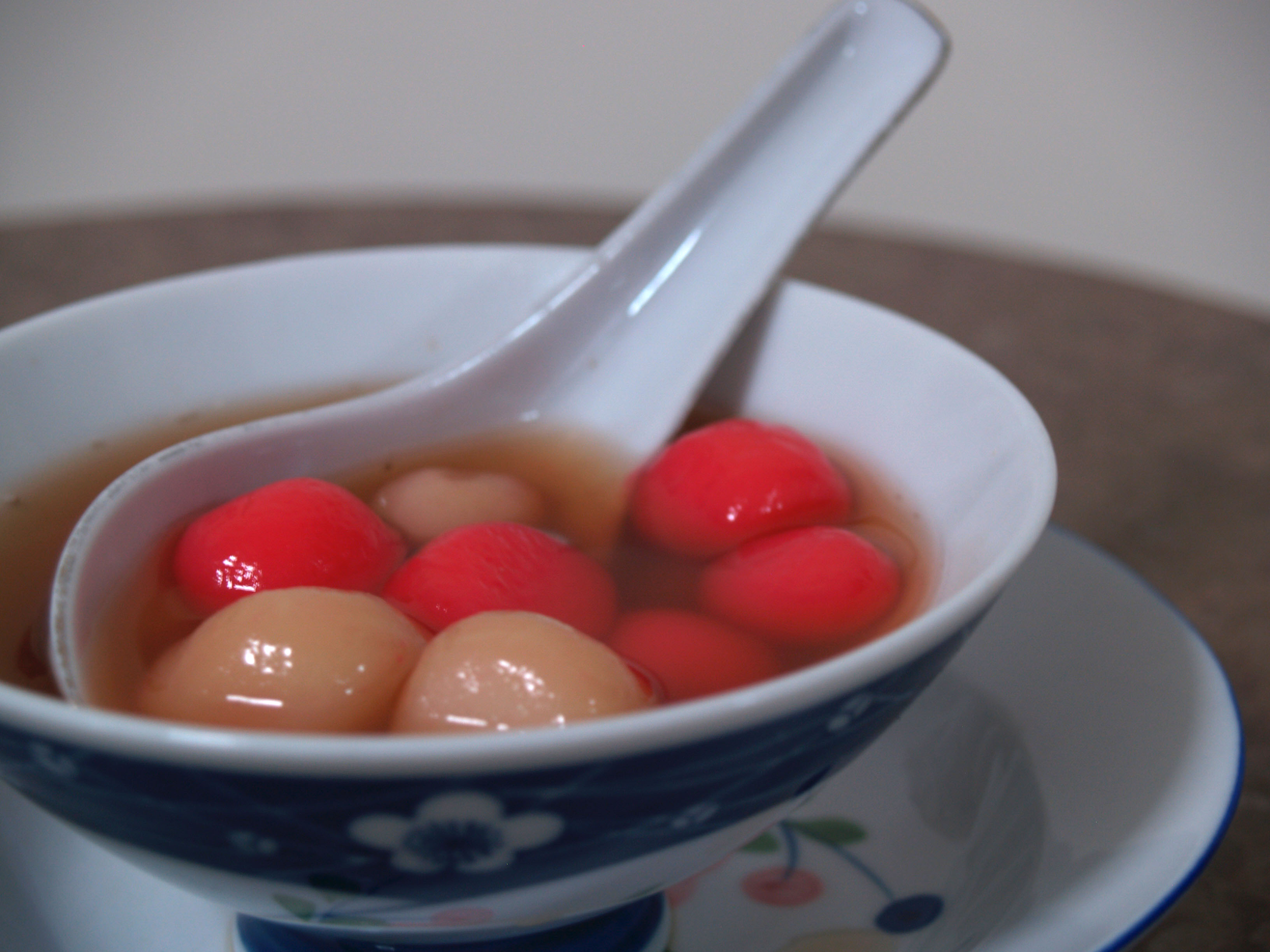
Tangyuan

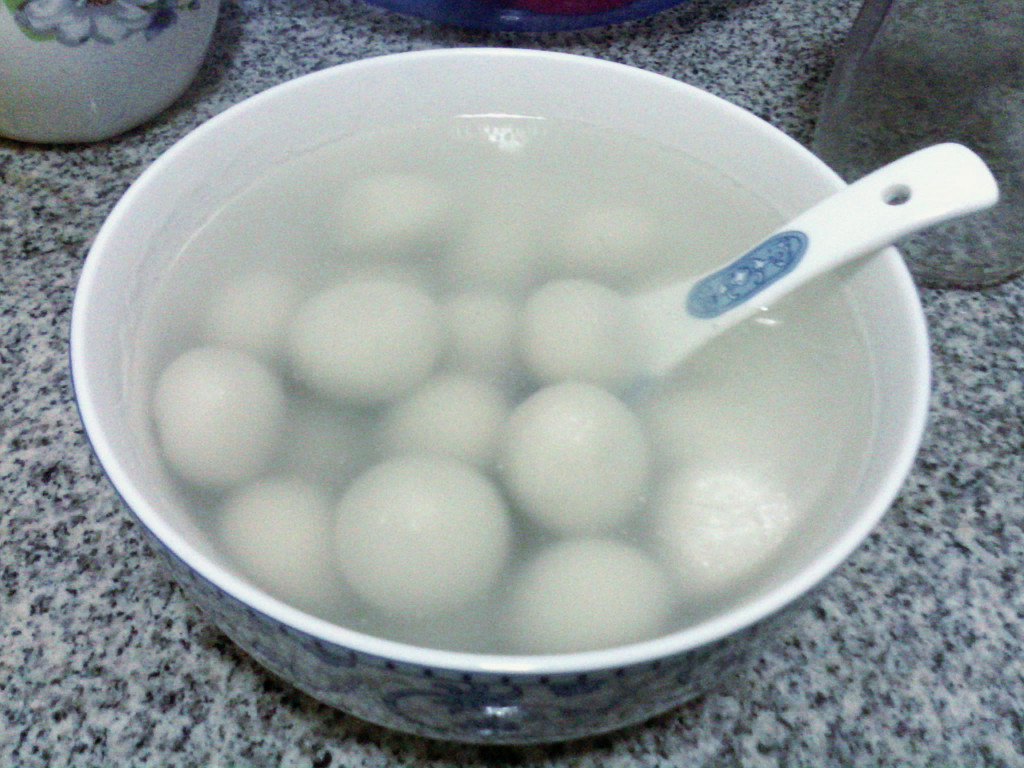
Tangyuan

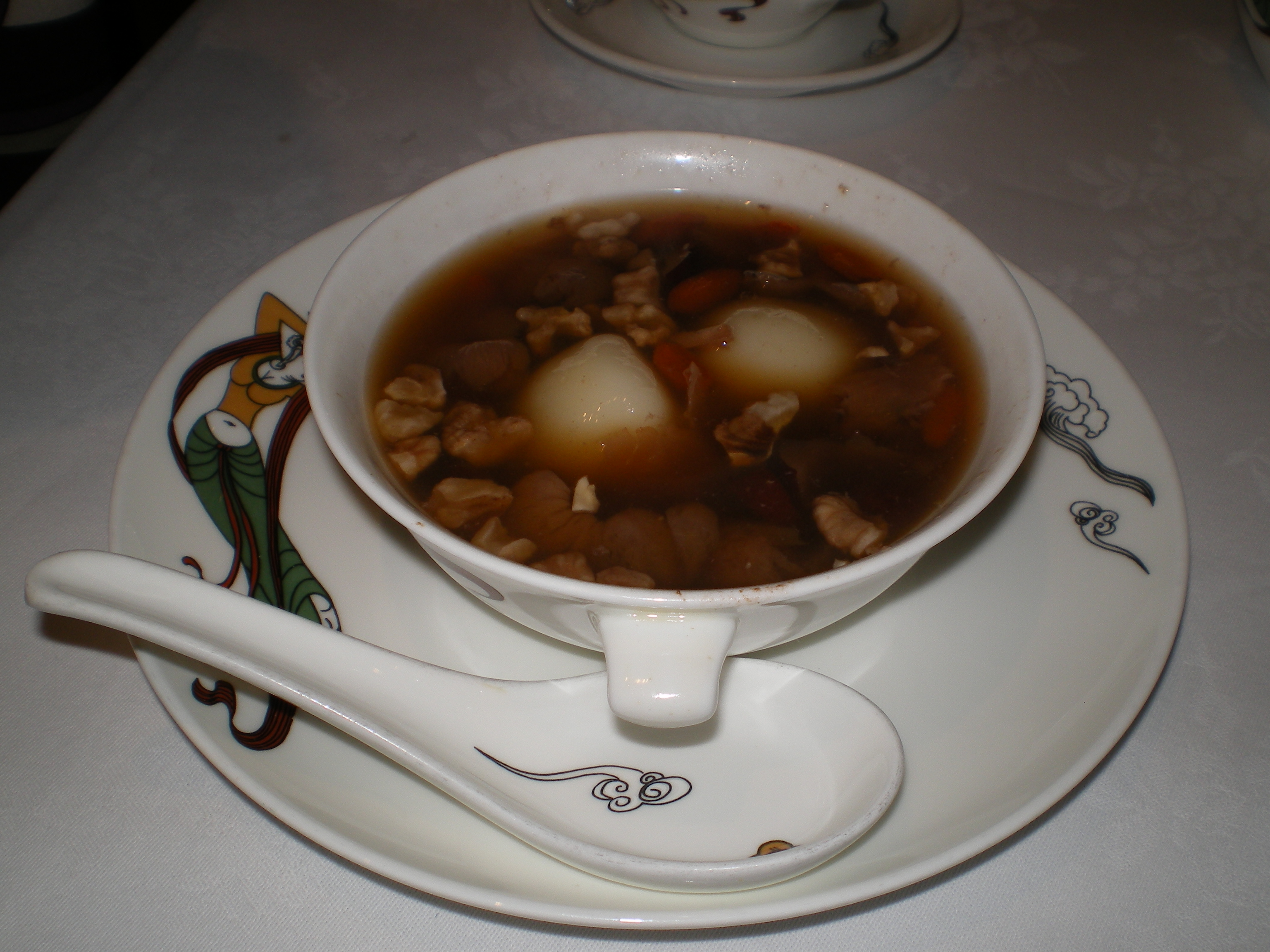
Tangyuan

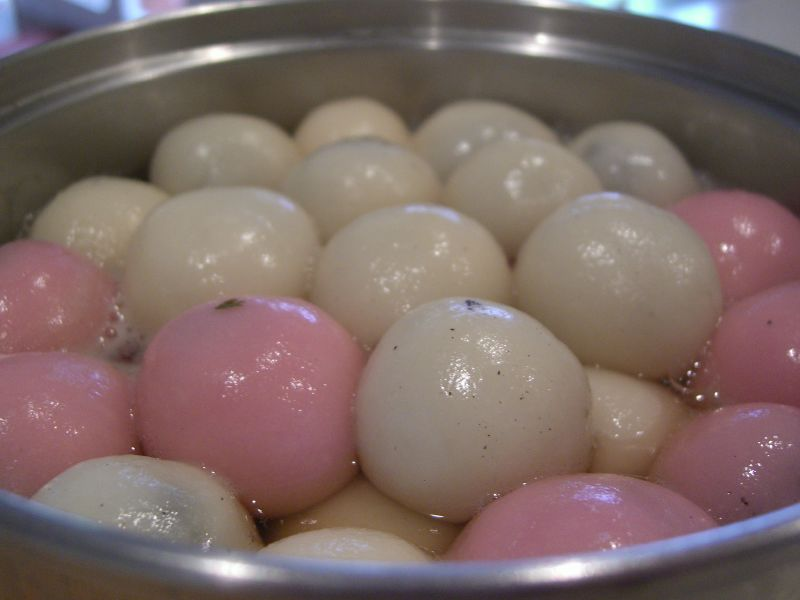
Tangyuan

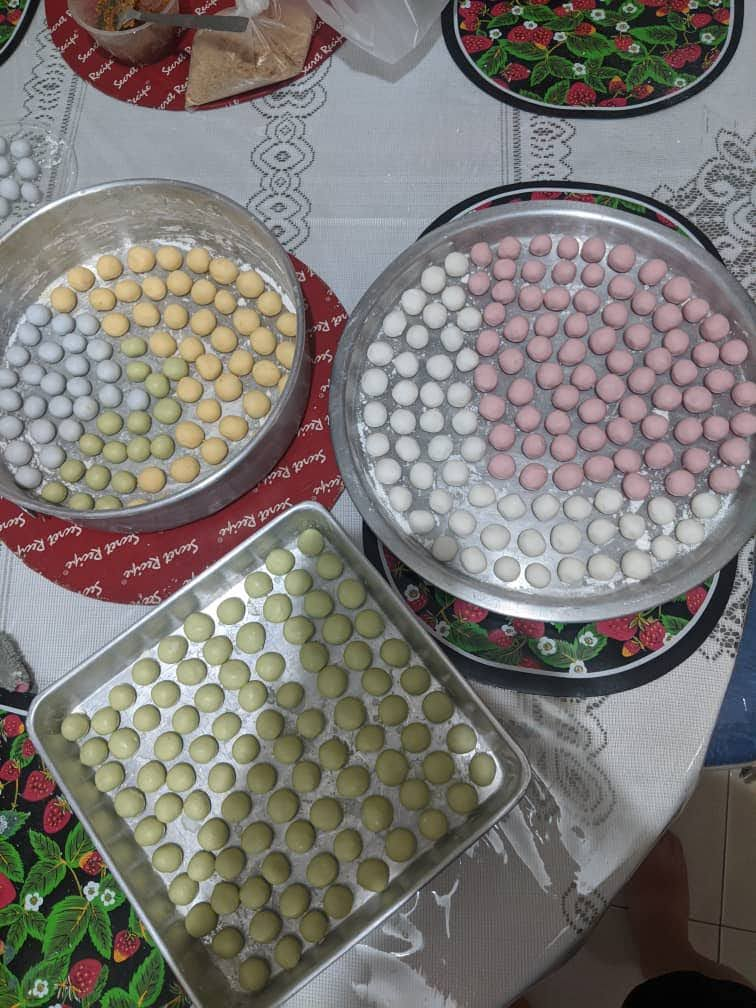
Tangyuan

=== 6th century and afterwards ===
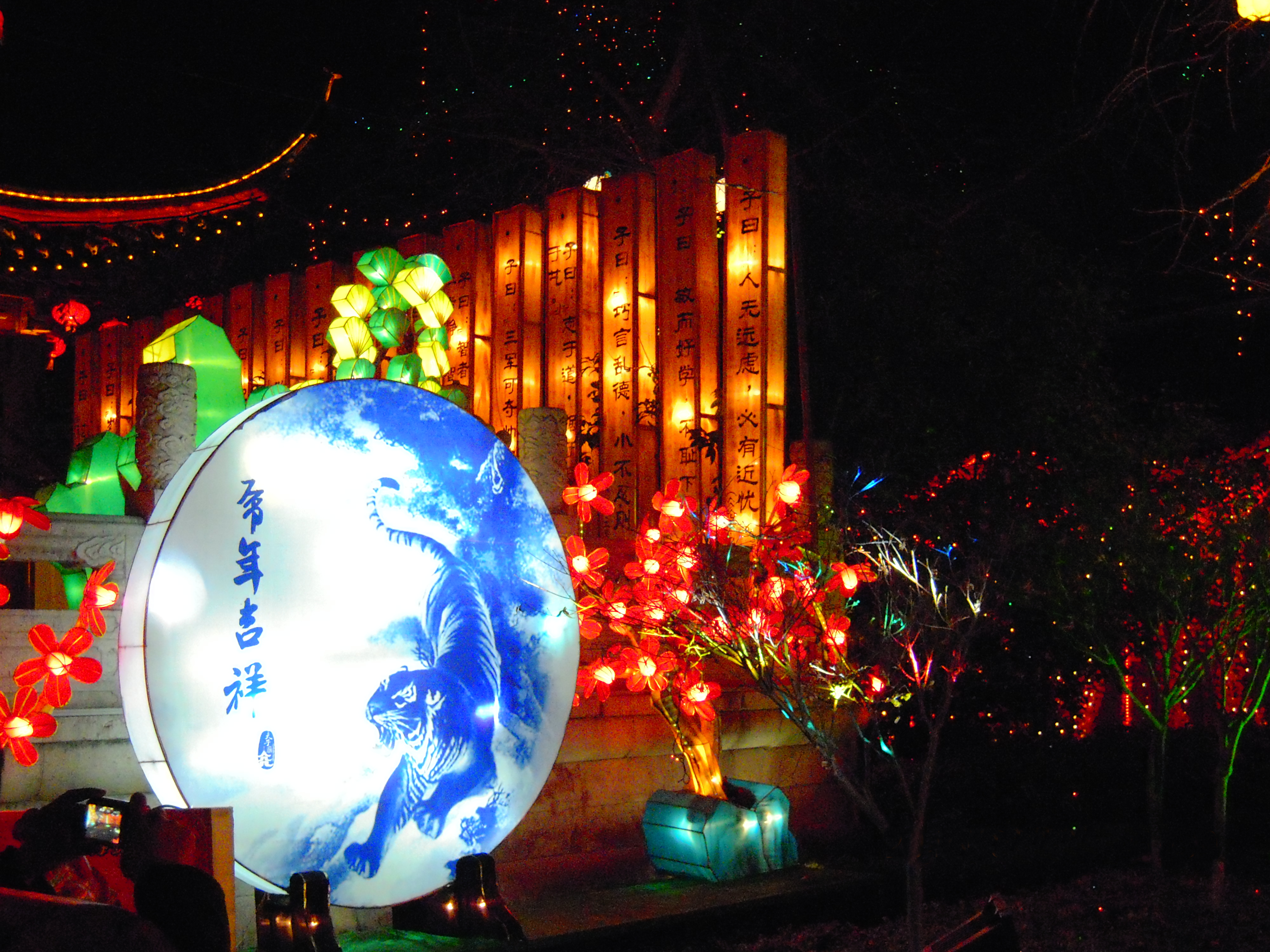
Lanterns in Qinhuai Lantern Fair

During the Sui dynasty in the sixth century, Emperor Yang invited envoys from other countries to China to see the colourful lighted lanterns and enjoy the gala performances.

By the beginning of the Tang dynasty in the seventh century, the lantern displays would last three days. The emperor also lifted the curfew, allowing the people to enjoy the festive lanterns day and night. It is not difficult to find Chinese poems which describe this happy scene.

In the Song dynasty, the festival was celebrated for five days and the activities began to spread to many of the big cities in China.

Today, displaying lanterns remains a major tradition across China on the fifteenth day of the first lunisolar month. Chengdu in southwest China's Sichuan Province, for example, holds a lantern fair each year in Culture Park. During the Lantern Festival, the park is a virtual ocean of lanterns. Many new designs attract large numbers of visitors. The most eye-catching lantern is the Dragon Pole. This is a lantern in the shape of a golden dragon, spiraling up a 38-meter-high pole, spewing fireworks from its mouth. Cities such as Hangzhou and Shanghai have adopted electric and neon lanterns, which can often be seen beside their traditional paper or wooden counterparts. Another popular activity at this festival is guessing lantern riddles, a tradition which dates back to the Song dynasty.

=== Festivities ===
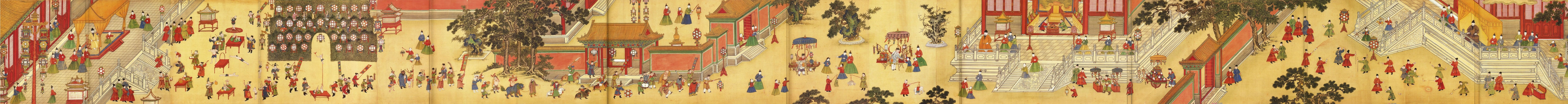
This painting, by an imperial court painter in 1485, depicts the Chenghua Emperor enjoying the festivities with families in the Forbidden City during the traditional Chinese Lantern Festival. It includes acrobatic performances, operas, magic shows and setting off firecrackers.

Lion dance (舞獅), walking on stilts (踩高蹺), riddle games (猜燈謎), and dragon dances (耍龍燈) are very popular activities during the festival day and the days following.

The lantern riddle, according to Japanese scholars, became popular as early as the Northern Song dynasty (960–1126). The lantern riddles are done by a host blocking one side of the lantern and pasting riddles on the remaining three sides of the lanterns. Participants will guess the blocked side by solving the riddles, which is called "breaking/solving lantern riddles". The theme of riddles can be drawn from classics, biographies, poetry, the various philosophers' well-known stories and novels, proverbs, (the names of) all kinds of birds, animals, and insects, as well as flowers, grasses, vegetables, and herbs. Participants can tear off the riddle of the lantern and let the host verify their answers. Those who answer the correct answer can get a "riddle reward", including ink, paper, writing brushes, ink slabs, fans, perfumed sachets, fruit, or eatables.

== See also ==
- Daeboreum, the Korean festival on the same day
- Sagichō Fire Festival, the Japanese (Shintoist) festival held in January
- Bon Festival, the Japanese Buddhist festival held in August
- Festival of Lights (disambiguation), a list of various festivals associated with light
- 15th of Shevat, the New Year for Trees in the Hebrew calendar
- Giant Lantern Festival, the Filipino annual festival for Christmas held in mid-December in the City of San Fernando in the Philippines
