= Millbrook (musician) =

Luxembourgish DJ, record producer, and video game developer

Michel Losch, known professionally as Millbrook, is a Luxembourgish DJ, record producer, and video game developer. Born and raised in Luxembourg, Millbrook eventually moved to Berlin, and he rose to mainstream success in 2019 with singles such as "Refractions" and "The Rise."

== Early life ==
Millbrook was born in Luxembourg in Western Europe. Early childhood interests of his included fingerskating, LEGO building, and the Rubik's Cube, before he eventually settled on music production.

== Career ==
Millbrook rose to fame in 2019 with his first two singles, "Refractions" and "The Rise." He originally worked under the stage name Vacuum, though he changed it to Millbrook as a way of giving himself "a new start" and as part of an effort in "creating a new name, taking what I learned as Vacuum, combining it with his industry experience, and shoot for the stars."

On May 28, 2021, he released "Green Light" featuring Cara Islay, followed three weeks later by "Instincts" featuring Nova Sky.

On April 6, 2023, his single, "Overdrive" was released.

In 2024, Millbrook developed a video game, Rooftops & Alleys: The Parkour Game, released on May 21, 2024. The game sold 70,000 copies on Steam within its first 30 days.
