= Red light =

Red light or redlight may refer to:

== Science and technology ==
- Red, any of a number of similar colors evoked by light in the wavelength range of 630–740 nm
  - Red light, a traffic light color signifying stop
  - Red light, a color of safelight used in photographic darkrooms
  - Red light therapy

== Arts and entertainment ==
- Red Lights (novel) (Feux Rouges), a 1953 book by Georges Simenon

=== Film ===
- Red Lights (1923 film), a 1923 American silent film
- Red Light (film), a 1949 crime film starring George Raft
- Red Lights (2004 film) (Feux rouges), a French thriller directed by Cédric Kahn
- Red Lights (2012 film), a thriller by Rodrigo Cortés
- Redlight (film), a 2009 documentary film
- Redlights, a 2023 short film by Eva Thomas that was subsequently expanded into the 2025 feature Nika and Madison

=== Music ===
- Red Light, a sublabel of Tunnel Records
- Redlight (musician) (born 1980), British electronic musician

==== Albums ====
- Red Light (Bladee album), 2018
- Red Light (f(x) album), 2014
- Redlight (Grails album), 2004
- Redlight (The Slackers album), 1997
- Red Light!, by Indigo Swing, 1999

==== Songs ====
- "Red Light" (Linda Clifford song)
- "Red Light" (David Nail song)
- "Red Light" (Siouxsie and the Banshees song)
- "Red Light" (U2 song)
- "Redlight" (song), by Ian Carey
- "Red Lights" (song), by Tiësto
- "Red Lights", by Curiosity Killed The Cat from Keep Your Distance
- "Red Light", by Fastball from Keep Your Wig On
- "Red Light", by Jonny Lang from Long Time Coming
- "Red Light", by Eddie Murphy, featuring Snoop Dogg
- "Red Light", by The Strokes from First Impressions of Earth
- "Red Light", by Wall of Voodoo from Dark Continent
- "Red Light!", by XXXTentacion from A Ghetto Christmas Carol
- "Redlight", by Destroy Lonely from If Looks Could Kill
- "Redlight", by Kelly Osbourne from Sleeping in the Nothing
- "Red Lights", by Stray Kids from Noeasy
- "Red Lights", by Chloe x Halle from Sugar Symphony

== Other uses ==
- Redlight Children Campaign, an American non-profit organization
- Common synonym for goals in ice hockey, derived from the red lamp behind the net activated to confirm a goal
- André Racicot (born 1969), nicknamed "Red Light", retired ice hockey goalie
- Operation Red Light II, a 2006 coalition military operation of the Iraq War

== See also ==
- Red-light district, a part of an urban area where there is a concentration of prostitution and sex-oriented businesses
- Red Light Lizzie (fl. 1860–1875), a 19th-century madam and underworld figure in New York City
- Red light/Green light, a traditional children's game
- Red Lantern (disambiguation)
- Green light (disambiguation)
