= Blue Light =

Blue Light, Blue light or Blue Lights may refer to:

== Science and technology ==
- Portion of the visible spectrum related to the blue color
  - Blue laser
  - Blue LED
- Cherenkov radiation, the physical phenomenon responsible for the characteristic blue glow in nuclear reactors
- Blue light (pyrotechnic signal), a firework composition used for night-time signaling and illumination
- Biological effects of high-energy visible light

== Military ==
- Blue Light (unit), a 1970s US counter-terrorist subunit of the United States Army's 5th Special Forces Group

== Emergency services ==
- Blue lights, also known as blues and twos services, British emergency services
- Blue lights, emergency telephone systems meant to deter crime, specially designed for use on campuses

== Arts, entertainment and media ==
=== Film and television ===
- The Blue Light (1932 film), a 1932 film directed by Leni Riefenstahl
- The Blue Light (2003 film), a 2003 Japanese film directed by Yukio Ninagawa
- Blue Light (TV series), a 1966 television series starring Robert Goulet
- Blue Lights (2023 TV series), a Northern Irish television series

=== Literature ===
- Blue Light (novel), 1998 novel by Walter Mosley
- Blue Light, an alternative title to The Transall Saga, a novel by Gary Paulsen
- "The Blue Light" (fairytale), a Brothers Grimm fairy tale

=== Music ===
==== Albums and EPs ====
- Blue Light, an EP by Aoife O'Donovan released in 2010
- Blue Lights (album), an album by Kenny Burrell released as two volumes in 1958

==== Songs ====
- "Blue Light", a song by Armageddon Dildos from their 1997 album Speed
- "Blue Light", a song by Bloc Party from their 2005 album Silent Alarm
- "Blue Light", a song by David Gilmour from his 1984 album About Face
- "Blue Light", a song by Mazzy Star from their 1993 album So Tonight That I Might See
- "Blue Light", a song by Miranda Sex Garden from their 1992 EP Iris
- "Blue Light", a song by Mitski from her 2018 album Be the Cowboy
- "Blue Light", a song by Mostly Autumn from their 2006 album Heart Full of Sky
- "Blue Light", a song by Prince from the Love Symbol Album
- "Blue Light", a song from Braggin' in Brass: The Immortal 1938 Year
- "Blue Lights" (song), a song by Jorja Smith from her 2018 album Lost & Found
- "Blue Lights", a song by James Barker Band from their 2025 album One of Us
- "The Blue Light", a song by Frank Zappa from his 1981 album Tinsel Town Rebellion

== Other uses ==
- Blue Light (horse) (born 1958), Canadian racehorse
- Blue Light, a Canadian beer made by the Labatt Brewing Company
- Blue Light Specials, sales held at Kmart stores

== See also ==
- Blue Lights in the Basement, a studio album by American singer Roberta Flack released in 1977
- Blue light phototherapy, light therapy involving a medical device that radiates blue light
- Cobalt blue light, a type of light used by slit lamps to help in the diagnosis of eye diseases
- Effects of blue light technology
- Blue Lanterns (disambiguation)
- Bluelight (disambiguation)
