= The Transall Saga =

1998 novel by Gary Paulsen

- Book cover of: The Transall Saga
- Author: Gary Paulsen
- Cover artist: Jon Paul Ferrara, Chris Nurse
- Language: English
- Subject: Survival, post-apocalypse speculative evolution
- Genre: Novel, science fiction, speculative evolution
- Publisher: Bantam Doubleday Dell Books for young readers a division of Random House Inc.
- Publication date: 1998
- Publication place: United States
- Media type: Hardcover Paperback and Audible
- Pages: 256
- ISBN: 978-0-606-17349-0

The Transall Saga is a 1998 post-apocalyptic survival novel by American author Gary Paulsen. It is a survival story like most of his other books but also involves the science fiction genre. There are also themes of speculative evolution.

== Premise ==
While hiking through the Magruder Missile Range (desert), thirteen-year old Mark Harrison is suddenly brought to a desolate landscape where he must survive not only the giant howling things that roam the almost endless wasteland. but the various primitive tribes that follow a mysterious deity known to them as the Merkon.

== Reception ==
The Transall Saga was generally well received by critics, including starred reviews from Booklist and Publishers Weekly.

In a more critical review, Kirkus Reviews noted that the "language is plain, action-oriented, and always driven toward cliff-hanging chapter endings", though the novel uses "some powerful if old-fashioned archetypes" and "there is little in the way of character development".

The Young Adult Library Services Association included The Transall Saga on their 1999 list of Quick Picks for Reluctant Young Adult Readers.
