= Greenlight (Internet service) =

Greenlight is a bundled telecommunications service owned by the city of Wilson, North Carolina. Its services are distributed over a fiber-optic network that was constructed by the city. The service has attracted attention because of the controversy surrounding its competition with Time Warner Cable and CenturyLink.

== Regulation ==
The North Carolina legislature passed a law in 2011 prohibiting municipal telecommunication services, but Wilson was able to carve out an exemption, because Greenlight was already providing such services.

As part of the Commerce Clause of the federal government, federal regulatory power supersedes state authority. State laws which restricted consumer choice of internet access providers were preempted by a Federal Communications Commission order taken on Thursday February 26, 2015. The FCC order relies on section 706 of the 1996 Telecommunications Act, the first federal legislation to regulate the internet. However, the US Court of Appeals Sixth Circuit overruled the order, citing a lack of specific authority in the enabling legislation. The United States Congress would have to intervene to give FCC authority by amending the 1996 Telecommunication Act.

== Creation ==
In order to fund the Greenlight project, the city of Wilson used funds from bonds, instead of taxpayer money.

== See also ==
- Official website
