= Braggin' in Brass: The Immortal 1938 Year =

1991 compilation album by Duke Ellington

Compilation album by Duke Ellington
- Released: 1991
- Recorded: August 4 & 9, September 2, December 19 & 22, 1938
- Genre: Jazz
- Label: Portrait

Duke Ellington chronology
The Blanton–Webster Band (1990)	Braggin' in Brass: The Immortal 1938 Year (1991)

Braggin' in Brass: The Immortal 1938 Year is a compilation album of American pianist, composer and bandleader Duke Ellington's 1938 recordings for the Brunswick label, released in 1991.

== Reception ==
The AllMusic review by Stephen Cook stated that "this 1938 incarnation of Ellington's group held their own with many fine compositions, a seamless sense of swing, and a wealth of unique solo contributions, elements that set the group apart throughout the big-band era. Maybe not as essential as other Ellington titles, but still highly recommended".

Professional ratings
Review scores
Source	Rating
AllMusic	4/5 stars

== Track listing ==
All compositions by Duke Ellington except where noted

1. "Please Forgive Me" (Ellington, Irving Gordon, Irving Mills) – 2:59
2. "Lambeth Walk" (Douglas Furber, Noel Gay) – 2:27
3. "Prelude to a Kiss" (Ellington, Gordon, Mills) – 2:56
4. "Hip Chic" – 2:55
5. "Buffet Flat" – 2:24
6. "Mighty Like the Blues" (Leonard Feather) – 2:34
7. "Jazz Potpourri" – 2:55
8. "T.T. on Toast" (Ellington, Mills) – 2:45
9. "Battle of Swing" – 2:56
10. "Blue Light" – 2:36
11. "Blue Light" [alternate take] – 2:40
12. "Boy Meets Horn" (Ellington, Rex Stewart) – 2:59
13. "Slap Happy" – 2:44
- Recorded at ARC-Brunswick Studios in New York on August 4, 1938 (track 1), August 9, 1938 (tracks 2–5), September 2, 1938 (track 6), December 19, 1938 (tracks 7–9), and December 22, 1938 (tracks 10–13).

== Personnel ==
- Duke Ellington – piano
- Rex Stewart – cornet
- Wallace Jones, Cootie Williams – trumpet
- Lawrence Brown, Joe Nanton – trombone
- Juan Tizol – valve trombone
- Barney Bigard – tenor saxophone, clarinet
- Johnny Hodges – alto saxophone, soprano saxophone
- Otto Hardwick – clarinet, alto saxophone
- Harry Carney – baritone saxophone, clarinet, alto saxophone
- Fred Guy – guitar
- Billy Taylor – bass
- Sonny Greer – drums
