= Qinhuai River =

Tributary of the Yangtze river

Coordinates: 32°04′40″N 118°43′33″E

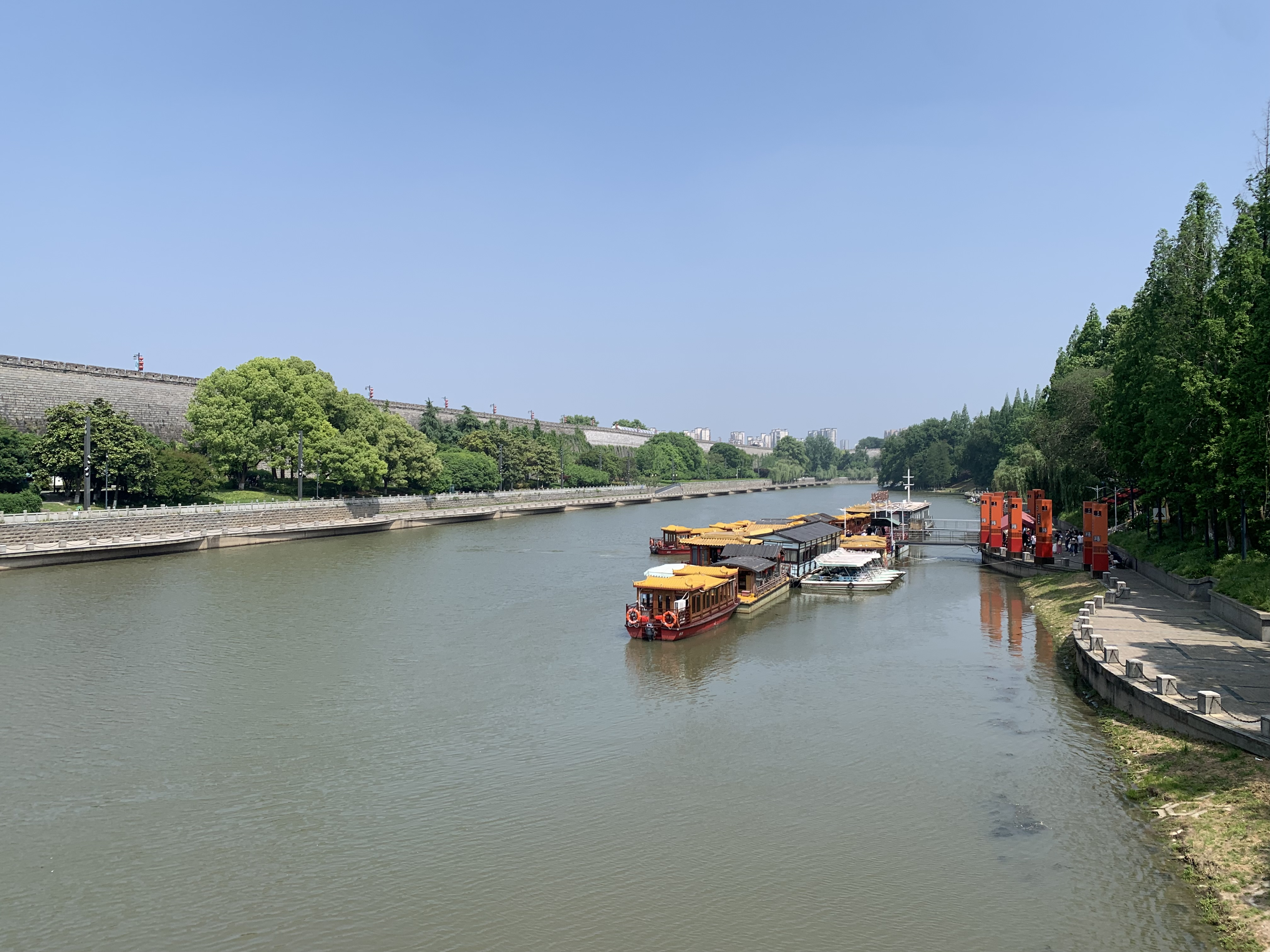
- The Qinhuai as it flows south of the walled city of Nanjing, near the Zhonghua Gate

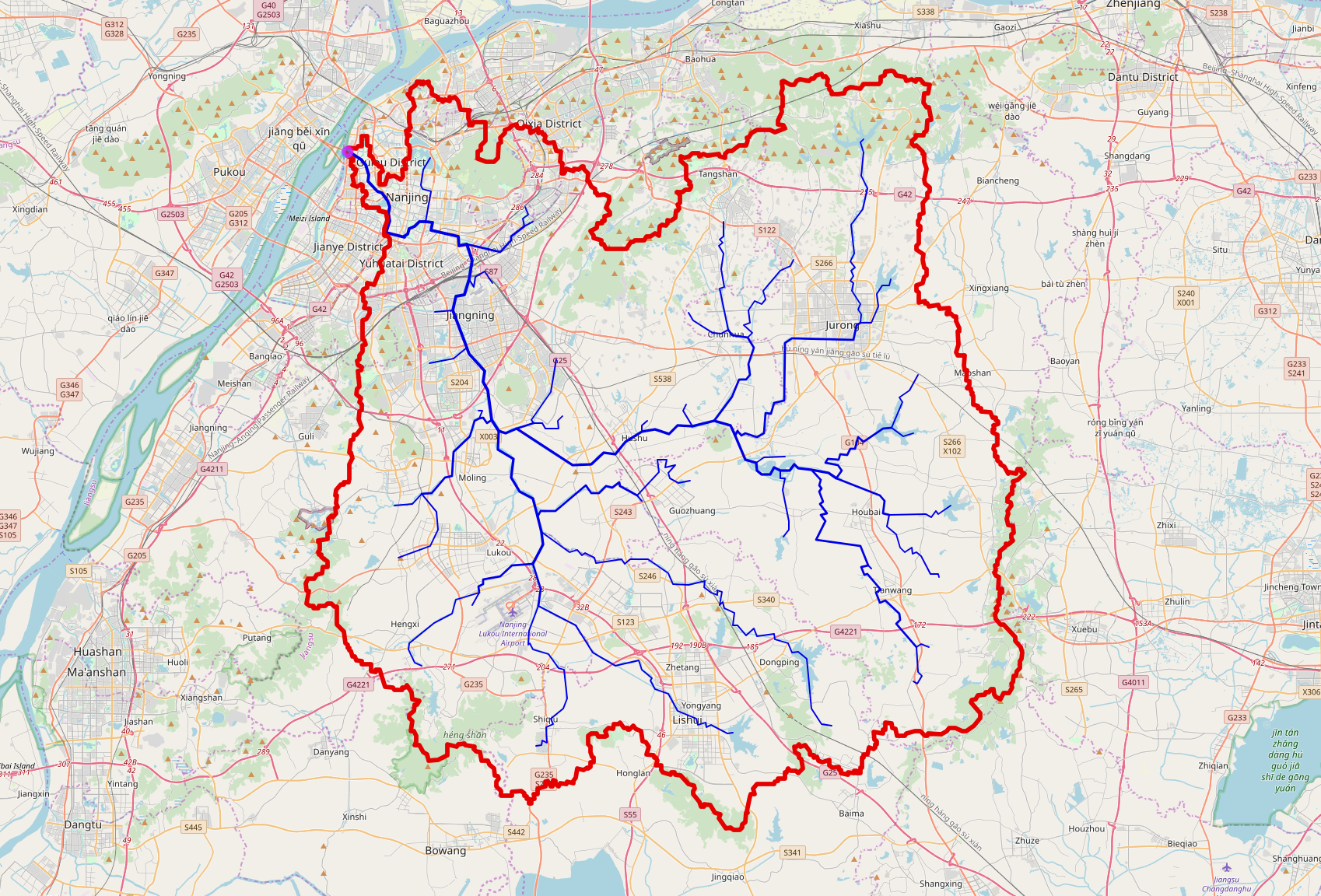
- Native name: 秦淮河 (Chinese)

Location
- Country: China
- Region: Nanjing, Jiangsu Province

Physical characteristics
- Length: 110 km
- Basin size: 2630 km^{2}

The Qinhuai River (秦淮河) is a tributary of the Yangtze with a total length of 110 km. It flows through central Nanjing and is called "Nanjing's mother river". It is the "life blood" of the city. The Qinhuai River is divided into inner and outer rivers.

The scenic belt along the Qinhuai River meets with the Confucius Temple at the center and the river serving as a bond. The belt, featuring attractions such as Zhanyuan Garden, the Confucius Temple, Egret Islet, China Gate as well as the sailing boats in the river and pavilions and towers on the riverbanks, is a blend of historic sites, gardens, barges, streets, pavilions, towers, folk culture and customs.

== History ==
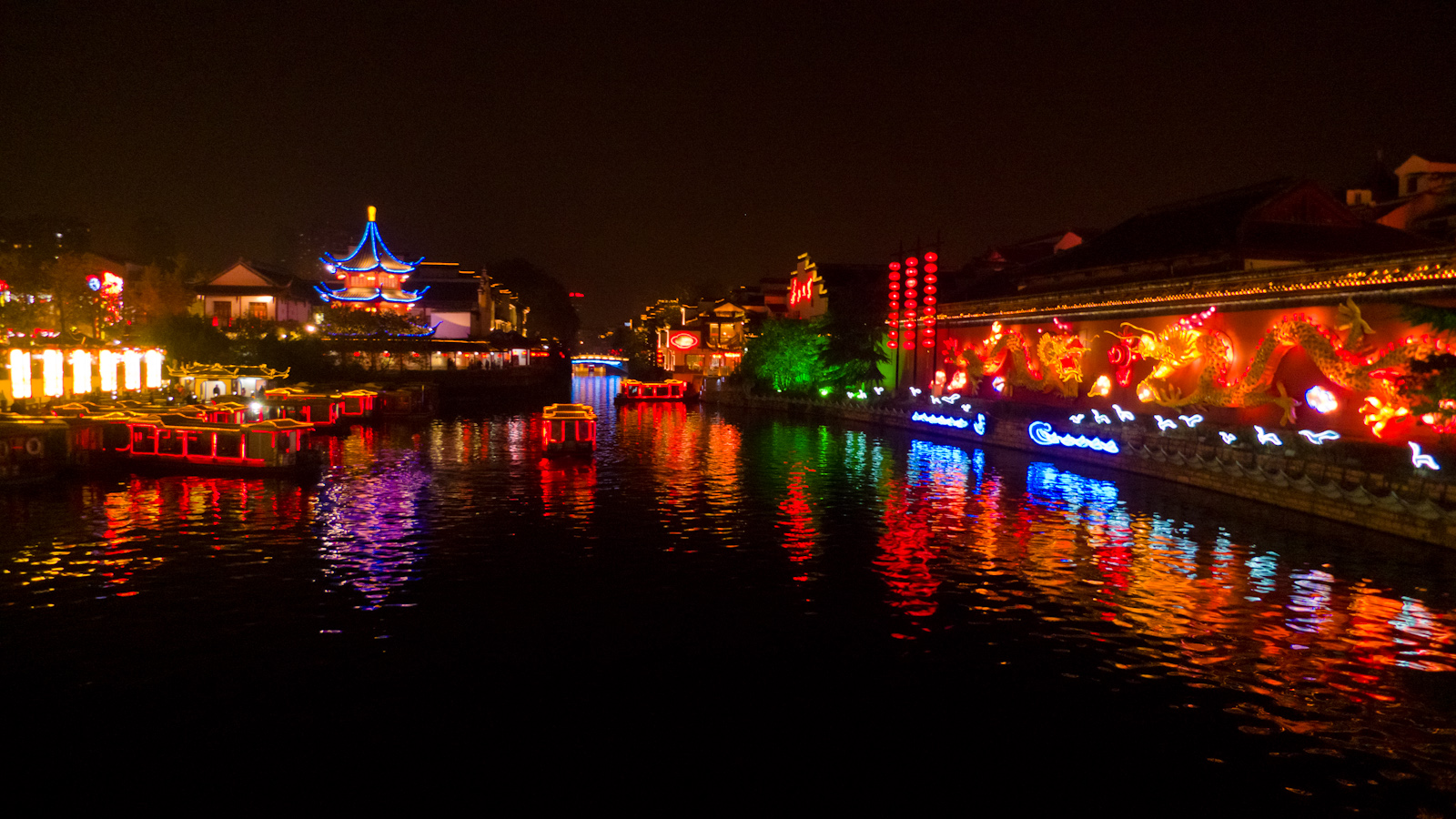
Qinhuai River night view

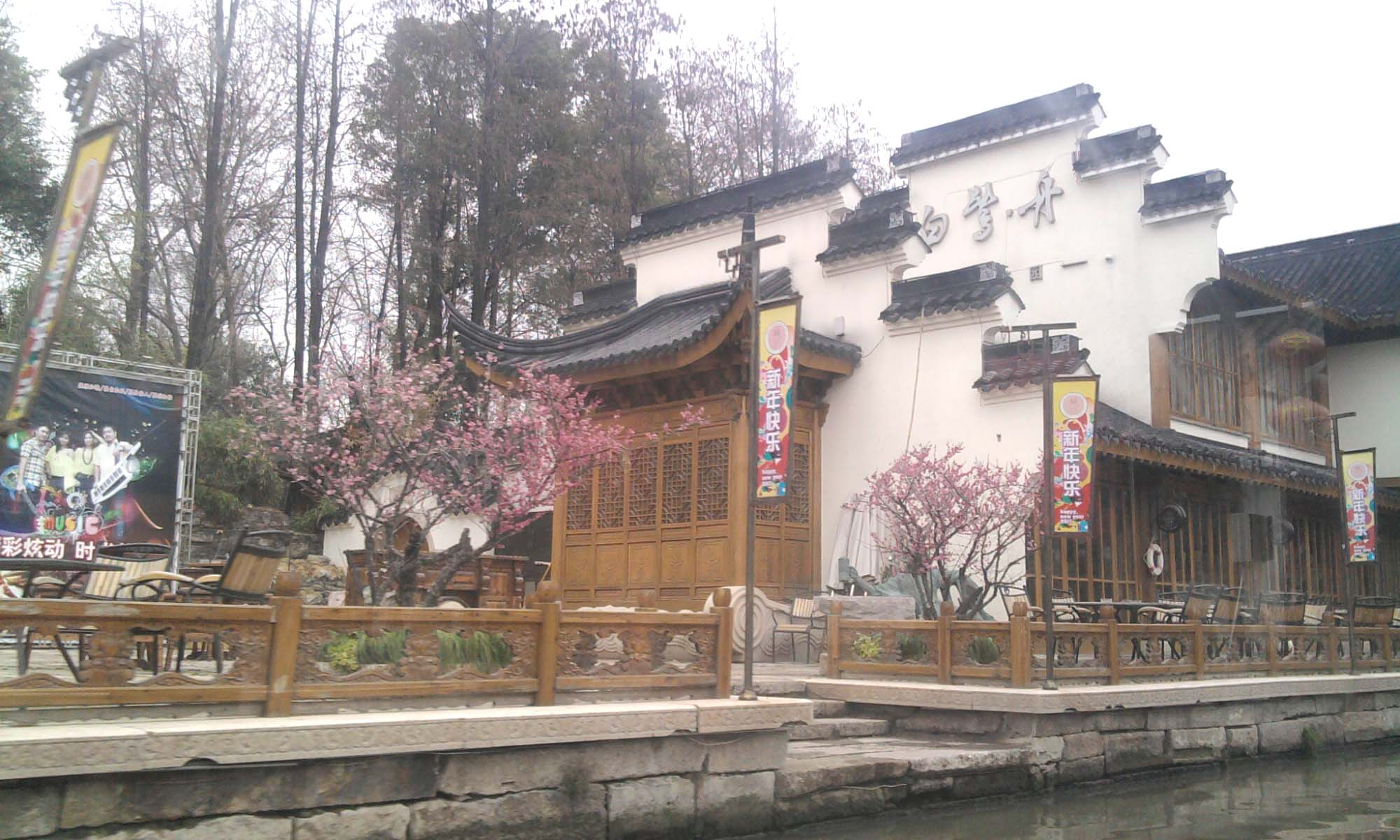
Restaurant on the Qinhuai River

The Qinhuai River used to be called Huai Water and was renamed Qinhuai to the legend that Qin Emperor Shihuang, the first emperor of the Qin dynasty (221–206 BC), ordered to introduce Huai Water to the city by excavating a mountain. It is a branch of the Yangtze River, running about 110 kilometres, a major watercourse around Nanjing City, Jiangsu Province. It was very famous in history but lost its fame due to wars, which destroyed many buildings along both banks. The water became filthy and no sign of wealth could be found anymore along its banks. After repair and restoration in 1985, the river became a beautiful resort. In Chinese ancient times, places around the Qinhuai River and the Confucian Temple were already very prosperous. The banks along the Qinhuai River were the gathering place for noble and wealthy families and were also frequently visited by scholars. Those places lost glory once in the Sui dynasty (581–618) and the Tang dynasty (618–907), but regained popularity in the Ming dynasty (1368–1644) and Qing dynasty (1644–1911).

The Qinhuai is a branch of the mighty Yangtze River and has nursed the rich civilization of the region. The inner parts of the river were once the red-light district – famous throughout the nation, during the Ming dynasty. Painted boats with red lanterns once shuttled to and fro.

The most prominent part of the Qinhuai River Scenic area in history is famous as a residential area of Qin Huai Ba Yan (秦淮八艳; the eight Beauties of Qinhuai), eight famous Gējì during the Ming-Qing transition period. They were recorded in the book Banqiao Zaji (板桥杂记) by Yu Huai (余怀). They were Gu Hengbo (顾横波), Dong Xiaowan, Bian Yujing (卞玉京), Li Xiangjun, Kou Baimen (寇白门), Ma Xianglan, Liu Rushi and Chen Yuanyuan.

During the Nanjing Massacre in 1937, the Qinhuai River was reddened with blood, as the river was filled with tens of thousands of bodies.

Many Chinese folk songs about the massacre talk in detail about the river during this time.

== Sightseeing ==
The area is a highly popular destination with both locals and tourists, and many see or buy goods here, or just take in the sights. Many visitors find it a good place to taste the local cuisine. Snack stalls dot the area, and offer a range of food: (baozi) steamed buns-stuffed with pork, and other delicate fillings, Bawei Dawei Doufunao (eight-flavored jellied bean curd pastries) roasted beef, salty duck, animal stomach, chicken feet (phoenix feet) and much more.

The former residence of famed geji Li Xiangjun is located along the Qinhuai River and is open to the public.
