= Timeline of Nanjing =

Coordinates: 32.05°N 118.766667°E

The following is a timeline of the history of the city of Nanjing, Jiangsu Province, China.

== Prehistory ==
- c. 600,000 BCE - Nanjing Man (Homo erectus) active.
- 7000 BCE - Beiyinyangying culture (北阴阳营文化, Běiyīnyángyíng wénhuà) active in Neolithic China.
- 3000s BCE - Dawenkou, Majiabang, and Songze cultures active.
- 2000s BCE - Liangzhu and Hushu cultures (湖熟文化, Húshú wénhuà) active.

== Zhou dynasty ==
- 472 BCE - Castle built near Yuhuatai by Yue (state).

== Three Kingdoms ==
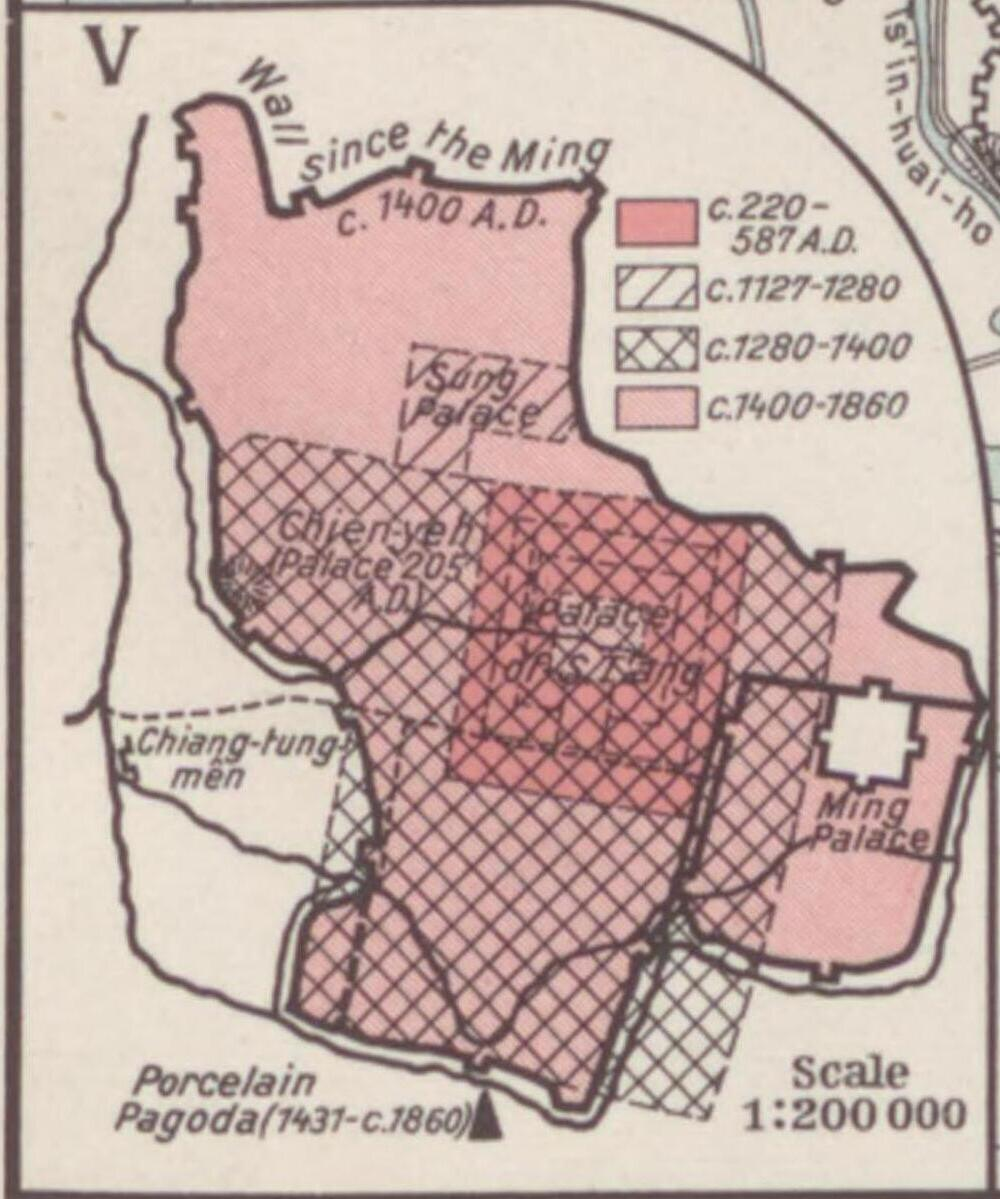
A 1935 map of the development of Nanjing from the Three Kingdoms to the Taiping Rebellion

- 229 CE - City becomes the capital of the Wu Kingdom.
- 258 - Imperial University founded.

== Jin dynasty ==
- 313 - City renamed "Jiankang."
- 317 - Capital of Eastern Jin Dynasty relocated to Jiankang.

== Northern & Southern Dynasties ==
- 420 - City becomes capital of the Liu Song Dynasty.
- 479 - City becomes capital of the Southern Qi Dynasty.
- 502 - City becomes capital of the Liang dynasty.
- 548–552 - Hou Jing Disturbance, including the city's besiegement, starvation, and massacre.
- 557 - City becomes capital of the Chen Dynasty.

== Five Dynasties & Ten Kingdoms ==
- 937 - Nan Tang in power.

== Song dynasty ==
- 1168 - Jiangnan Examination Hall built.

== Ming dynasty ==
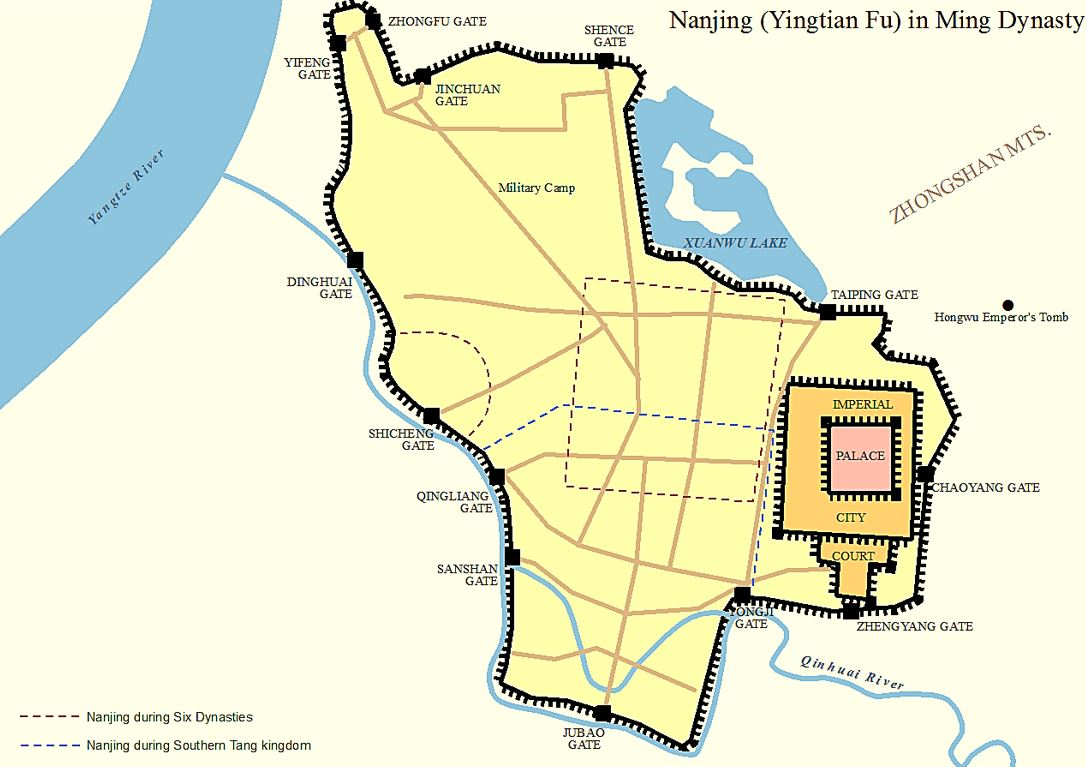
Map of Ming-era Nanjing, then known as Jinling or Yingtian

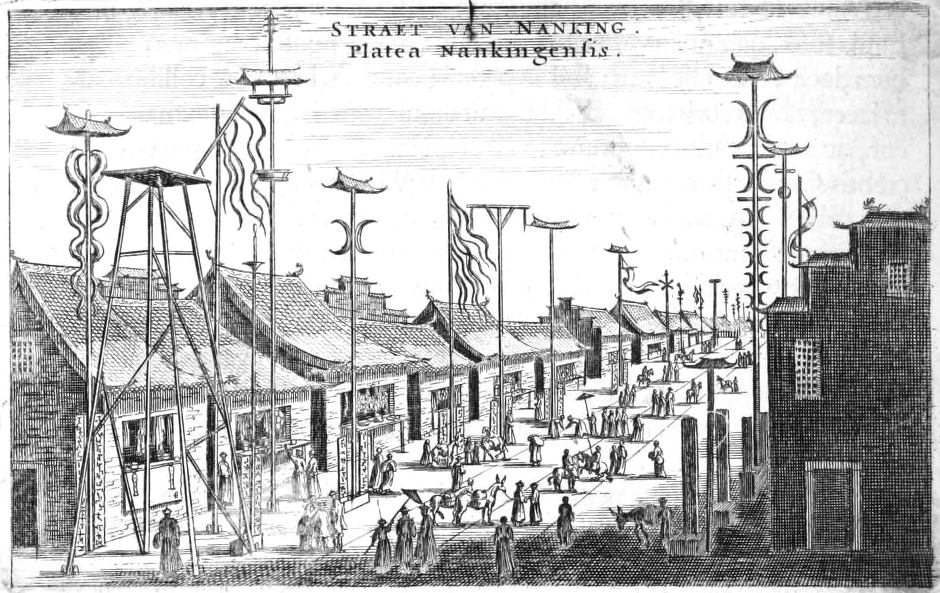
A fanciful imagining of Nanjing c. 1668 based on the Jesuit accounts

- 1367 - Construction of Ming Palace begun, completed in 1368.
- 1368 - City becomes capital of Ming Dynasty, renamed Yingtian.
- 1373 - Hongwu Emperor substantially expands Ming Palace compound, completed in 1375.
- 1381 - Imperial University campus relocated to Xuanwu Lake.
- 1382 - Drum Tower built.
- 1386 - City Wall of Nanjing and Jubao Gate constructed.
- 1408 - Yongle Encyclopedia written.
- 1421 - Capital of Ming Dynasty relocated from Nanjing to Beijing.
- 1430 - Porcelain Tower of Nanjing built.
- 1441 - Major Yangtze flood.

== Qing dynasty ==
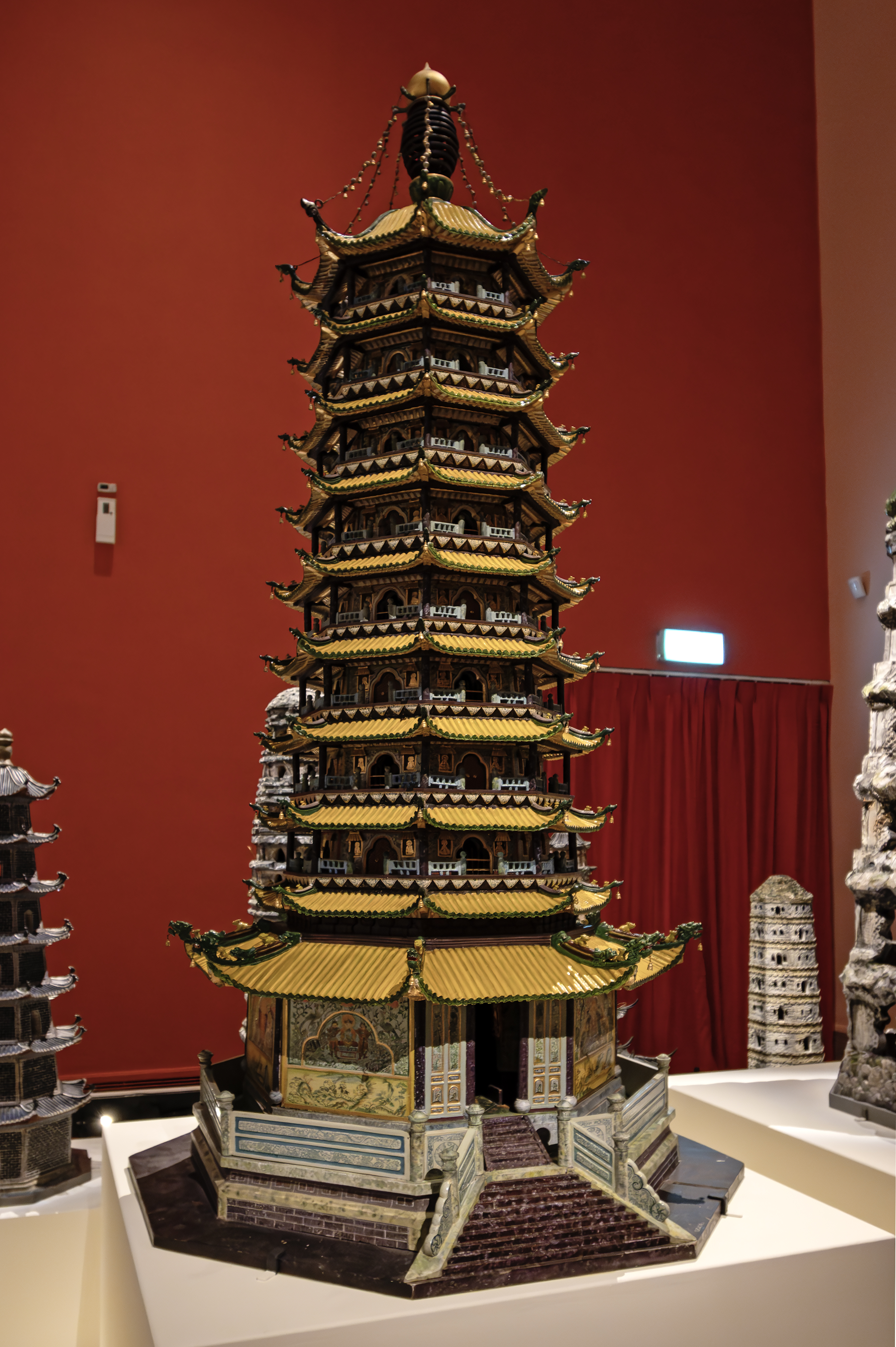
1915 model of the Porcelain Pagoda, destroyed during the Taiping Rebellion

- 1645 - Qing conquest of Nanjing; Nanzhili reorganized as Jiangnan, later divided into Jiangsu and Anhui
- 1657 - City besieged by forces of Koxinga.
- 1723 - Viceroy of Liangjiang residence relocated to Nanjing.
- 1842
  - British in power.
  - August 29: City the site of the Treaty of Nanking.
- 1853 - Taiping conquest of Nanjing in the First Battle of Nanjing.
- 1856 - Second Battle of Nanjing.
- 1858 - City designated a treaty port under the Treaties of Tianjin.
- 1864 - Third Battle of Nanking.
- 1870 - Chaotian Palace and Presidential Palace built.
- 1890 - Naval college opens.
- 1899 - Foreign trade begins.
- 1902 - Sanjiang Normal College (later renamed Nanjing Normal University) founded.
- 1907 - Jiangnan Library opens.
- 1909 - Shanghai–Nanjing railway opens.
- 1910
  - Nanyang industrial exposition.
  - Population: 140,000 (approximate).
- 1911
  - November 10: City besieged by Manchu forces.
  - December 2: Rebels take city.

== Republic of China ==
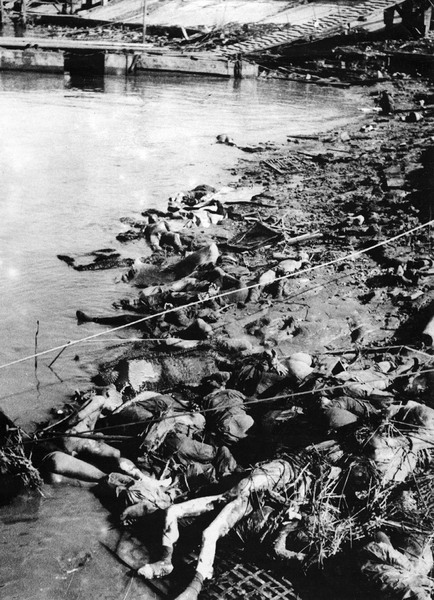
Piles of bodies beside the Yangtze River during the Nanjing Massacre

- 1921 - Population: 380,000.
- 1926 -
  - March 12: Sun Yat-sen dies.
- 1927
  - March: Nanjing Incident.
  - Nanjing Special (No.1) Popular Library founded.
- 1928
  - Central Guoshu Institute established.
  - Liu Chi-wen becomes mayor.
- 1929 - Sun Yat-sen Mausoleum completed.
- 1930 - Wei Tao-ming becomes mayor.
- 1931 - City becomes capital of the Republic of China.
- 1935 - Nanjing–Tongling railway opens.
- 1936 - Jiangsu Art Gallery founded.
- 1937
  - Nanking Safety Zone set up.
  - December 9: Battle of Nanking begins.
  - December 12: USS Panay incident.
  - December 13: Japanese forces take city.
- 1937–1938 - Nanjing Massacre.
- 1940
  - City becomes capital of the Reorganized National Government of China.
  - Cai Pei becomes mayor.
- 1941 - Zhou Xuechang becomes mayor.
- 1949 - April 23: People's Liberation Army takes city.

== People's Republic of China ==
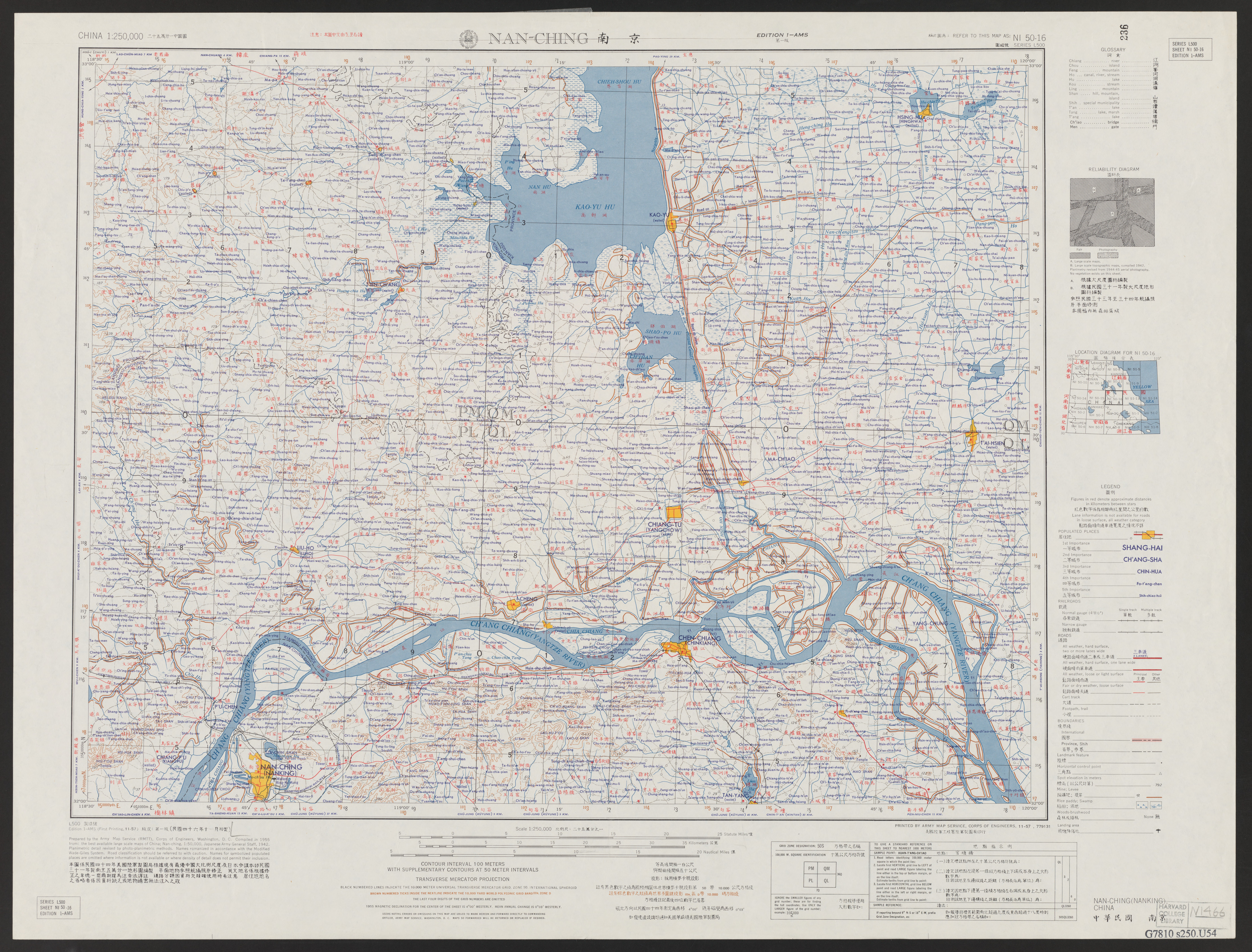
1:250,000 AMS map of the walled city of Nanjing ("Nanking" or "Nan-ching") and surrounding areas in the 1940s and 1950s

- 1952 - Nanjing College of Aviation Industry and Wutaishan Sports Center founded.
- 1953 - Nanjing University of Science and Technology founded.
- 1957 - Population: 1,419,000.
- 1958 - Taiping Kingdom History Museum opens.
- 1968
  - Nanjing Yangtze River Bridge constructed.
  - Nanjing Railway Station opens.
- 1988
  - December: Nanjing anti-African protests.
  - Nanjing High-tech Industrial Development Zone established.
- 1994 - Jiangsu Sainty Football Club formed.
- 1995 - City administration re-organized.
- 1996 - Jiangsu Dragons basketball team formed.
- 1997 - Lukou Airport opens.
- 2000 - Jiangning District becomes part of Nanjing municipality.
- 2001 - Second Nanjing Yangtze River Bridge constructed.
- 2002
  - Jiangpu and Liuhe districts become part of Nanjing municipality.
  - Luo Zhijun becomes mayor.
- 2004 - Longtan Containers Port Area opens.
- 2005
  - Third Nanjing Yangtze Bridge and Nanjing Olympic Sports Center opens.
  - Nanjing Metro and Nanjing–Qidong Railway begins operating.
  - 10th National Games of China held.
- 2008
  - Hefei–Nanjing Passenger Railway begins operating.
  - World Urban Forum held.
- 2009 - Zifeng Tower built.
- 2010
  - July 28: Chemical plant explosion.
  - Nanjing Dashengguan Yangtze River Bridge built.
- 2013 - Air pollution in Nanjing reaches annual mean of 72 PM2.5 and 137 PM10, much higher than recommended.
- 2014 - 2014 Summer Youth Olympics held.

== See also ==
- Nanjing history
- List of Nanjing art groups
- Population of Nanking in December of 1937
- Urbanization in China
