= Mendong (Nanjing) =

Historical district in Nanjing

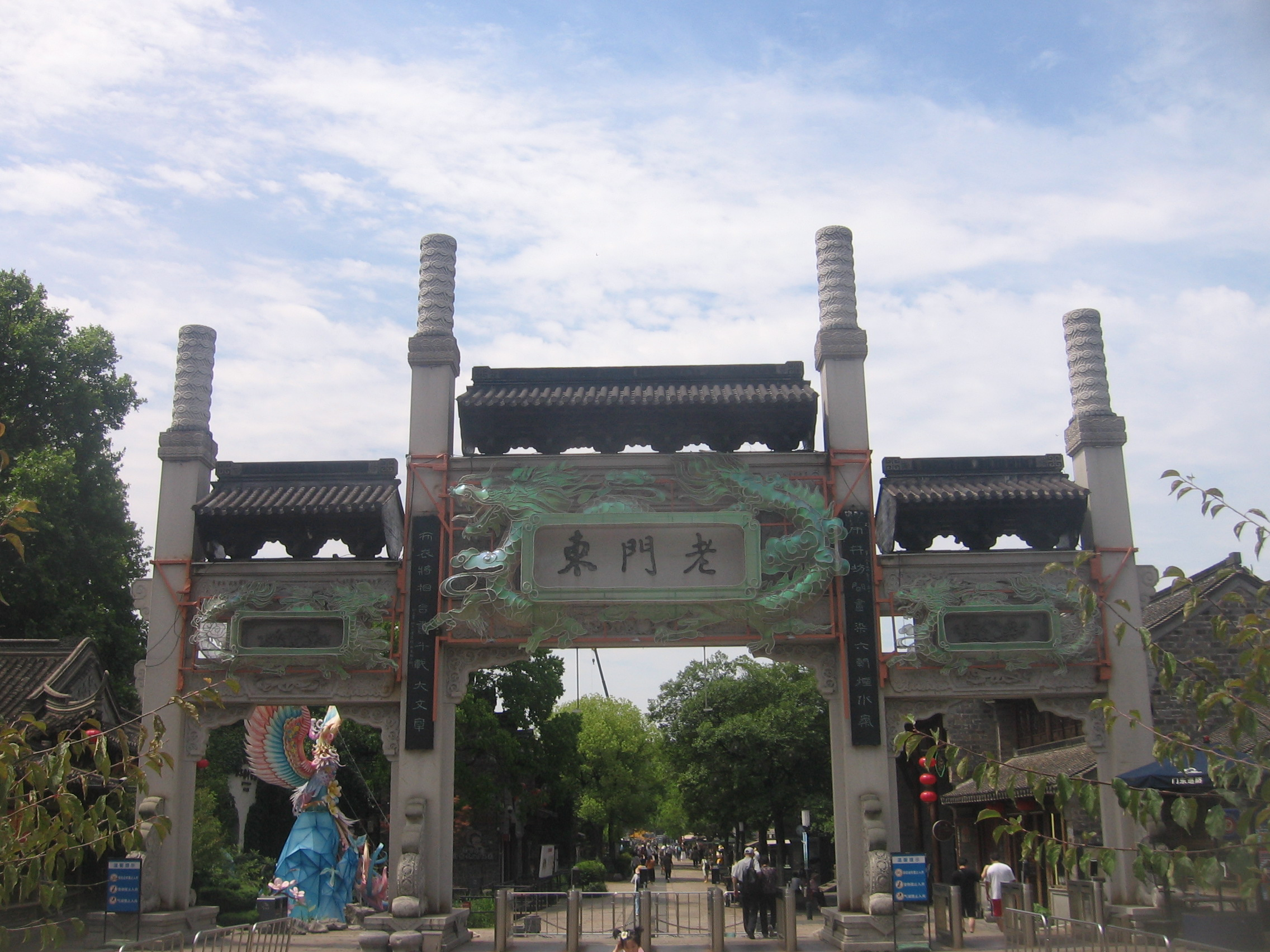
Laomendong

Mendong (Chinese: 门东) is a historical district in the Qinhuai District of Nanjing, Jiangsu, China. It comprises the southern part of the city within the walls and to the east of the Zhonghua Gate, in contrast to the "Menxi" area to the west of the Gate of China. The east and south sides of Mendong are bordered by the City Wall of Nanjing, extending westward to Zhonghua Road. The Qinhuai River runs through the entire area.

In the early 21st century, the southern part of Mendong in Nanjing, south of Madao Street, north to Jianzi Lane, south to the South City Wall (Xinmin Fang), and west to Shangjiang Kao Peng, including the areas of Gutong Lane, Santiaoying, Zhongying, and Bianying, were named the Old Mendong Historical and Cultural Block.
