= Nanjing Historical & Cultural Cities Expo =

Cultural event held in Nanjing, China

The Nanjing Historical & Cultural Cities Expo is an international cultural event held in Nanjing, China. The expo is held every two years, and the first one was held in 2004. The meeting is sponsored by the Ministry of Culture, Ministry of Housing and Urban-Rural Development of the People's Republic of China, National Cultural Heritage Administration and the National Commissions for UNESCO, and undertaken by Nanjing Municipal People’s Government, Jiangsu Provincial Department of Culture and Tourism, Jiangsu Provincial Department of Housing and Urban-Rural Development... From the first to the eighth, 276 domestic and foreign cultural city mayors from 74 countries and regions participated. In May 2013, the Organizing Committee of Famous City Club and UNESCO has signed a strategic cooperation agreement.

== Previous themes ==
Number	Year	Date	theme
1	2004	April 30 to May 6	Ancient Capital Nanjing·Shanshui Renjia
2	2006	September 22 to September 28	Promote cultural development and build a harmonious city
3	2008	November 3 to November 7	Gather world cultures and share the harmony of the city
4	2010	October 20 to October 24	Culture makes the city more exciting
5	2012	September 5 to September 9	Creativity, let the city bloom with youth
6	2014	September 26 to September 27	Protect cultural heritage and promote sustainable urban development
7	2016	October 23 to October 26	Diversity, Open and Creation
8	2018	May 26 to May 28	Mutual learning, sharing and win-win

== City list ==
City list
China city	Nanjing	Luoyang	Beijing	Xi'an
China city	Dunhuang	Kaifeng	Zhengzhou	Anyang
China city	Changsha	Chengde	Huaian	Chengdu
China city	Lijiang	Pingyao	Hefei	Changzhou
China city	Guilin	Harbin		
Foreign cities	Vienna	Milan	Budapest	Saint Petersburg
Foreign cities	Paris	Melbourne	Florence	Strasbourg
Foreign cities	Los Angeles	Perth	Buenos Aires	Bern
Foreign cities	Kyoto	Nagoya	Sapporo	Statewide
Foreign cities	Rome	Marseille	Auckland	Hasselt
Foreign cities	Barcelona	Stockholm	Kraków	Bloemfontein
Foreign cities	Lausanne	Ho Chi Minh City	Eindhoven	Daejeon
Foreign cities	Leipzig	Rotorua	Göttingen	Malacca

=== First ===
The first World Historical and Cultural Cities Expo, also known as "2004 Famous Cities Exhibition · Residential Culture Exhibition", was held at Nanjing International Convention and Exhibition Center on April 30, 2004. The theme was "Ancient Capital Nanjing · Landscapes and Homes". 11 foreign cities including Barcelona, Florence, Kyoto, Paris, St. Petersburg, Vienna, etc., as well as the seven ancient capitals of Beijing, Hangzhou, Xi’an, Zhengzhou, Luoyang, Kaifeng, Anyang and Chengde, Lijiang, Pingyao And other world cultural heritage cities. Jointly discuss the cultural exchange and heritage protection of the world's historical and cultural cities, and publish the "Nanjing Declaration".

=== Second ===
The 2nd World Historical and Cultural Cities Expo was held on September 22, 2006 at Zhonghua Gate Castle, Nanjing, with the theme of "Promoting Cultural Development and Building a Harmonious City". 53 famous Chinese and foreign city mayors and more than 3,000 domestic and foreign guests visited Nanjing. The famous city club has 43,000 square meters of exhibition halls, 1,500 standard booths, 20 sub-events, and a total of more than 2 million exhibits. The total on-site transaction volume exceeded 20 million yuan, and the intended transaction volume was nearly 150 million yuan.

=== Third ===
The 3rd World Historical and Cultural Cities Expo was held in Nanjing Bailuzhou Park on November 3, 2008, with the theme of "Gathering World Cultures and Sharing the Harmony of the City". This year's famous city will hold 110 events in 10 categories, including opening and closing ceremonies, theme forums, cultural exhibitions, cultural industry fairs, cultural festivals, cultural performances, cultural events, cultural tourism, cultural theme activities, and carnivals. The guests at the meeting included United Nations Deputy Secretary-General Sha Zukang and other United Nations officials, national ministries and commissions, provincial and municipal leaders, and some domestic and foreign guests who came to Nanjing to participate in the Fourth World Urban Forum.

=== Fourth ===
The 4th World Historical and Cultural Cities Expo was held on October 20, 2010 at the "Zheng He Bao Shipyard" at No. 1 Yangtze River Avenue. The theme is "Culture, Make the City More Wonderful". Including Paris, France, Rome, Italy, Göttingen, Germany, Olympia, Greece, Perth, Australia, Nagoya, Japan, as well as 49 cities from Belgium, Sweden, Switzerland and other countries participated. During the period, there were French Fashion Exhibition, Russian Patriotic War Exhibition, Ukrainian Oil Painting Exhibition, International Youth Art Film Summit, Chinese and Foreign Poetry Society, Qinhuai River Seine River Cultural Dialogue, International Music Festival and other international exchange activities. According to the content of this year's famous city meeting, there are more than 100 activities in 6 sections, including Wuzhou Style, Youth Olympics, Chinese Charm, Splendid Jiangnan, Cultural and Creative Nanjing, and Jinling Carnival. The mascot of the famous city meeting was released for the first time. There are 3 mascots. The "Chinese dolls" with Nanjing characteristics-"Mingming", "Chengcheng" and "Huihui" are composed. The names of the three "dolls" are connected together to form the homophony of "Mingchenghui".

=== Fifth ===
The Fifth World Historical and Cultural Cities Expo was held on September 5, 2012 in Nanjing Xuanwu Lake Lotus Plaza. The theme is "Creativity, Let the City Bloom with Youth". As keywords. After the launching ceremony, a large-scale theatrical performance "Light and Shadow Dream Show·Light of the Famous City" was staged. A total of 54 domestic and foreign cities participated in the conference, including 22 foreign cities and 32 domestic cities.

=== Sixth ===
The 6th World Historical and Cultural Cities Expo was held in Nanjing on September 26, 2014, with the theme of "Protecting Cultural Heritage and Promoting Sustainable Urban Development". The mayors of more than 200 domestic and foreign cities from 51 countries and regions were invited to participate in the conference. During the conference, the "Urban Cultural Heritage Protection and Sustainable Development Forum" was held. The forum is composed of 4 sub-topics: "Development Complexity and Heritage Protection Challenges", "Heritage Protection and Urbanization Process", "Cultural Heritage: Driving Forces for Economic and Social Development", and "Establishing a New Type of Heritage Protection and Sustainable Development Alliance" . At the same time, representatives of Jingzhou City and 21 mayors and mayors from 12 countries including Nanjing, Xi'an, India, Daejeon, South Korea, Toledo, Spain and other 12 countries signed the "Nanjing Declaration on Urban Cultural Heritage Protection and Sustainable Development" and initiated the establishment "World Heritage Cities Alliance".

=== Seventh ===
The 7th World Historical and Cultural Cities Expo was held on October 23, 2016 in Nanjing Zhonghuamen Urn City, with the theme of "Diversity·Open·Creation". This year's famous city meeting is the one with the most participating organizations and the largest number of guests since it was held in 2004. Paris, France, Los Angeles, United States, Sparta, Greece, Yaroslavl, Russia, York, United Kingdom, Kraków, Poland, Malacca, Malaysia, Bloemfontein, South Africa, Lusaka, Zambia, Perth, Australia, etc. participated. During the period, the International Forum on Cultural Heritage and Innovation hosted by the Chinese People's Association for Friendship with Foreign Countries and co-organized by Nanjing Foreign Affairs Office and Nanjing University was also held. Guests from all walks of life at home and abroad were invited to discuss and exchange on the theme of "Cultural Heritage Protection and Innovation". At the press conference, the designer of the famous city club LOGO, the internationally renowned graphic design master and the dean of the Eindhoven School of Design in the Netherlands, Mr. Thomas, introduced the famous city club LOGO through video connection. The color of the logo of Mingchenghui was taken from these seven colors representing the city of Nanjing. At the same time, through communication with the female weavers of Yunjin brocade, the creative design direction was determined-"a piece of brocade wedding dress"

=== Eighth ===
The 8th World Historical and Cultural Cities Expo was held at Nanjing Jiangsu Grand Theater on May 25, 2018, with the theme of "mutual learning, sharing, and win-win". This year's famous city fair has four sections: "Museum Expo", "Literary Publishing", "Intangible Heritage Innovation", and "Urban Heritage" as the main body. Nearly 100 theme forums, cultural exhibitions, cultural performances, cultural and sports events have been held simultaneously Activity. More than 400 guests from 68 countries and regions around the world participated
