= Gao Guanwu =

- 高冠吾
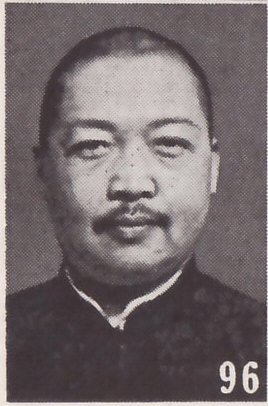
- Gao Guanwu as pictured in The Most Recent Biographies of Chinese Dignitaries
- Born: 1892; Chongming County, Jiangsu China
- Died: 1957 (aged 64–65); Shandong, China
- Education: Baoding Military Academy

Gao Guanwu (Chinese: 高冠吾; pinyin: Gāo Guānwú; Wade–Giles: Kao Kuan-wu; Hepburn: Ko Kango); (1892–1957) was a politician and military leader in the 1912–1949 Republic of China. He was an important politician in both the Reformed Government of the Republic of China and the Reorganized National Government of China. His former name was Yu (愈).

== Biography ==
Gao Guanwu was born in Chongming County, Jiangsu Province. After graduating from the Baoding Military Academy, he became a journalist with the newspaper Minquanbao (民權報). Later he returned to military service, and successively held the offices of Chief of Staff of the Guangzhou River Guard Headquarters, Manager of the Aviation Bureau of Guangdong, Chief of Staff of the Military Governor of Guizhou and other posts. Furthermore, he was appointed Vice-Commander of the 10th Army of the National Revolutionary Army commanded by Wang Tianpei (王天培). During the Northern Expedition Gao Guanwu served as the commander of the National Revolutionary Army garrison in Xuzhou.

In March 1938 he was recruited to join the collaborationist Reformed Government of the Republic of China. He successively held the offices of Vice-Minister for Security and Chief of Nanjing City Office. When later Nanjing City was transformed into Nanjing Special City, he was appointed Mayor.

After the creation of the Reorganized National Government of China headed by Wang Jingwei, Gao Guanwu continued as Mayor of Nanjing Special City. He was also appointed a member of the Central Political Committee, on which he served four terms. In June 1940 he became the chairman of the Jiangsu Provincial Government. In January 1943 he became Governor of Anhui Province. At the end of 1943 he was appointed Governor of Jiangxi Province.

After the surrender of Japan and the collapse of the Reorganized National Government of China, Gao Guanwu went into hiding to avoid arrest. His whereabouts during this period are mostly unknown, but he is known to have died in Shandong Province in 1957.

Political offices
Preceded by Ren Yuandao	Mayor of Nanjing Reformed Government of the Republic of China and Wang Jingwei Government; 1938–1940	Succeeded by Cai Pei
Preceded by Chen Zemin	Governor of Jiangsu (Wang Jingwei Government); 1940–1943	Succeeded by Li Shiqun
Preceded by Ni Daolang	Governor of Anhui (Wang Jingwei Government); January 1943 – December 1943	Succeeded by Luo Junqiang
Preceded by Deng Zuyu	Governor of Jiangxi (Wang Jingwei Government); 1943–1945	Succeeded by Huang Ziqiang
