= Xia Qifeng =

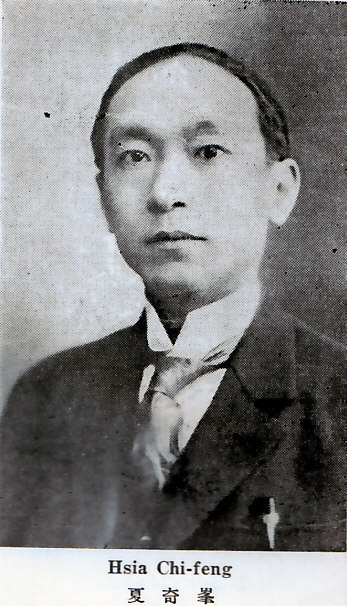
Xia Qifeng (Who's Who in China 4th ed., 1931)

Xia Qifeng (simplified Chinese: 夏奇峰; traditional Chinese: 夏奇峯; pinyin: Xià Qífēng; Wade–Giles: Hsia Ch'i-feng; 1888 – September 12, 1961) was a politician, diplomat and journalist in the Chinese Republic. He engaged in foreign affairs in the Beiyang Government and the Nationalist Government. In the end, he became an important politician during the Reformed Government of the Republic of China and the Reorganized National Government of China (Republic of China-Nanjing). His former name was Yun (雲). He was born in Taizhou, Jiangsu.

== Biography ==
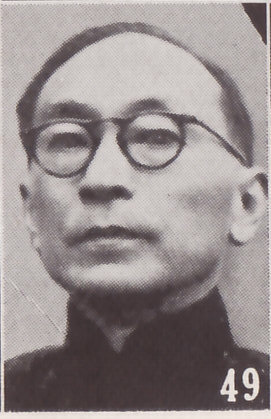
Xia Qifeng as pictured in The Most Recent Biographies of Chinese Dignitaries

In 1911 Xia Qifeng graduated from the Nanhui Middle School, and entered the Jiangsu High School (江蘇高等學堂). Having graduated from this High school in 1914, he went to France two year later in "Diligent work and Economical study" (勤工儉學). Until 1919 he engaged in translation.

Later he returned to China, was appointed labor and diplomatic editor of the Eastern Times in 1919 and assisted in the organization of the Returned Chinese Laborers Association, whose president he became. In 1921 Xia Qifeng went to Europe again as special correspondent for Eastern Times in France (Paris) and Switzerland. He also became unofficial publicity agent for the Chinese delegation to the League of Nations at Geneva 1923–28. In 1923 he was appointed a clerical employee of the League of Nations Secretariat. In 1928 he returned to China, and became a reporter of Daily Revolution (革命日報). From 1932 until 1934, he worked as a member of the Ministry for Foreign Affairs' Treaty Commission in the Nationalist Government.

In March 1938 Liang Hongzhi established the Reformed Government of the Republic of China. Xia Qifeng also participated in it, and was appointed Vice-Minister for the Interior. In September 1938 the Reformed Government and the Provisional Government of the Republic of China organized the United Council of the Republic of China (中華民國政府聯合委員會), Xia was appointed Deputy Manager of the General Office. In August 1939 he was appointed acting Minister for Foreign Affairs in the Reformed Government.

After the Wang Jingwei regime was established in March 1940, Xia Qifeng was appointed Chief of the Auditing Bureau of the Control Yuan (監察院審計部部長). In December he was elected Central Executive Member of the Kuomintang (Wang's clique). He also held the positions of Member of the committee for requisitioning French settlement in April 1943, and Member of the committee for abolition of extraterritorial rights in January 1945.

After the Wang Jingwei regime had collapsed, Xia Qifeng was arrested by Chiang Kai-shek's National Government in Shanghai. He was convicted of treason and surrender to the enemy (namely Hanjian) and sentenced to life imprisonment by the Suzhou High Court in October 1945. He was served his sentence in Shanghai. After the People's Republic of China had been established, his treatment did not change.

Xia Qifeng died in prison on September 12, 1961.

== Works ==
In 1931 Xia Qifeng and Li Shi (李實) translated Richard von Coudenhove-Kalergi's Pan-europa (Chinese Title was 歐洲合眾國), and published from Dadong Shuju (大東書局) in Shanghai.

== Notes ==
Political offices
| Preceded by Lian Yu | Minister of Foreign Affairs (Reformed Government of the Republic of China); August 1939 – March 1940 | Succeeded by dissolution of the Reformed Government |
| Preceded by office established | Chef of the Auditing Bureau (Wang Jingwei Government); 1940 – March 1945 | Succeeded by office abolished |
