= Luo Junqiang =

Chinese politician

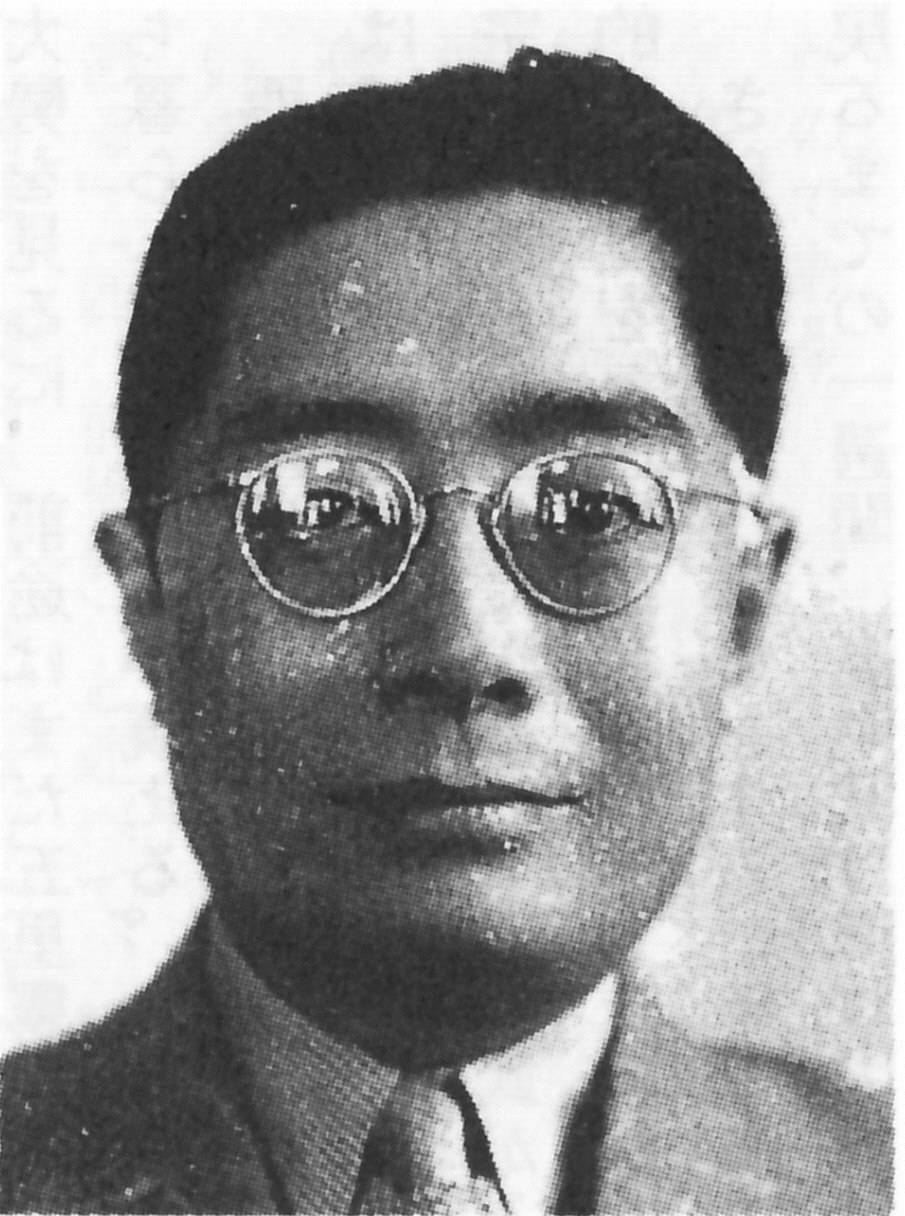
Luo c. 1945

Luo Junqiang (Chinese: 羅君強) (Wades-Giles: Luo Chün-ch'iang) (1902 – February 22, 1970) was a politician of the Republic of China. He was born in Xiangtan, Hunan. In 1922, at the age of 20, Luo joined the Chinese Communist Party, but later left it to join the Kuomintang. He served in the government of Wang Jingwei in Nanjing during the Second Sino-Japanese War. After the downfall of Wang's government in 1945, Luo was arrested and imprisoned. He died in custody in Shanghai.

== Bibliography ==
- 徐友春主編 (2007). 民国人物大辞典 増訂版|和書. 河北人民出版社. ISBN 978-7-202-03014-1.
- 劉傑 (2000). 漢奸裁判 対日協力者を襲った運命|和書. Chuokoron-Shinsha. ISBN 4-12-101544-4.
- 劉寿林ほか編 (1995). 民国職官年表|和書. Zhonghua Book Company. ISBN 7-101-01320-1.

| Preceded by Zhao Yusong | Minister of Justice (Wang Jingwei government); March 1942 – November 1943 | Succeeded by Zhang Yipeng |
| Preceded by Gao Guanwu | Governor of Anhui; December 1943 – December 1944 | Succeeded by Lin Bosheng |
