= Deng Zuyu =

Chinese politician

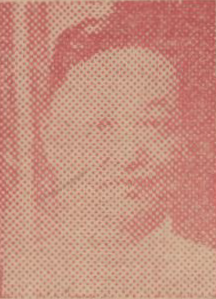
- Born: 1891; Jiangxi, Qing dynasty
- Occupation: Politician
- Known for: Republic of China politician convicted of treason

Deng Zuyu (Chinese: 鄧祖禹) (1891 – after 1948) was a Republic of China politician. He was born in Jiangxi. He served in the government of Wang Jingwei.

== Disappearance ==
After the downfall of Wang's government in August 1945. Deng was arrested and on October 8, 1946, was convicted of treason and sentenced to 15 years in prison. He appealed, and on February 28, 1948, his conviction and sentence was upheld. His ultimate fate is unknown.

Preceded by New office	Governor of Jiangxi; May–December 1943	Succeeded by Gao Guanwu

== Bibliography ==
- 徐友春主編 (2007). 民国人物大辞典 増訂版|和書. 河北人民出版社. ISBN 978-7-202-03014-1.
- 余子道ほか (2006). 汪偽政権全史 下巻|和書. Shanghai People's Press. ISBN 7-208-06486-5.
- 劉寿林ほか編 (1995). 民国職官年表|和書. Zhonghua Book Company. ISBN 7-101-01320-1.
- 最新支那要人伝|和書. Asahi Shimbun Company. 1941.

== See also ==
- List of people who disappeared
