= Lian Yu =

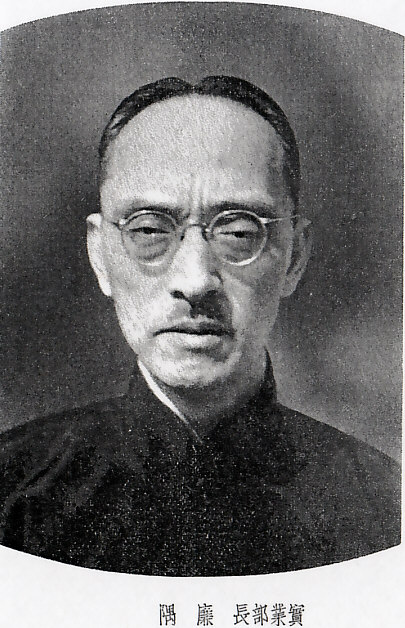
Lian Yu

Lian Yu (Chinese: 廉隅; pinyin: Lián Yú; Wade–Giles: Lien Yü; 1886 - 13 August 1972), art name Liqing (励清)was a diplomat, politician, judicial officer and lawyer in the Republic of China. He was an important politician during the Reformed Government of the Republic of China and Wang Jingwei regime (Republic of China-Nanjing).

== Early life ==
He was born in Wuxi, Jiangsu. Lian went to Japan where he acquired Bachelor of Laws at Kyoto Imperial University. Later he returned to China and got a position in the Ministry for Foreign Affairs of the Beijing Government.

== Career ==
=== Tibet ===
In 1905, Lian Yu was posted as the assistant amban to Tibet, to work with amban You Tai. The following year, You Tai was arrested on charges of corruption, and Lian became the chief amban. He remained in the post until the Xinhai revolution when all Chinese officials were expelled from Tibet.

=== Republic of China ===
In January 1913 he was appointed Chief of the Zhejiang High Court, but he resigned in November. The following March he was appointed Chief of the Zhili High Court which post he held until September 1920. He was transferred to acting Chief of the Henan High court soon, but resigned next month. Later he was an established lawyer in Tianjin.

In April 1938 Lian Yu was appointed Vice-Minister for Foreign Affairs in the Reformed Government of the Republic of China, but resigned in June. Next February, the Minister for Foreign Affairs Chen Lu (陳籙) was assassinated by secret agents of the Nationalist Government, so Lian served 4 months as acting Minister for Foreign Affairs. In same August he was transferred to the position of acting Minister for Business (Xia Qifeng succeeded him as acting Minister for Foreign Affairs).

In March 1940 the Reorganized National Government of China was established, Lian Yu was appointed a legislator (Member of the Legislative Yuan). In the end of the same year he was appointed the first Ambassador to Manchukuo. In February 1943 he was recalled (Chen Jicheng 陳濟成 succeeded him in this position) and became Ambassador standing at the Ministry. In May 1945 he was appointed as the last Ambassador to Japan.

After the Wang Jingwei regime collapsed, the Nationalist government decided to not prosecute him as a traitor as he wasn't viewed as having committed any crime against the country, even though he was ambassador to Japan under the collaborationist administration. He later left for Taiwan along with the Nationalist government. In Taiwan, he lived in difficult circumstances and sometimes helped the monks in Tamsui Longshan Temple in Tamsui. He died in Taipei on 13 August 1972 at the age of 86.

Political offices
Preceded by Chen Lu	Minister of Foreign Affairs (Reformed Government of the Republic of China); April 1939 – August 1939 (acting)	Succeeded by Xia Qifeng
Preceded by Wang Zihui	Minister of Commerce (Reformed Government of the Republic of China); August 1939 – March 1940	Succeeded by office abolished
Preceded by Cai Pei	Ambassador of the Wang Jingwei Government to the Empire of Japan; May 1945 – August 1945	Succeeded by dissolution of the Wang Jingwei Government
