= List of Nanjing art groups =

The following is a list of art groups in Nanjing, Jiangsu province of China:

- Jiangsu Province Kun Opera
- Jiangsu Jiangnan Theater
- Jiangsu Chinese Opera Institute
- Jiangsu Symphonic Orchestra
- Nanjing Acrobatic Company
- Nanjing Arts Institute Chinese Orchestra
- Nanjing Arts Institute Symphonic Orchestra
- Nanjing Arts Institute Experiment Dance Troupe
- Nanjing Chinese Orchestra
- Nanjing Dance Company
- Nanjing Secondary School Students Symphonic Orchestra
- Nanjing First High School Symphonic Band
- Nanjing Youth and Adolescence Dance Troupe
- Nanjing Youth Dance Troupe
- Nanjing Peking Opera Troupe
- Nanjing University Chinese Orchestra
- Nanjing University Symphonic Orchestra
- Nanjing University of Science and Technology Wind Orchestra
- Nanjing Xiaobaihe Art Troupe
- Nanjing Xiaohonghua Art Troupe (Nanjing Primary School of Art)
- Qianxian Dance Troupe
- Qianxian Theater
