= Zhou Xuechang =

Chinese politician

- 周學昌
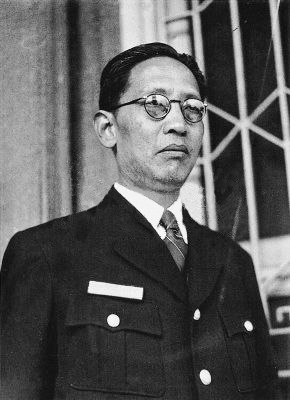
- Born: March 19, 1898; Anxin, Zhili Province China
- Died: November 27, 1952 (aged 54); Shanghai, China

Zhou Xuechang (simplified Chinese: 周学昌; traditional Chinese: 周學昌; pinyin: Zhōu Xuéchāng; Wade–Giles: Chou Hsüeh-ch'ang; Hepburn: Shu Gakushō; March 19, 1898 – November 27, 1952) was a politician in the Republic of China. He was an important figure during the Reorganized National Government of China. His courtesy name was Zhihou (芝侯).

== Biography ==
Zhou was born in Anxin, Zhili (Now Hebei). He graduated from Peking University and Guangdong University. In 1925, he became an instructor at the Whampoa Military Academy. Zhou Xuechang successively held the positions of Political Chief of the 2nd Division in the East Route Army of the Northern Expedition, Chairman of the Kuomintang's Central Committee and Leading Member of the Beiping Branch of the Kuomintang, etc. In 1931, he was appointed to the Chief of the Bureau for Education of the Beiping City Government. In October 1932, he was appointed to the Committee of the Shanxi Provincial Government. In 1938, he became Member of the Preparatory committee for Xikang Province.

In August 1939, Zhou Xuechang joined Wang Jingwei in creating the collaborationist Reorganized National Government of China, and was appointed Member of the Kuomintang's Central Committee (Wang clique). During the following September, he was appointed Superintendent of Education of the Training Team for Central Political Affairs. In December 1941, he was promoted to Mayor of the Nanjing Special City, and stayed on this position until the Wang Jingwei regime collapsed.

After the Reorganized National Government of China collapsed, on August 17, 1945, the former Director of the Taxation Police Bureau (稅警局隊長) Zhou Gao (周鎬), who was a subordinate of Zhou Fohai, began arresting important members of the former government. However, the Vice-Chief of Staff of the China Expeditionary Army, Takeo Imai (今井武夫) urged that Zhou Gao to release his captives, so Zhou Xuechang was also set free.

On September 26 the same year, Zhou Xuechang was arrested by Chiang Kai-shek's National Government. On October 19, 1945, he was convicted of treason and surrender to the enemy and was sentenced to death. In May 1947, his sentence was confirmed by the higher court. However, the Chinese Civil War occurred before his sentence could be carried out, and in January 1949, he was transferred to the Tilanqiao Prison in Shanghai. After the People's Republic of China had been established, his treatment did not change, and he remained imprisoned until his death of illness on November 27, 1952.

== Footnotes ==
- Xu Youchun (徐友春) (main ed.) (2007). Unabridged Biographical Dictionary of the Republic, Revised and Enlarged Version (民国人物大辞典 增订版). Hebei People's Press (Hebei Renmin Chubanshe; 河北人民出版社). ISBN 978-7-202-03014-1.
- Zheng Renjia (鄭仁佳), "The biographical sketch of Zhou Xuechang" (周學昌小傳) Biographical Writings (傳記文學) Website (requires a Traditional Chinese font)
- Yu Zidao (余子道) (etc.) (2006). The Complete History of Wang's Fake Regime (汪伪政权全史). Shanghai People's Press (Shanghai Renmin Chubanshe; 上海人民出版社). ISBN 7-208-06486-5.
- Liu Jie (劉傑) (2000). The Trial for Hanjians (漢奸裁判). Chuokoron-Shinsha. ISBN 978-4-12-101544-0.
- Liu Shoulin (刘寿林) (etc.ed.) (1995). The Chronological Table of the Republic's Officer (民国职官年表). Zhonghua Book Company (Zhonghua Shuju; 中华书局). ISBN 7-101-01320-1.

Political offices
Preceded by Cai Pei	Mayor of Nanjing Special City (Wang Jingwei Government); 1942–1945	Succeeded by dissolution of the Wang Jingwei Government
