= 1441 Yangtze flood =

Flood during Ming dynasty China

The 1441 Yangtze flood was a natural disaster affecting the area around Nanjing, China, during the Ming dynasty.

The flood occurred in the late autumn and broke the river's banks repeatedly. The situation was a major emergency not only for Nanjing and the surrounding area but also for the northern capital Beijing, which depended upon grain shipments from the Yangtze valley. The southern entrance to the Grand Canal was at Yangzhou near Nanjing and had to be closed during heavy flooding.
