= Cai Pei =

Chinese diplomat and politician (1884–1960)

- 蔡培
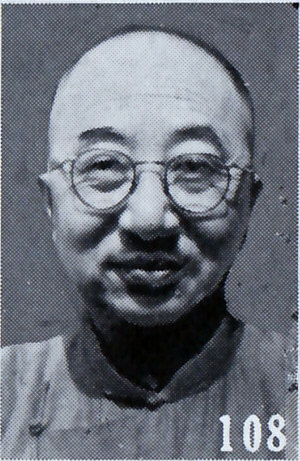
- Cai Pei as pictured in The Most Recent Biographies of Chinese Dignitaries
- Born: 1884; Wuxi, Jiangsu, China
- Died: 1960 (aged 75–76); Shanghai, China
- Education: Waseda University

Cai Pei (Chinese: 蔡培; pinyin: Cài Péi; Wade–Giles: Ts'ai P'ei; Hepburn: Sai Bai; 1884–1960) was a diplomat and politician in the pre-World War II Republic of China. He held a number of important posts during the collaborationist Reorganized National Government of China, and successively held the positions of Mayor of Nanjing Special City and Ambassador to Japan. His courtesy name was Ziping (子平).

== Biography ==
Cai Pei was born in Wuxi, Jiangsu Province. He went to study to Japan and graduated from the Department of Law of Waseda University. After his return to China, together with Liu Yazi he helped establish the literary and poetry society Nanshe. He also was elected Member of the Legislative Yuan. In January 1928 Cai was appointed legislative secretary of the Ministry for Transportation under the Nationalist Government. In January 1930 he was promoted to Chief of the Aviation Bureau of the Ministry for Transportation. In 1935 he was transferred to the position of Chief of the Civil Administration Bureau of the Ministry of the Interior.

In March 1940, when the Reorganized National Government of China led by Wang Jingwei was established, Cai Pei was appointed Policy Affairs Vice-Minister for Commerce and Industry. In June he accepted the post of Mayor of Nanjing Special City. In December he assumed the office of Chairman of the Rationing Management Commission. Afterwards he served in the Political Affairs Committee of the Executive Yuan. In March 1943 he was appointed Ambassador to the Empire of Japan. After his return to Nanjing in May 1945, he was appointed a Member of the National Government.

After the surrender of Japan and collapse of the collaborationist Reorganized National Government of China, Cai Pei was arrested as a hanjian on orders of Chiang Kai-shek's National Government in September 1945. The following July he was charged with promoting "Sino-Japanese friendship" and sentenced to death by the Shanghai High Court. After appealing to the Supreme Court, his sentence was commuted to life imprisonment in November 1947.

Cai Pei served his sentence in Shanghai at the Tilanqiao Prison. After the People's Republic of China was established, his situation remained unchanged. In August 1956, following deterioration in his health condition, he was allowed to receive medical treatment. Cai Pei died in prison in 1960.

Political offices
| Preceded by Gao Guanwu | Mayor of Nanjing Special City (Wang Jingwei Government); 1940–1942 | Succeeded by Zhou Xuechang |
| Preceded by Xu Liang | Ambassador of the Wang Jingwei Government to the Empire of Japan; 1943–1945 | Succeeded by Lian Yu |
