= City Wall of Nanjing =

Wall built around the city of Nanjing, China

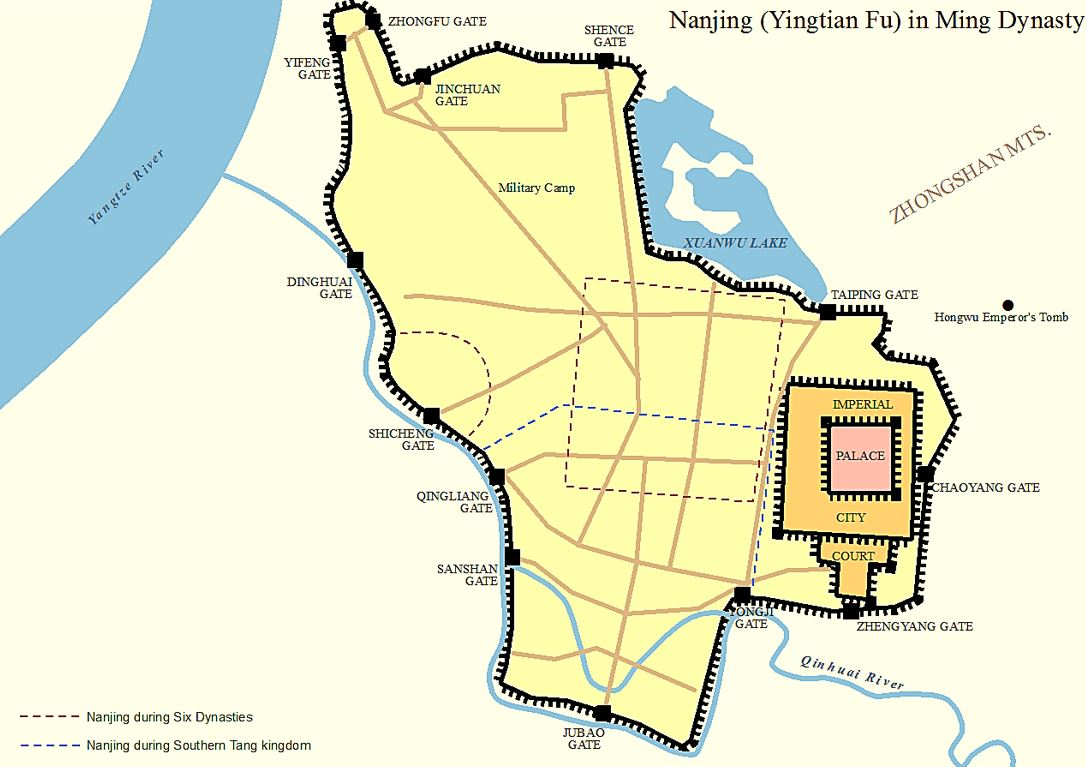
Nanjing and its walls during Ming Dynasty

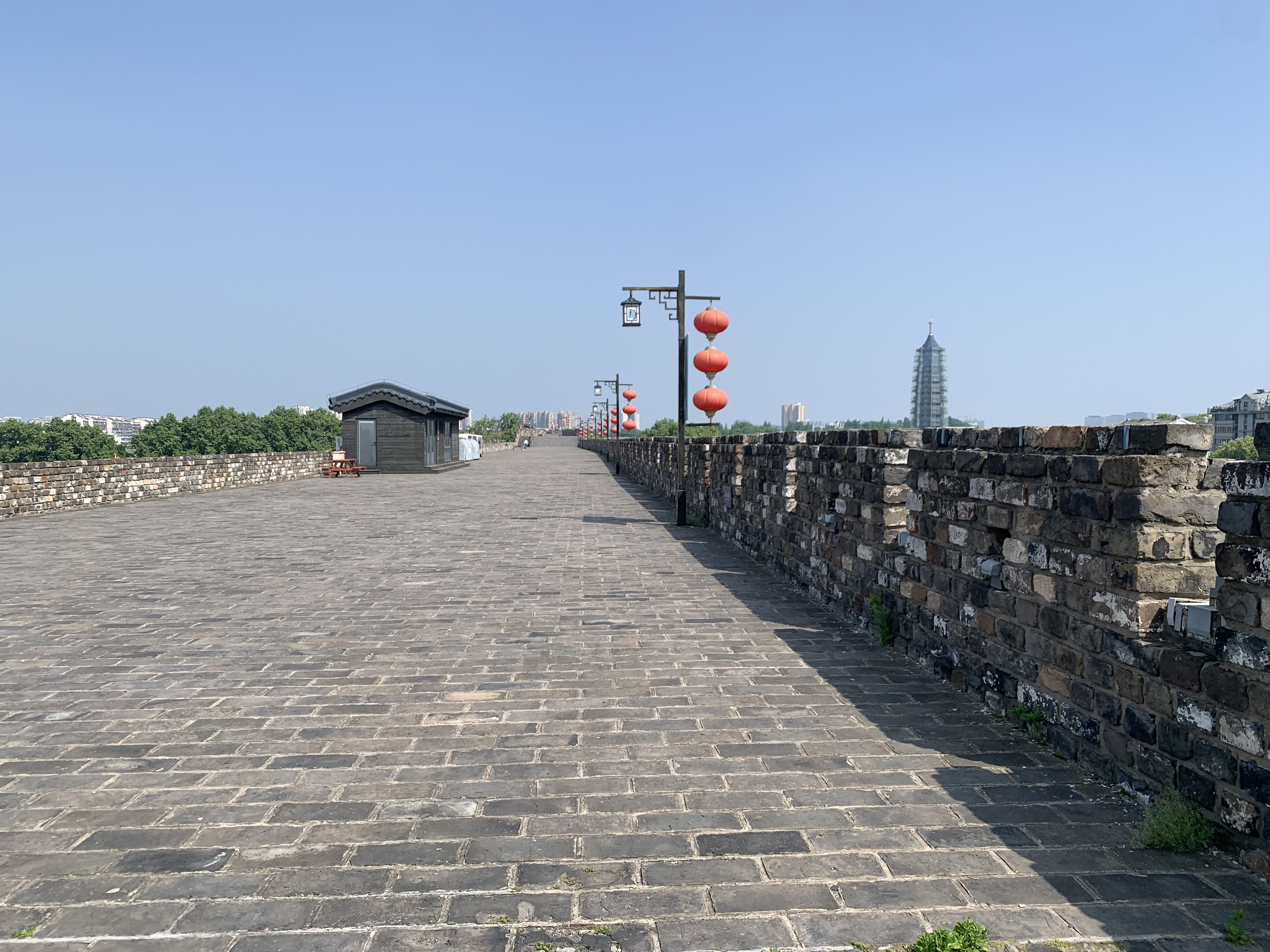
A southern section of the Nanjing City Wall, the reconstructed Porcelain Tower of Nanjing is visible in the background

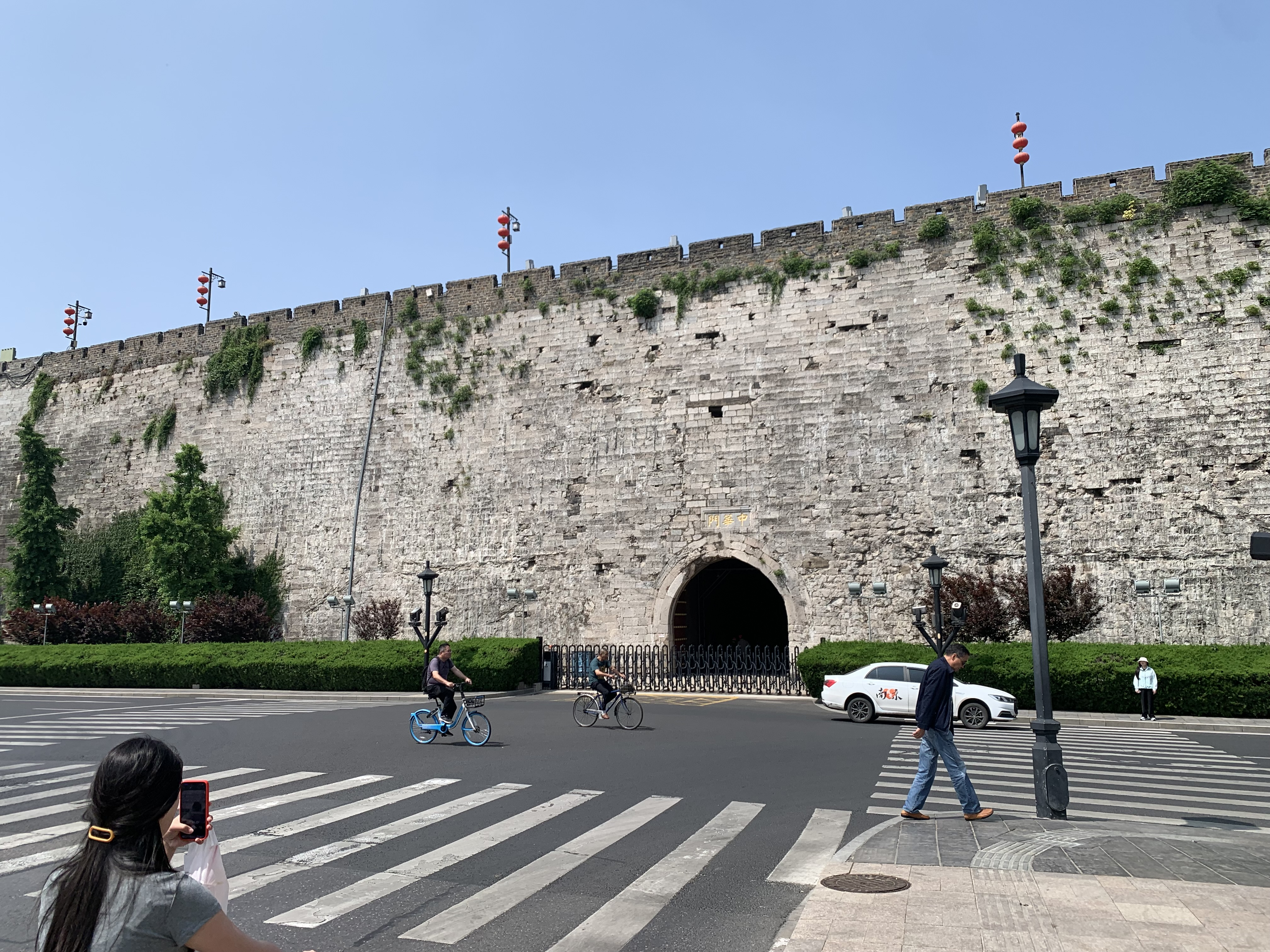
Zhonghua Gate in the southern section of the City Wall

The City Wall of Nanjing was designed by the Hongwu Emperor (1328–1398) after he founded the Ming Dynasty (1368–1644) and established Nanjing as the capital in 1368. To consolidate his sovereignty and defend the city against coastal pirates, he adopted the suggestion of his advisor Zhu Sheng to build a higher city wall. The construction of the wall required the labor of 200,000 workers over twenty-one years to complete. Around 7 million cubic meters (250×10^{6} ft^{3}) of earth were shifted to create one of the largest city walls ever constructed in China. The enclosed Nanjing City is about 55 square kilometers.

== History ==
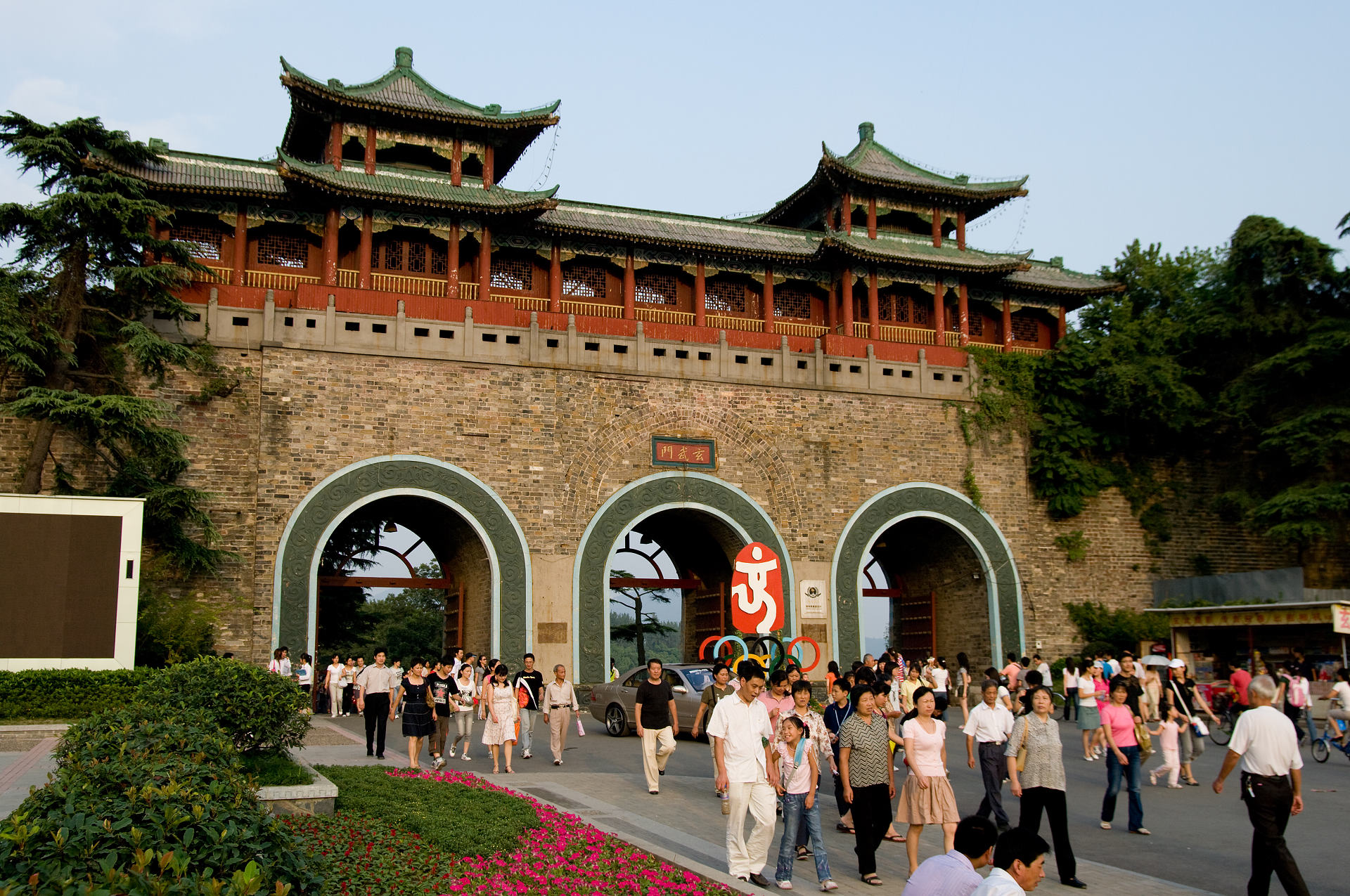
The Xuanwu Gate, one of the gates of the city wall

The first Ming emperor was proclaimed in 1368; much preparation was done prior to this to have an imperial city and all the imperial trappings ready. The name of the city was changed again to Yingtianfu (responding to heaven). A "new city" was built to the east of the old one to be used as a new palace or "forbidden" city. This city was laid out in much the same pattern as Beijing; indeed Nanjing's was the pattern for Beijing's Forbidden City.

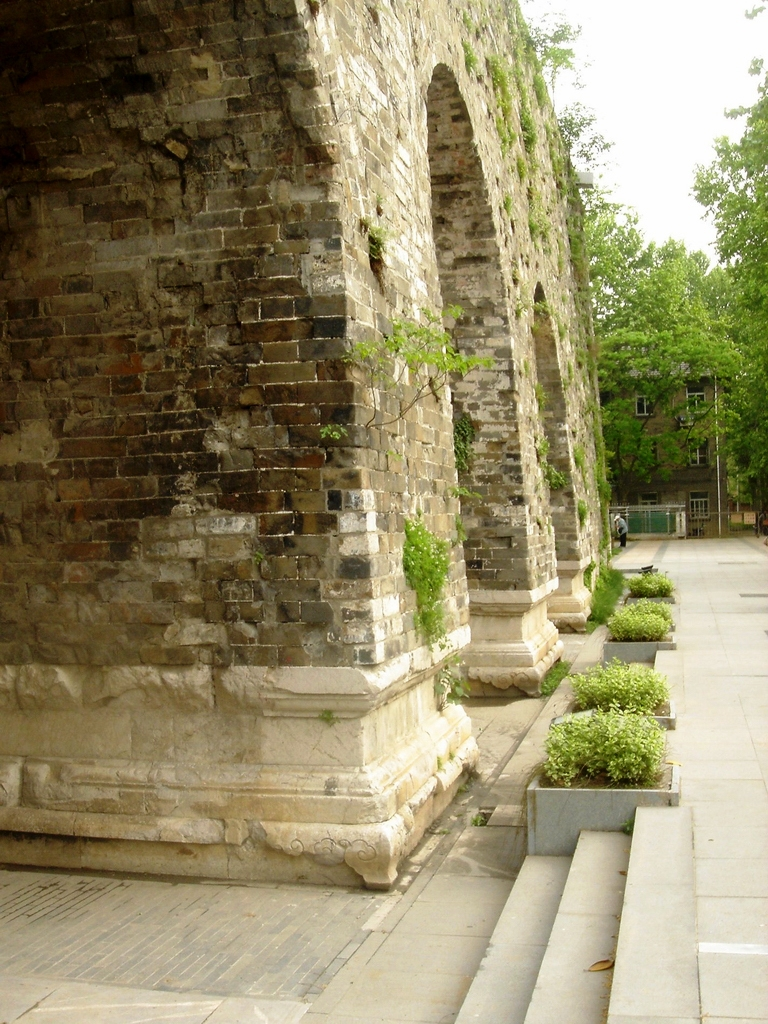
The Donghua Gate

In expanding the walls, it appears the Hongwu Emperor intended initially to simply add a bulge to the existing walls and encompass the New City to the east. The main north gate would have been the Drum Tower. However, it was decided to bring Lion Hill to the northwest into the city defenses for strategic reasons, and this almost doubled the area the walls would encompass. In addition to the surviving walls of stone and brick, an outwall was built along the river and to the south as an additional defensive measure. Old maps show that there were close to twenty gates in this rammed earth wall. This outwall is long gone, but the names of the gates survive as local place names. Part of the wall on the south shore of Xuanwu Lake was built on the foundations of the old Stone City walls from the Six Dynasties period, and reused many of the bricks from that old wall.

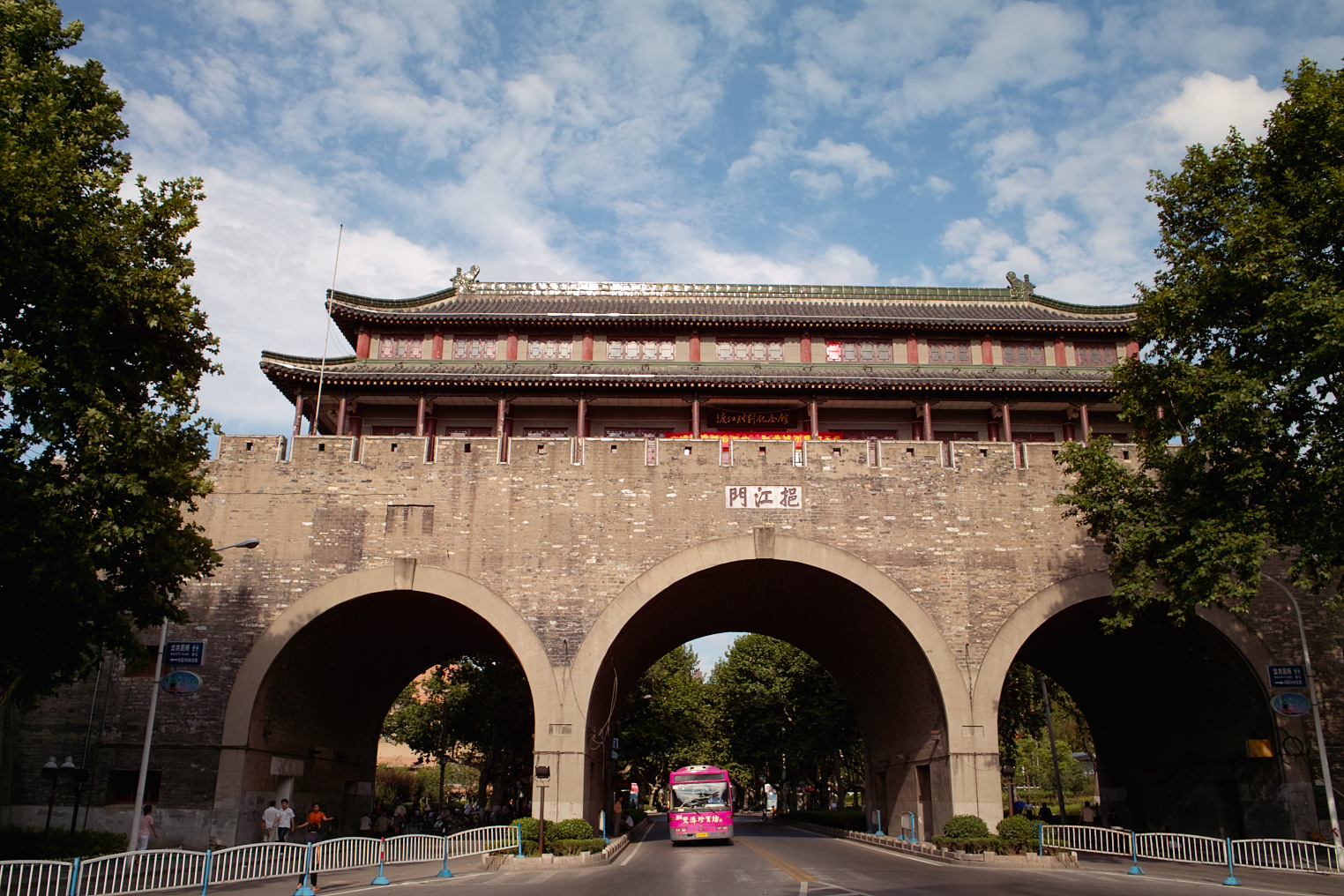
The Yijiang Gate

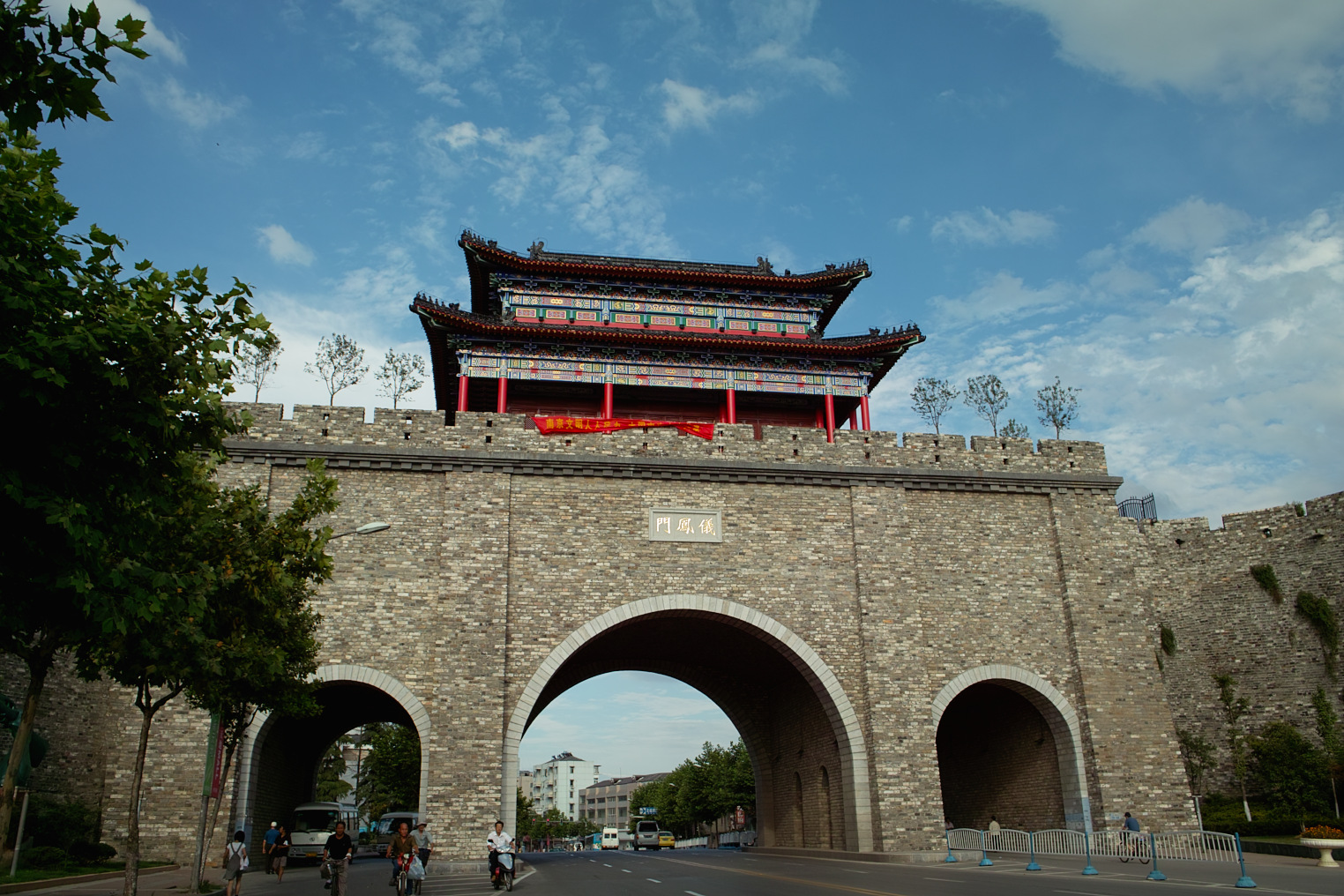
The Yifeng Gate

Originally, thirteen gates were built through Nanjing's walls, but this number had grown to eighteen by the end of the Qing dynasty. Of the thirteen original gates, only Zhonghua Gate in the south, originally known as Jubao Gate, and Heping Gate in the north, originally called Shenci Gate, are still standing. Heping Gate is closed to the public as it is still used as an army barracks. Parts of other gates survive or have been partially reconstructed. The remains of a west gate, Hanzhongmen, originally called Shichengmen, stand in the middle of a plaza. These walls are part of the last of a series of three or four courtyards that made up the gate complex. During the Qing dynasty three more gates were added, including an entrance to Xuanwu Lake from the west built in 1910. Yijiang Gate on North Zhongshan Road was built in 1921, as was the major entrance to the city during Republican times when most visitors to the city arrived by boat at the docks just to the west.

== Construction ==
Different from ancient city walls in Beijing and Xi'an, its design and construction was unique and changed the old ways of equilibrium and symmetry. The construction concentrated on military defenses because the city was at the foot of a mountain—a natural barrier to control the commanding elevation with the river as its natural city moat. Because of this, the city itself became strategically situated, if not inaccessible.

The wall belonged to a military defensive system too. The difference was that it adopted a winding, free style, based on the city's complicated topography. Construction of the Beijing and the Xi'an city walls was in the ancient style of square or rectangular design. When it was built by the second son of Emperor Zhu Yuanzhang, the 12-kilometer-long Xi'an city wall became the seat of local government. It could not match the scale of the capital Nanjing at that time.

== Today ==
Today the 600-year-old city wall of Nanjing still stands. Experts from Nanjing Cultural Relic Bureau say most of the foundations use granite, rectangle stones or limestone. The walls were packed layer by layer with broken bricks, gravel and yellow earth. All the brickwork joints were poured with mixed lime, water in which glutinous rice had been cooked, and tung oil because the coagulated mixture was very strong. That is why the city wall has stood for a long time. On top of the outer wall were 13,616 crenellations, or battlements, for defenders of the city to observe the enemy or dodge arrows. Opposite it was the parapet wall used as a balustrade to keep the defenders and horses safe. Standing on the wall, you will see tall ancient trees under your feet. Aside the top wall there are stone sluices to drain rain and near the wall's foundation there are further outlets. The ancient city wall was listed as a key cultural relic under state protection in 1988.

It was the longest city wall in the world and the city enclosed by it remained the world's largest until the 17th century.

== Gallery ==
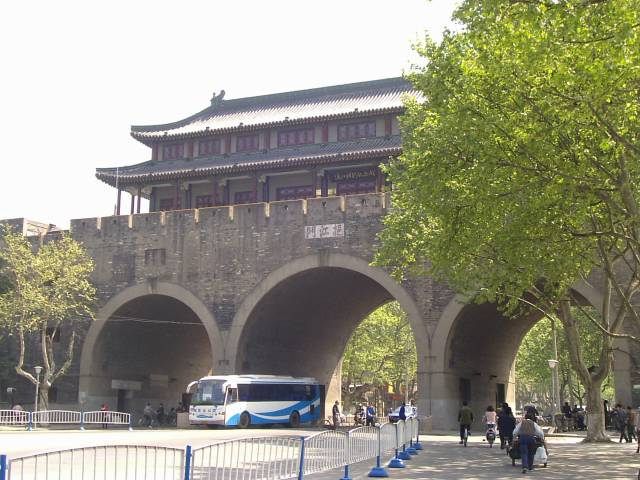
The Yijiang Gate

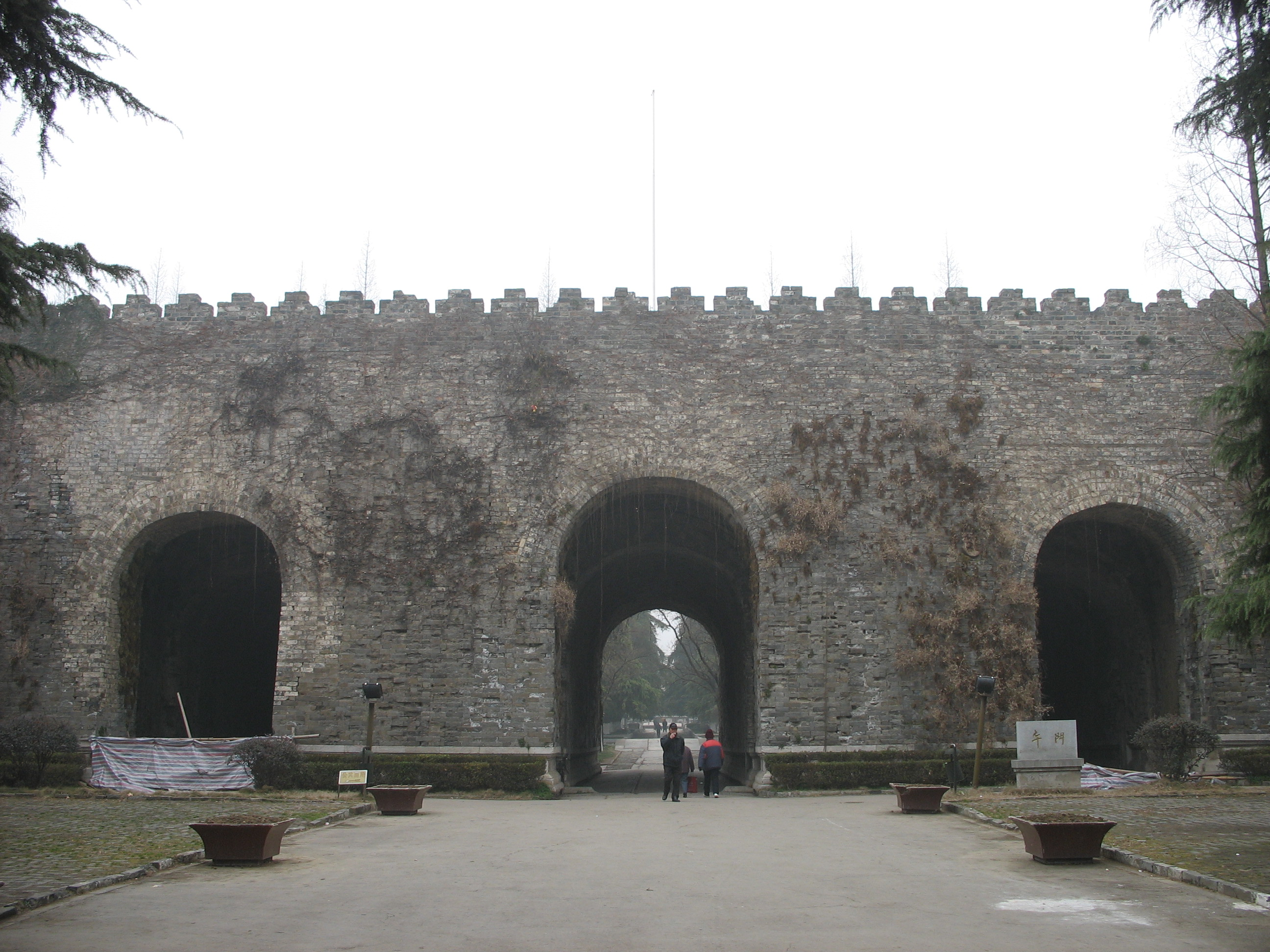
The Wu Gate

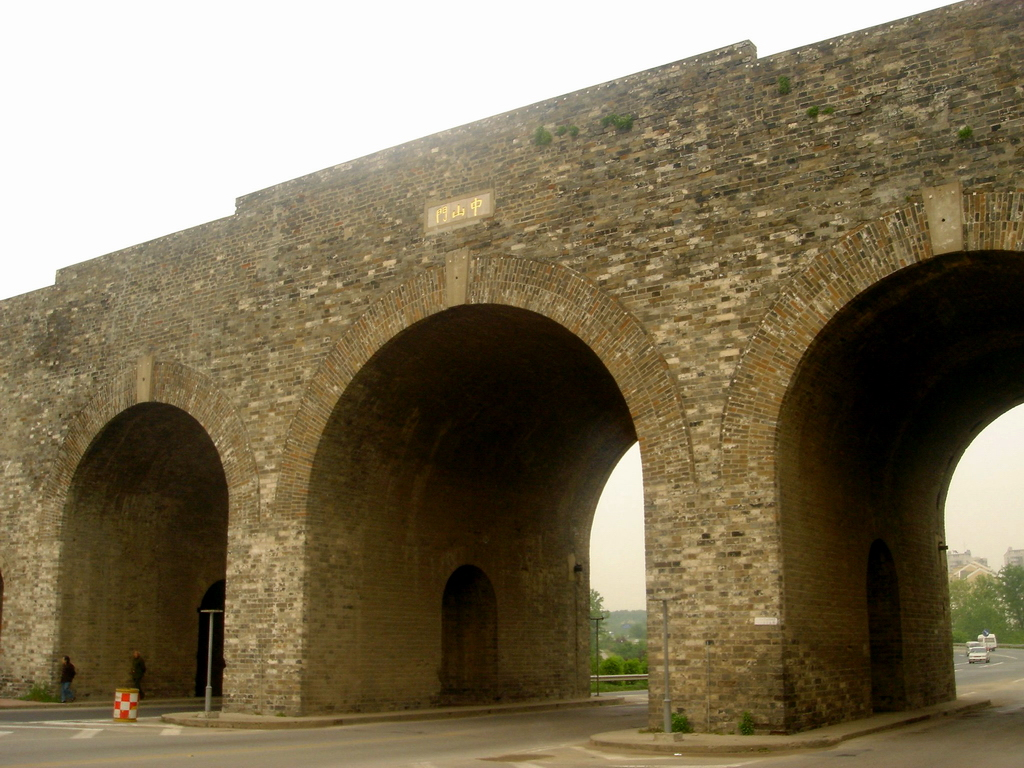
The Zhongshan Gate

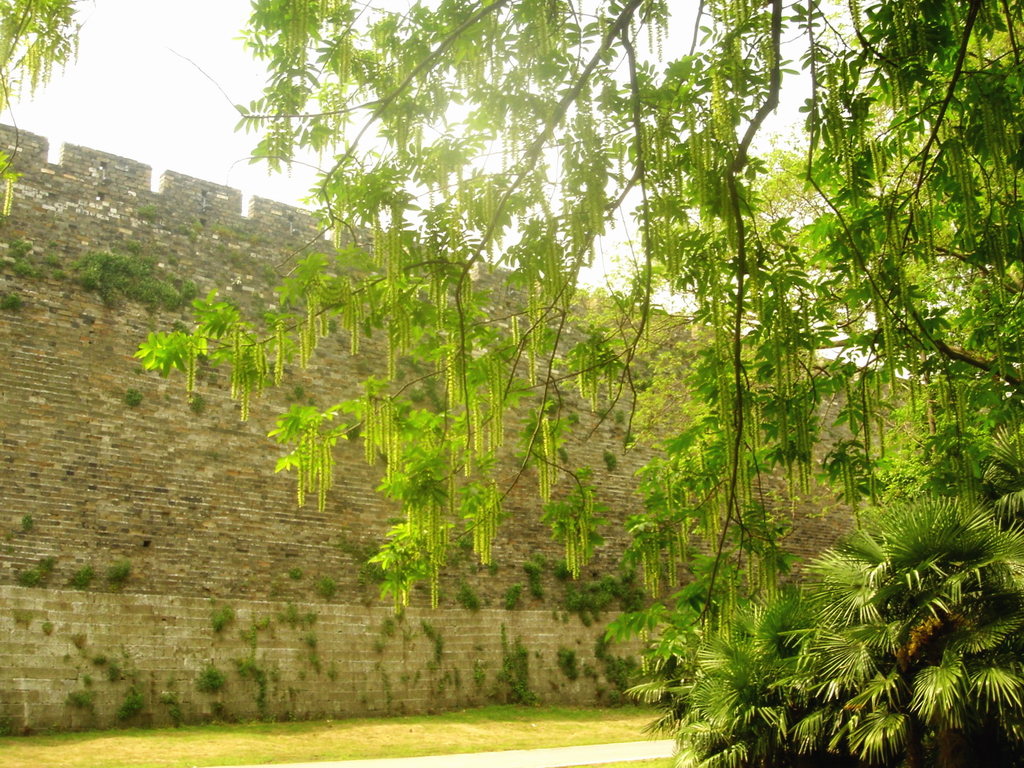
A section of the wall near the Xuanwu Lake

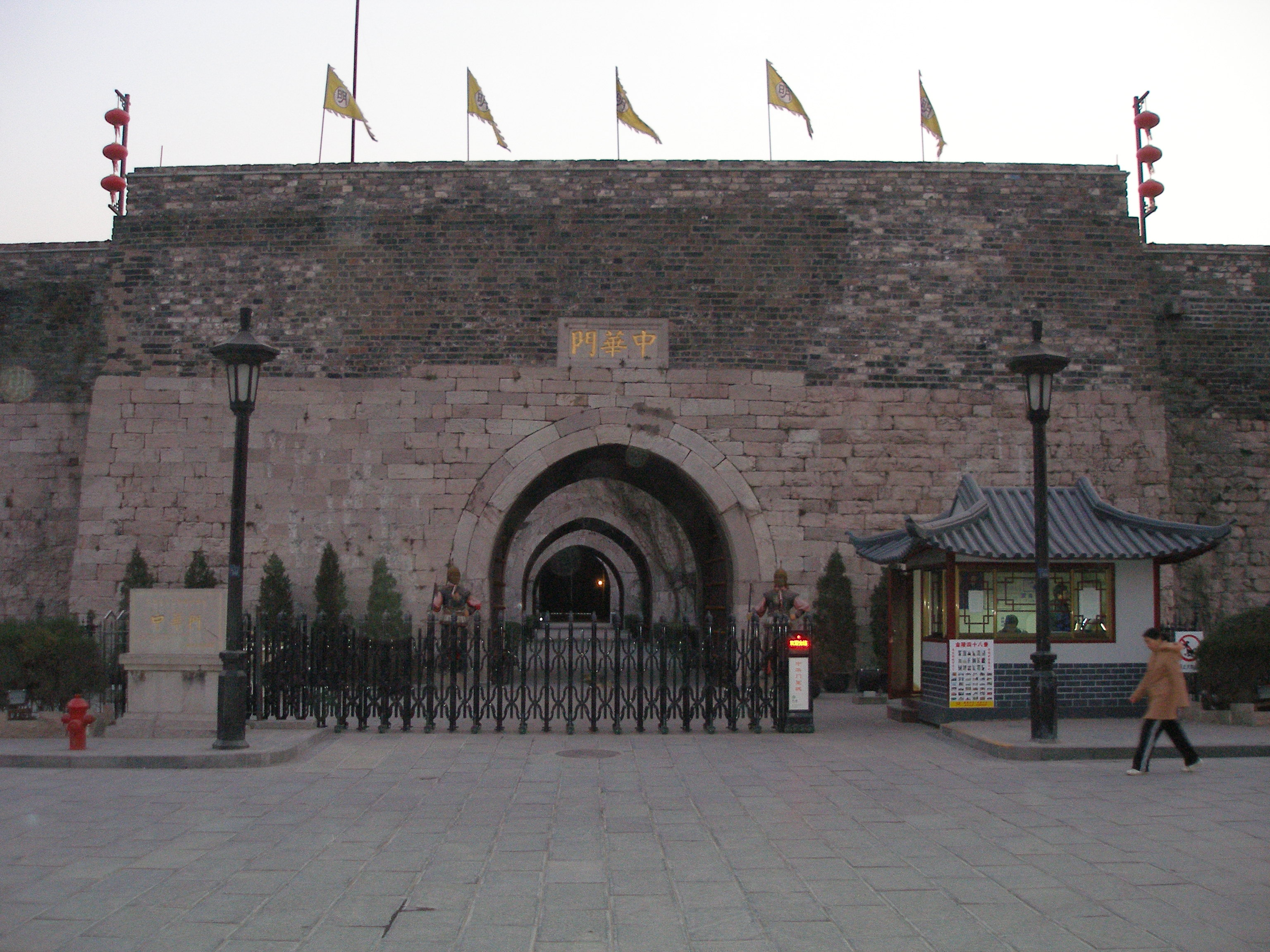
The Zhonghua Gate

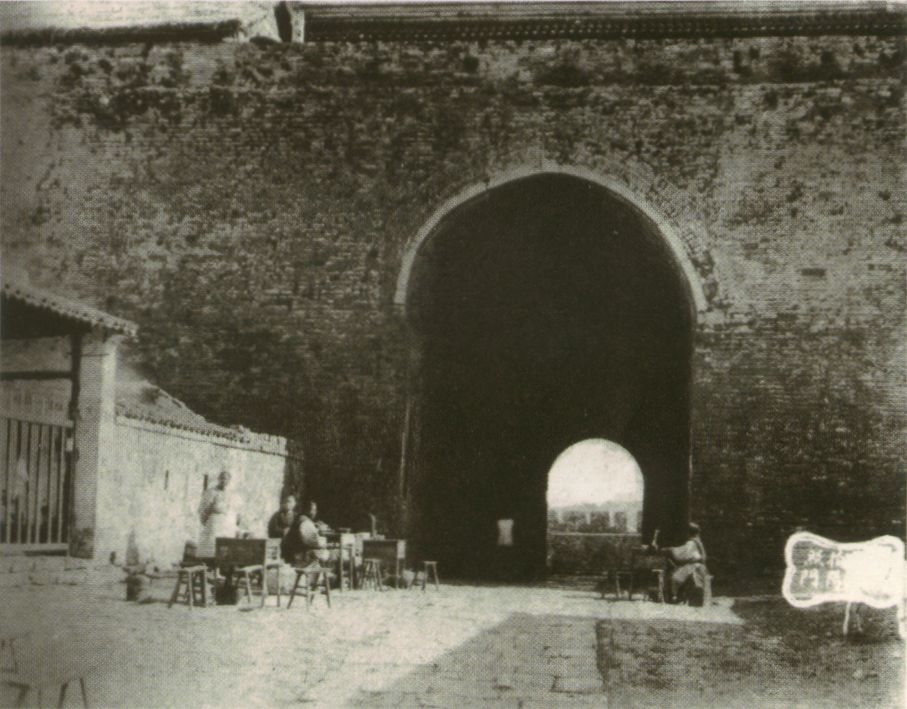
The Chaoyang Gate

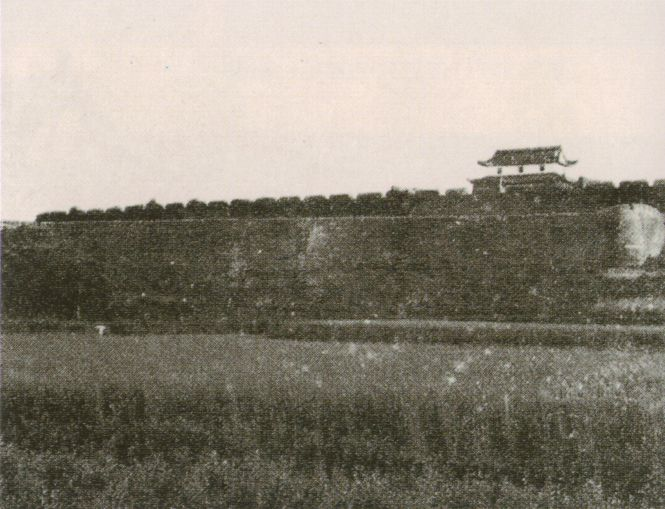
The Shence Gate

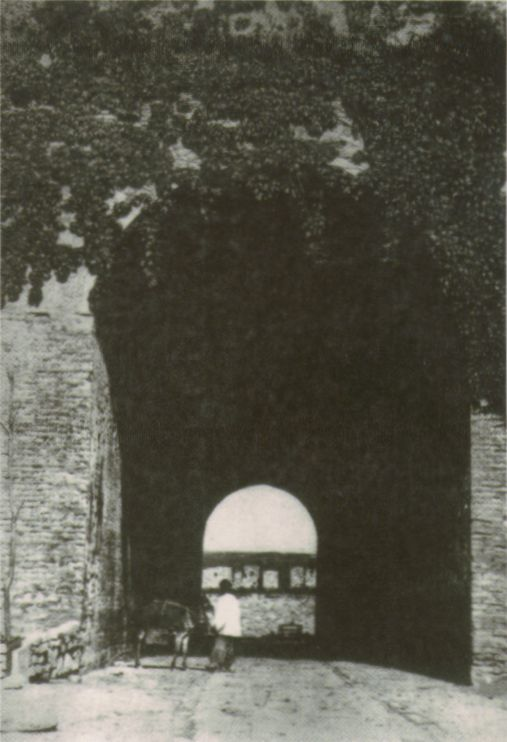
The Zhengyang Gate

== See also ==
- Nanjing City
- Gate of China, Nanjing
- Chinese city wall
