= Zhonghua Gate, Nanjing =

Southern gateway to the city of Nanjing

Coordinates: 32°0′52.87″N 118°46′35.35″E

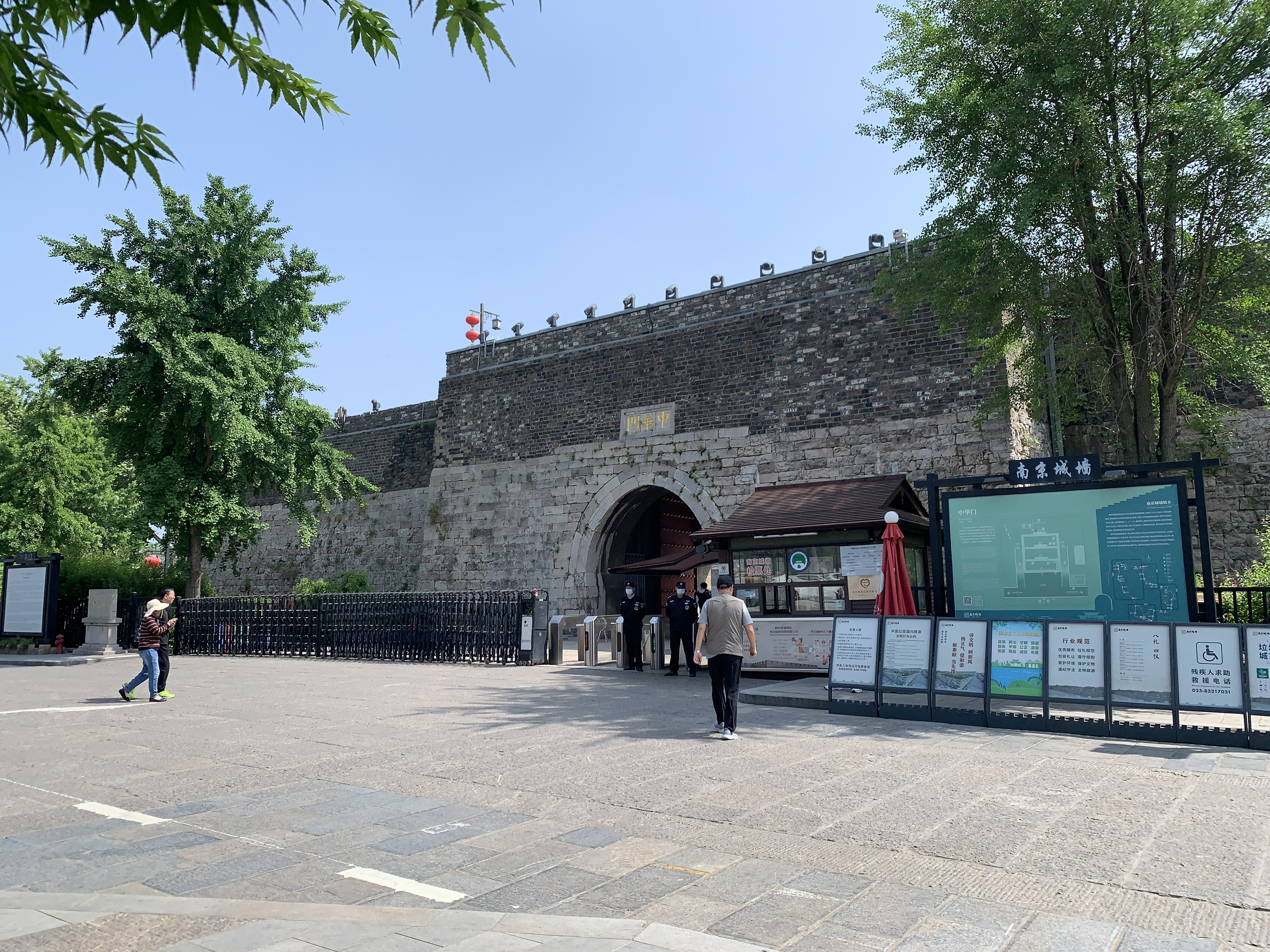
Zhonghua Gate as of 2024

The Zhonghua Gate (traditional Chinese: 中華門; simplified Chinese: 中华门; pinyin: Zhōnghuámén) is a gate and defensive complex on the city wall of Nanjing, China. This is the southern gate of Nanjing city. It is renowned as the city gate with one of the most complex and well preserved structures in the world.

== History ==
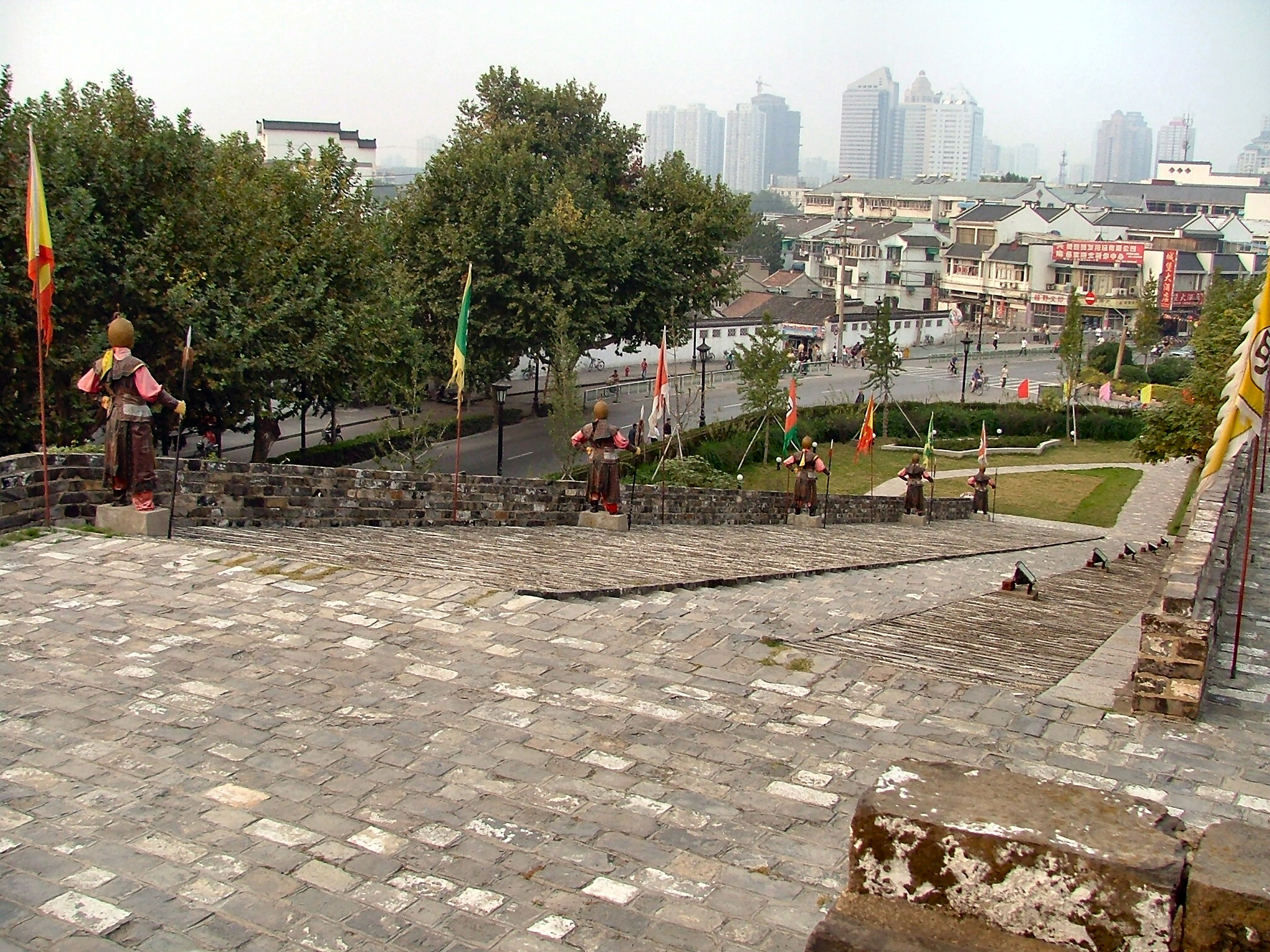
On each side of the gate, large ramps accommodate running soldiers on horse back to the top.

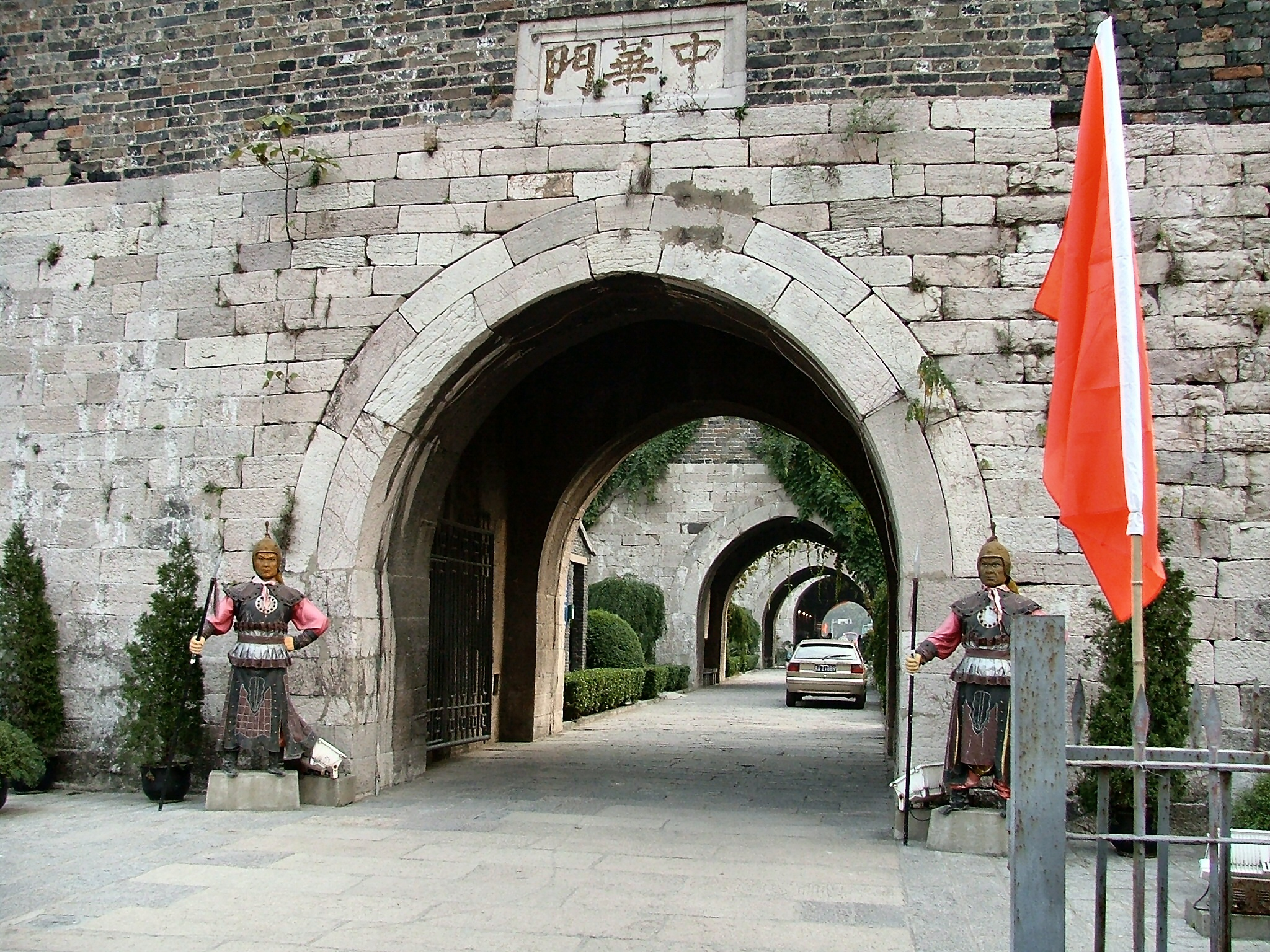
Main entrance.

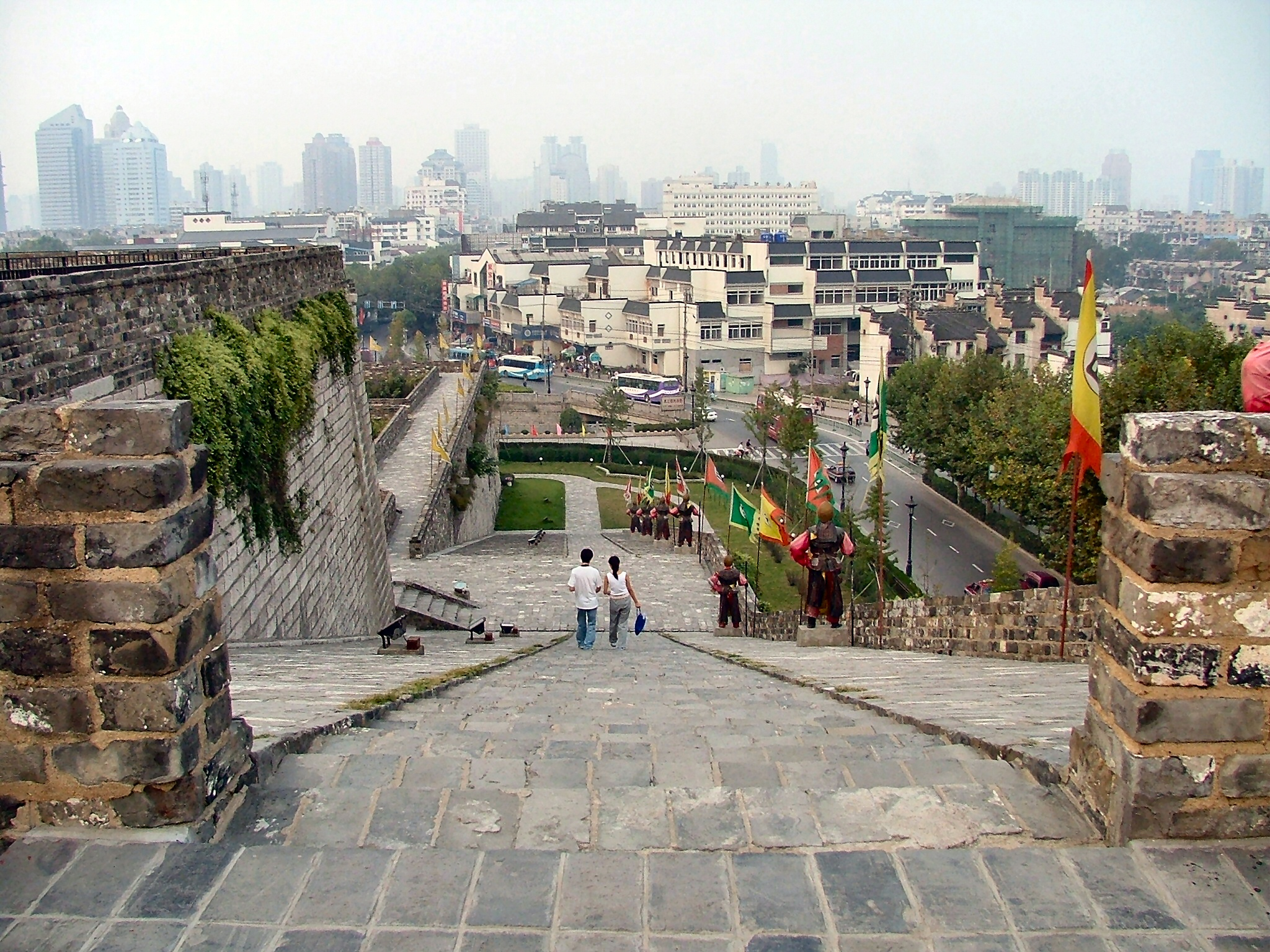
On each side of the gate, large ramps accommodate running soldiers on horse back to the top.

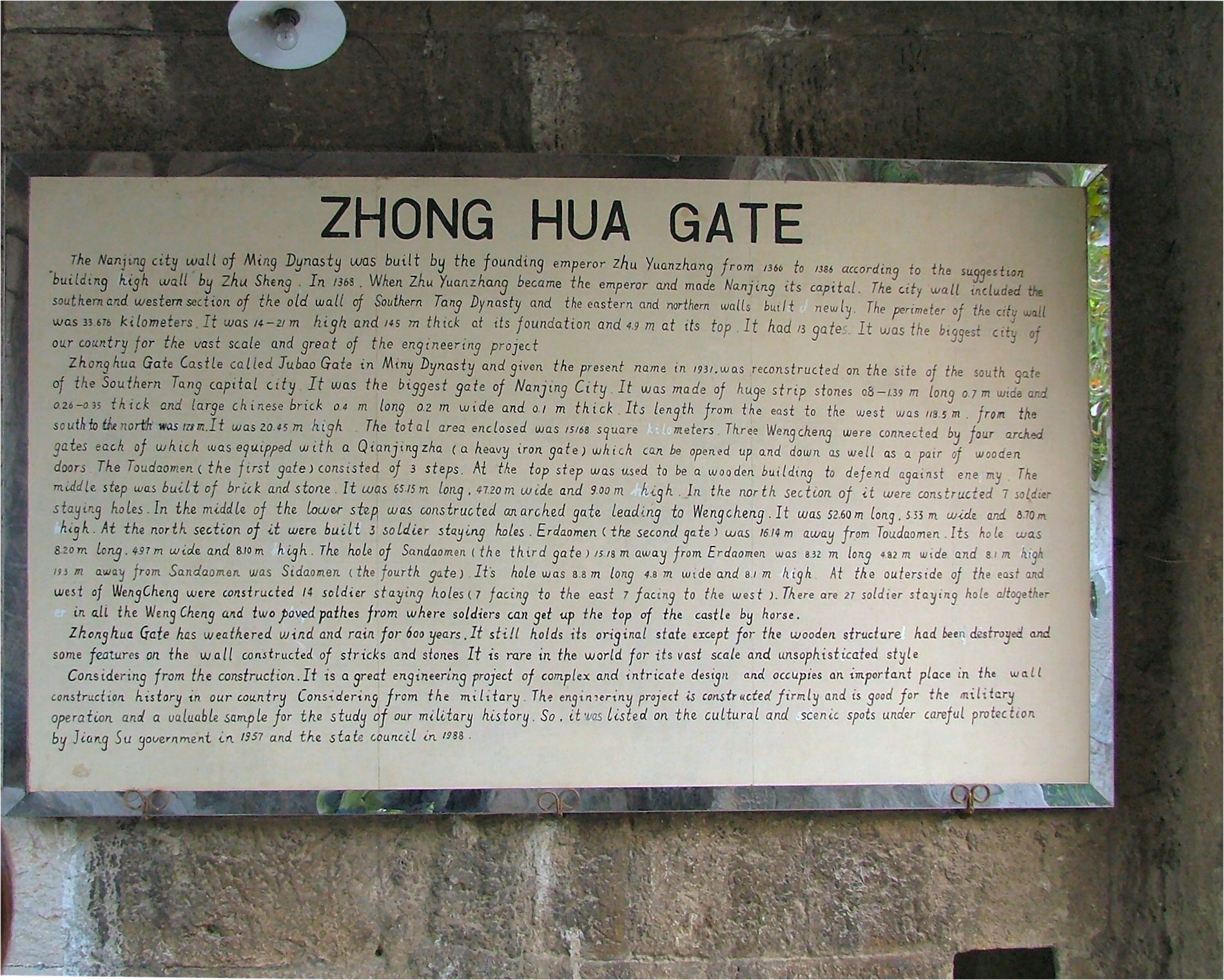
Sign fixed on the wall next to the gate entrance.

The city wall of Nanjing was built from 1360 to 1386 under the founder of the Ming dynasty, the Hongwu Emperor Zhu Yuanzhang. In 1368, Zhu Yuanzhang was crowned Emperor, and made Nanjing his capital. The southern and eastern sections of the old city wall from the Tang dynasty were incorporated into the new wall. The northern and eastern sections were built afresh. The city wall was 33.676 kilometres long. It was 14–21 m high; 14.5m thick at its base, and 4.9m thick at the top. Thirteen gates were built into the wall, and the enclosed area was the largest of any walled city in China.

The gate today known as Zhonghua Gate was then known as Jubao Gate (traditional Chinese: 聚寶門; simplified Chinese: 聚宝门; pinyin: Jùbǎo Mén; lit. 'Gathering Treasure Gate'). It was built on the site of the south gate of the capital city of the Southern Tang dynasty. It was the largest among the thirteen gates of Nanjing. In 1931, after the Republic of China government established Nanjing as its capital, the gate was renamed to Zhonghua Gate. In one sense, this reflects the triumph of the southern factions led by Chiang Kai-shek over the northern factions of the Beiyang government in Beijing, who had named the southern (main) gate of Beijing "Gate of China" to signify its status as "gate of the nation".

== Layout ==
The gate was made of huge strip stones 0.8 – 1.39 m long, 0.7 m wide and 0.26-0.35 thick and large Chinese brick 0.4 m long 0.2 m wide and 0.1 m thick.

Its dimensions were 118.5 m from east to west, and 128 m from south to north. The ramparts were 20.45 m high. The total area enclosed was 15,168 square meters. Three barbicans were connected by four arched gates, each of which was equipped with a Qianjinzha (traditional Chinese: 千金閘; simplified Chinese: 千金闸; pinyin: Qiānjīn Zhá; lit. 'very heavy gate') which could be opened up and down, as well as a pair of wooden doors. The Toudaomen (traditional Chinese: 頭道門; simplified Chinese: 头道门; pinyin: Tóudào Mén; lit. 'first gate') consisted of 3 steps.

At the top step, there used to be a wooden building to defend against the enemy. The middle step was built of brick and stone. It was 65.15 m long, 47.20 m wide and 9.00 m high. In the north section of it were constructed 7 soldier staying holes. In the middle of the lower step was constructed an arched gate leading to barbican. It was 52.60 m long, 5.35 m wide and 8.7 m high. At the north section of it were built 3 soldier staying holes. Erdaomen (the second gate) was 16.14 m away from Toudaomen. Its hole was 8.20 m long, 4.97 m wide and 8.10 m high. The hole of Sandaomen (the third gate) 15.18 m away from Erdaomen was 8.32 m long, 4.82 m wide and 8.1 m high. Sidaomen (the fourth gate) was 19.3 m away from Sandaomen. Its hole was 8.8 m long, 4.8 m wide and 8.1 m high. At the outerside of the east and west of barbican were constructed 14 soldier staying holes (7 facing to the east 7 facing to the west). There are 27 soldier staying holes altogether in all the barbican and two paved ramps by which mounted troops can ride to the top.

Zhonghua Gate has weathered wind and rain for 600 years. It still holds its original state except that the wooden structure has been destroyed and some features on the wall constructed of sticks and stones. It is rare in the world for its vast scale and sophisticated style.

== Admission ==
The site is open to the public from 08:30 to 20:00, with tickets costing 50 yuan.

== Transportation ==
The area is accessible within walking distance north of Zhonghuamen Station of Nanjing Metro.

== See also ==
- Gate of China, Beijing
- Nanjing
  - City Wall of Nanjing
  - China Gate Castle Park
- Chinese city wall
