= Nanjing Little Red Flower Art Troupe =

Chinese children's art troupe

Nanjing Little Red Flower Art Troupe (Chinese: Nanjing xiaohonghua yishutuan 南京小红花艺术团) is a children's art troupe in China. It was organized in the 1950s by Nanjing Bureau of Art. Nanjing Little Red Flower Dance Troupe is the first Chinese children's art troupe which combines both culture education and art education. It has a faculty of high level and 138 students. There are 6 grades in the school and each grade has 6 classes. Students here finish their Chinese and Maths class in the morning and then have professional dance and instrument class in the afternoon. The combination of culture and art teaching is the biggest feature of the school.

In 1978, Nanjing Little Red Flower Dance Troupe became the first Chinese children's art troupe that visited the foreign country. It has paid over 20 visits to Europe, Asia, America and Africa, and performed for state heads and foreign delegations visiting Nanjing.
