= Liuhe Senior High School =

- 六合高级中学

Location
- 128 Yangcun Rd; Nanjing, Jiangsu; China

Information
- Type: Public school
- Established: 1941
- Principal: Tian Liu (田骝)

The full name of Liuhe First School (六合一中) is Liuhe Senior High School of Jiangsu Province (江苏省六合高级中学). It has changed names for five times and changed its location for three times. The Liuhe High School has almost 70 years of history.

== Awards received ==
It was confirmed as one of 95 Best High Schools which were built first in 1980. In 1991, it acquired acceptance as the Provincial Key Middle School. It was confirmed as "National Demonstration High School" in April 2002. In 2004, the Liuhe Senior High School of JIangsu Province was awarded as a four-star senior high school of Jiangsu province.
