= Line S1 (Nanjing Metro) =

Metro line in Nanjing, China

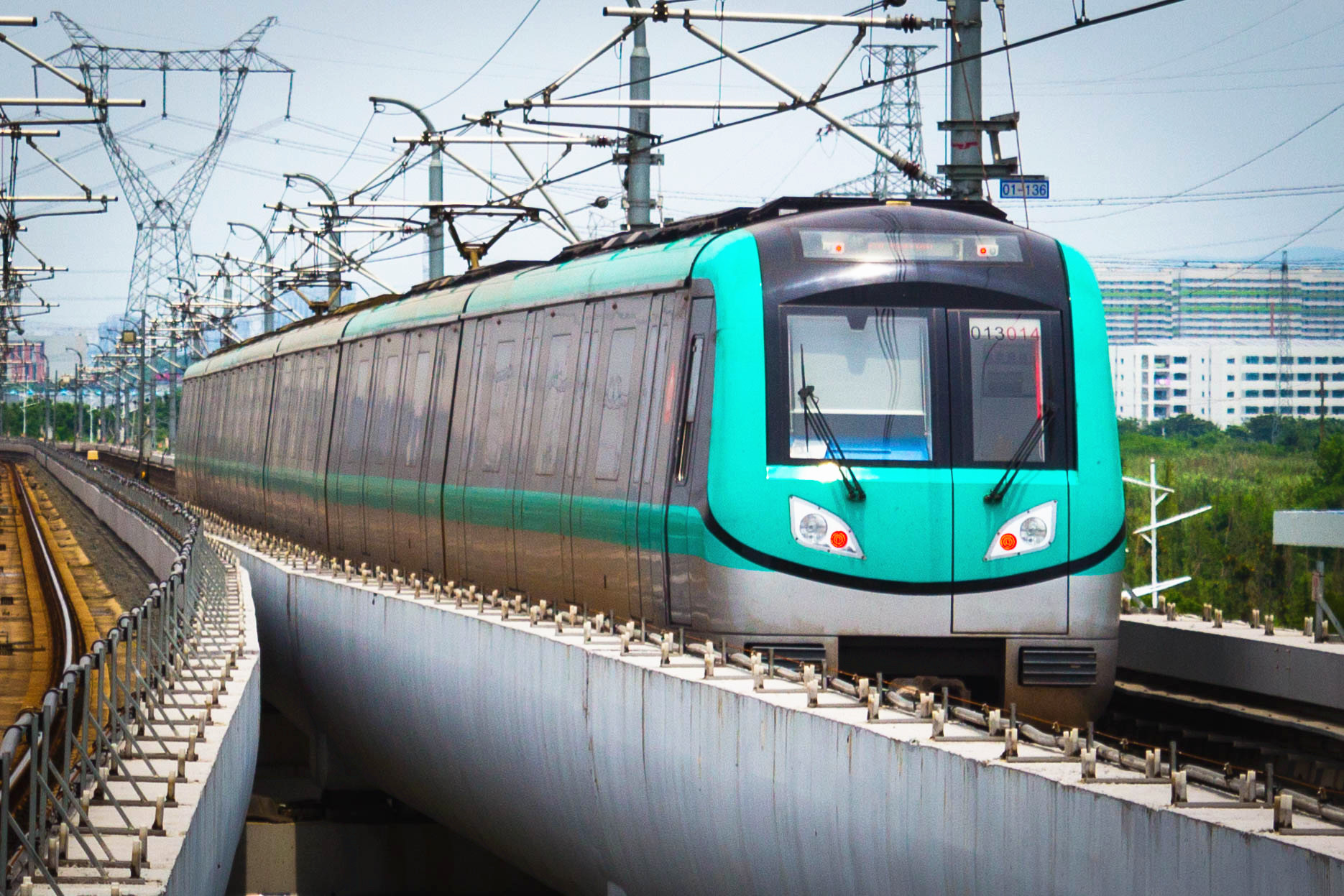
- A line S1 train is leaving Zhengfangzhonglu station

Overview
- Other name(s): Airport line Nanjing–Gaochun intercity railway Phase 1 Ninggao intercity railway Phase 1 (Note: "Ning" (宁), is the standard Chinese abbreviation for Nanjing. It comes from the name "Jiangning" (江宁) that the city had in the early Qing.)
- Status: In operation
- Owner: China Railways Airport Construction Group
- Locale: Jiangning and Yuhuatai districts Nanjing, Jiangsu
- Termini: Nanjing South Railway Station; Konggangxinchengjiangning
- Stations: 9

Service
- Type: Rapid transit, Airport rail link
- Operator: Nanjing Metro
- Daily ridership: 53,000 (2014 Avg.); 94,000 (2014 Peak)

History
- Opened: July 1, 2014; 12 years ago

Technical
- Line length: 36.3 km (22.6 mi)
- Number of tracks: 2
- Character: Underground and elevated
- Track gauge: 1,435 mm (4 ft 8 1/2 in)

Line S1 of the Nanjing Metro (Chinese: 南京地铁S1号线; pinyin: Nánjīng Dìtiě S-Yī Hào Xiàn), is a suburban metro rail line serving the southern suburbs of Nanjing, running from Nanjing South Railway Station to Konggang Xincheng Jiangning. It connects Nanjing South railway station with Nanjing Lukou International Airport. It is 36.3 km (22.6 mi) long has 9 stations. The line started construction on December 27, 2011, and was opened on July 1, 2014. In September 2011, a contract for 15 6-car Class B metro trains was given to CSR Corporation Limited, with the first train arriving in August 2013.

Line S1 also serves as the first stage of the Nanjing–Gaochun intercity railway, with Line S9 serving as the second stage.

On 29 September 2026, Line S1 started through operation with Line 6 at all times.

== Opening timeline ==
Segment	Commencement	Length	Station(s)	Name
Nanjing South — Nanjing Lukou International Airport	1 July 2014	35.8 km (22.25 mi)	8	Ninggao ICR Phase 1 & Ningli ICR Phase 1
Nanjing Lukou International Airport — Konggangxinchengjiangning	26 May 2018	1.5 km (0.93 mi)	1	Ningli ICR Phase 2
Konggangxinchengjiangning — Wuxiangshan	26 May 2018	see Line S7		(through services)

== Station list ==
Service Routes			Station name		Connections	Distance km		Location
Service Routes			English	Chinese	Connections	Distance km		Location
↑ Through service via Line 6 for Qixiashan
●	●	●	Nanjing South Railway Station	南京南站	1 3 S3 NKH	0.000	0.000	Yuhuatai / Jiangning
|	●	|	Cuipingshan	翠屏山		4.077	4.077	Jiangning
|	●	|	HHU / Fochengxilu	河海大学·佛城西路	12	3.252	7.329	Jiangning
|	●	|	Jiyindadao	吉印大道	5	3.242	10.571	Jiangning
|	●	|	Zhengfangzhonglu	正方中路		4.723	15.294	Jiangning
|	●	|	Xiangyulubei	翔宇路北		7.283	22.577	Jiangning
●	●	●	Xiangyulunan	翔宇路南	S9	4.234	26.811	Jiangning
●	●	●	Lukou International Airport	禄口机场	18 NKG	7.926	34.734	Jiangning
●	●	|	Konggangxinchengjiangning	空港新城江宁		1.583	36.317	Jiangning
		|	Zhetang	柘塘		see Line S7		Lishui
		|	Konggangxinchenglishui	空港新城溧水		see Line S7		Lishui
		|	Qunli	群力		see Line S7		Lishui
		|	Wolonghu	卧龙湖		see Line S7		Lishui
		●	Lishui	溧水		see Line S7		Lishui
		●	Zhongshanhu	中山湖		see Line S7		Lishui
		●	Xingzhuang	幸庄		see Line S7		Lishui
		●	Wuxiangshan	无想山		see Line S7		Lishui

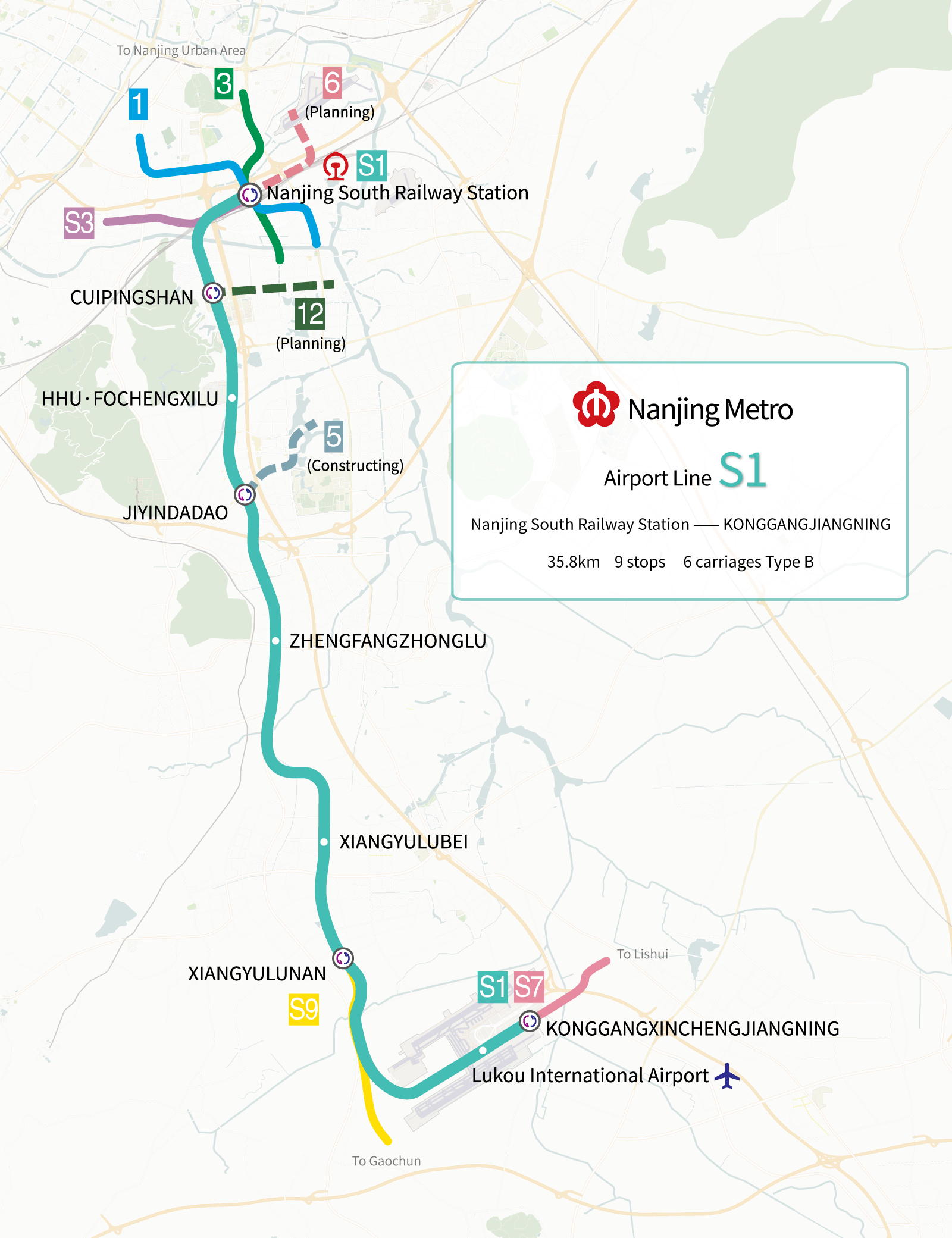
The map of Nanjing Metro Airport Line S1
