= Line S7 (Nanjing Metro) =

Metro line in Nanjing, China

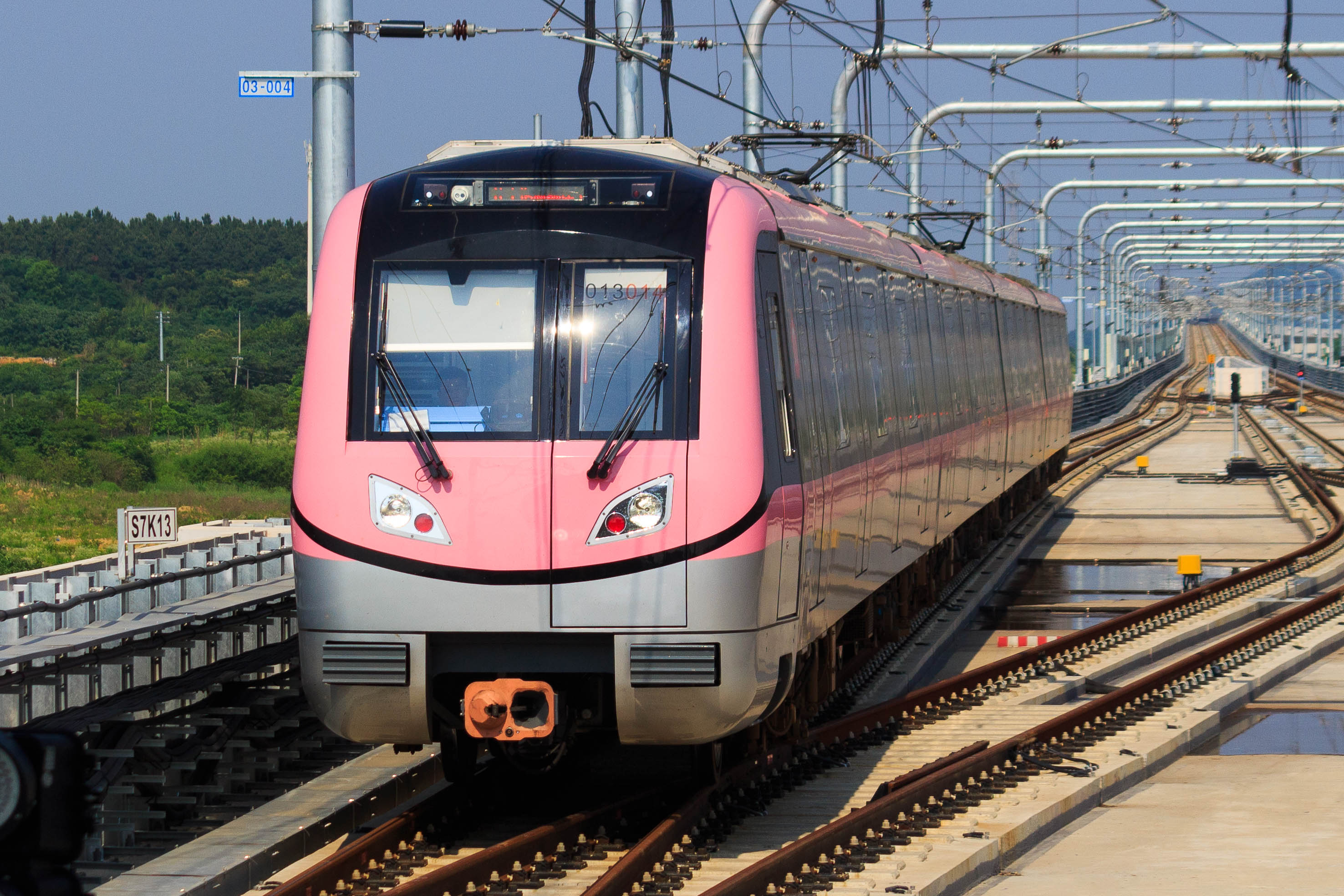

Overview
- Other names: Lishui line; Ningli Line; Nanjing–Lishui intercity railway; Ningli intercity railway (Note: "Ning" (宁), is the standard Chinese abbreviation for Nanjing. It comes from the name "Jiangning" (江宁) that the city had in the early Qing.)
- Status: In operation
- Locale: Jiangning and Lishui districts Nanjing, Jiangsu
- Termini: Konggangxinchengjiangning; Wuxiangshan
- Stations: 9

Service
- Type: Rapid transit
- Operator: Nanjing Metro

History
- Opened: 26 May 2018; 8 years ago

Technical
- Line length: 28.869 km (17.9 mi)
- Number of tracks: 2
- Character: Underground and elevated
- Track gauge: 1,435 mm (4 ft 8 1/2 in)

Line S7 of the Nanjing Metro (Chinese: 南京地铁S7号线; pinyin: Nánjīng Dìtiě S-Qī Hào Xiàn) is a north–south suburban rapid transit line primarily serving Nanjing's Lishui District, running from Konggangxinchengjiangning to Wuxiangshan, and was opened on 26 May 2018. The line is served by 4 car Class B trains with a maximum speed of 100 km/h (62 mph). The line is designed to allow for 6 cars trains to accommodate long term growth.

== Opening timeline ==
Segment	Commencement	Length	Station(s)	Name
Konggangxinchengjiangning — Wuxiangshan	26 May 2018	28.869 km (17.94 mi)	9	Ningli ICR Phase 2
Nanjing South — Konggangxinchengjiangning	26 May 2018	see Line S1		(through services)

== Station list ==
Service routes			Station name		Connections	Distance km		Location
Service routes			English	Chinese	Connections	Distance km		Location
↑ Through service via Line 6 for Qixiashan
		●	Nanjing South Railway Station	南京南站	1 3 S3 NKH	see Line S1		Yuhuatai / Jiangning
		|	Cuipingshan	翠屏山		see Line S1		Jiangning
		|	HHU / Fochengxilu	河海大学·佛城西路		see Line S1		Jiangning
		|	Jiyindadao	吉印大道	5	see Line S1		Jiangning
		|	Zhengfangzhonglu	正方中路		see Line S1		Jiangning
		|	Xiangyulubei	翔宇路北		see Line S1		Jiangning
		●	Xiangyulunan	翔宇路南	S9	see Line S1		Jiangning
		●	Lukou International Airport	禄口机场	NKG	see Line S1		Jiangning
●	●	|	Konggangxinchengjiangning	空港新城江宁		0.000	0.000	Jiangning
●	|	|	Zhetang	柘塘		5.701	5.701	Lishui
●	|	|	Konggangxinchenglishui	空港新城溧水		5.623	11.324	Lishui
●	|	|	Qunli	群力		3.301	14.625	Lishui
●	|	|	Wolonghu	卧龙湖		5.938	20.563	Lishui
●	●	●	Lishui	溧水		2.595	23.158	Lishui
●	●	●	Zhongshanhu	中山湖		1.630	24.788	Lishui
●	●	●	Xingzhuang	幸庄		2.617	27.405	Lishui
●	●	●	Wuxiangshan	无想山		1.464	28.869	Lishui
