= Line 6 (Nanjing Metro) =

Under construction metro line in Nanjing, Jiangsu Province

- Rolling stock of Line 6

Overview
- Status: In operation
- Owner: Nanjing Metro
- Locale: Nanjing, Jiangsu, China
- Termini: Nanjing South Railway Station; Qixiashan
- Stations: 20

Service
- Type: Rapid transit
- System: Nanjing Metro
- Operator: Nanjing Metro
- Depot: Qixiashan Depot

History
- Opened: 29 September 2026; 54 days ago

Technical
- Line length: 32.365 km (20.111 mi)
- Num of tracks: 2
- Track gauge: 1,435 mm (4 ft 8 1/2 in)
- Electrification: 1.5 kV DC Overhead catenary contact
- Operating speed: 100 km/h (62 mph) (Maximum design speed)
Route map

Line 6 of the Nanjing Metro is a north-south line. The earliest plan was to commence operation in 2024, but it was later moved to the end of 2025, then expected to begin in the third quarter of 2026. The line officially opened on 29 September 2026.

The line through-operates with Line S1 to Konggangxinchengjiangning and has a twice-daily through service with Line S7.

== History ==
Construction started on 28 December 2019.

In June 2021, the National Development and Reform Commission issued the "Yangtze River Delta Multi-Level Rail Transit Plan," which mentioned the extension plan for Line 6.

In January 2025, the first rolling stock set of Line 6 arrived at Qixiashan depot.

From 23 December to 26 December 2025, a project acceptance meeting of Line 6 was held.

On 26 December 2025, Line 6 and Line S2 passed engineering acceptance and began trial operation without passengers.

On 8 January 2026, the entire line began trial operation without passengers.

On 29 September 2026, the line officially commenced operations.

== Stations ==
| Station name | | Connections | Distance km | Location |
| English | Chinese | Connections | Distance km | Location |
|---|---|---|---|---|
| Qixiashan | 栖霞山 | 14 | | Qixia |
| Jinlingshihua | 金陵石化 | | | Qixia |
| Shiyueguangchang | 十月广场 | 8 | | Qixia |
| Xingzhijie | 兴智街 | | | Qixia |
| Xingxuelu | 兴学路 | | | Qixia |
| Yanjiangxincheng | 燕江新城 | | | Qixia |
| Wanshou | 万寿 | 7 | | Qixia |
| Yingyuannanlu | 营苑南路 | | | Xuanwu |
| Hongshanxincheng | 红山新城 | 9 | | Xuanwu |
| Huayuanlu | 花园路 | | | Xuanwu |
| Gangzicun | 岗子村 | 4 | | Xuanwu |
| Fuguishan | 富贵山 | | | Xuanwu |
| Minggugong | 明故宫 | 2 | | Xuanwu / Qinhuai |
| Guanghuamen | 光华门 | 5 | | Qinhuai |
| Zhongheqiao | 中和桥 | 8 | | Qinhuai |
| Yingtiandongjie | 应天东街 | | | Qinhuai |
| Nanjing Hospital of C.M. | 市中医院 | | | Qinhuai |
| Jichangpaodaojiuzhi | 机场跑道旧址 | 10 16 | | Qinhuai |
| Jiagang | 夹岗 | | | Qinhuai |
| Nanjing South Railway Station | 南京南站 | 1 3 S3 NKH | | Yuhuatai |
↓ Through service via Line S1 and Line S7 to Konggangxinchengjiangning and Wuxiangshan
