= Qunli station =

Nanjing Metro station

Qunli 群力
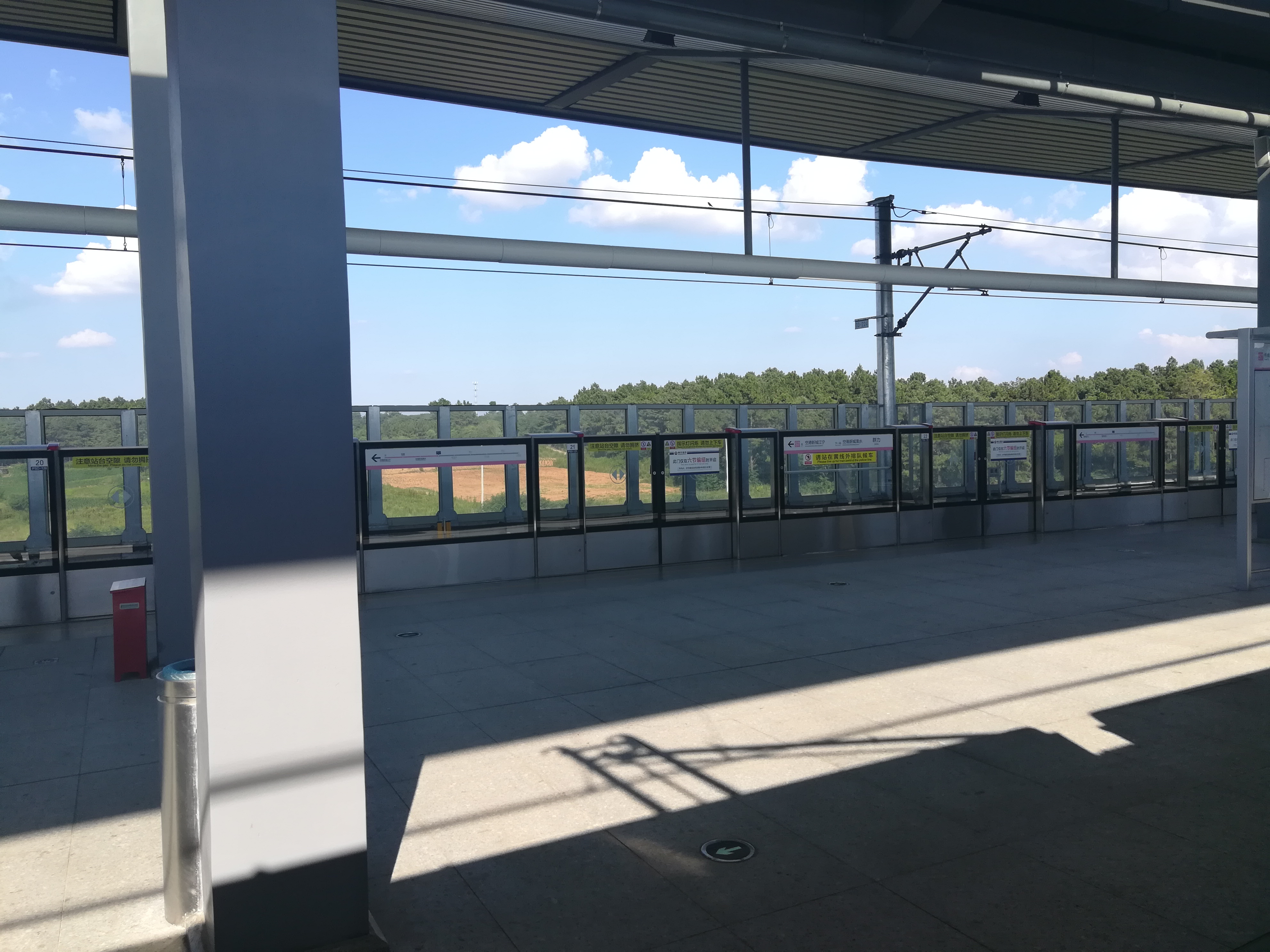

General information
- Location: Lishui District, Nanjing, Jiangsu; China
- Coordinates: 31.72°N 119.01°E
- Line(s): Line S7

History
- Opened: 26 May 2018

Services
Preceding station	Nanjing Metro	Following station
Konggangxinchenglishui towards Konggangxinchengjiangning	Line S7	Wolonghu towards Wuxiangshan

Qunli station (Chinese: 群力站; pinyin: Qúnlì Zhàn) is a station on the suburban Line S7 of the Nanjing Metro. It commenced operations along with the rest of the line on 26 May 2018.
