= Wolonghu station =

Nanjing Metro station

Coordinates: 31.68977°N 119.03776°E

Wolonghu 卧龙湖站
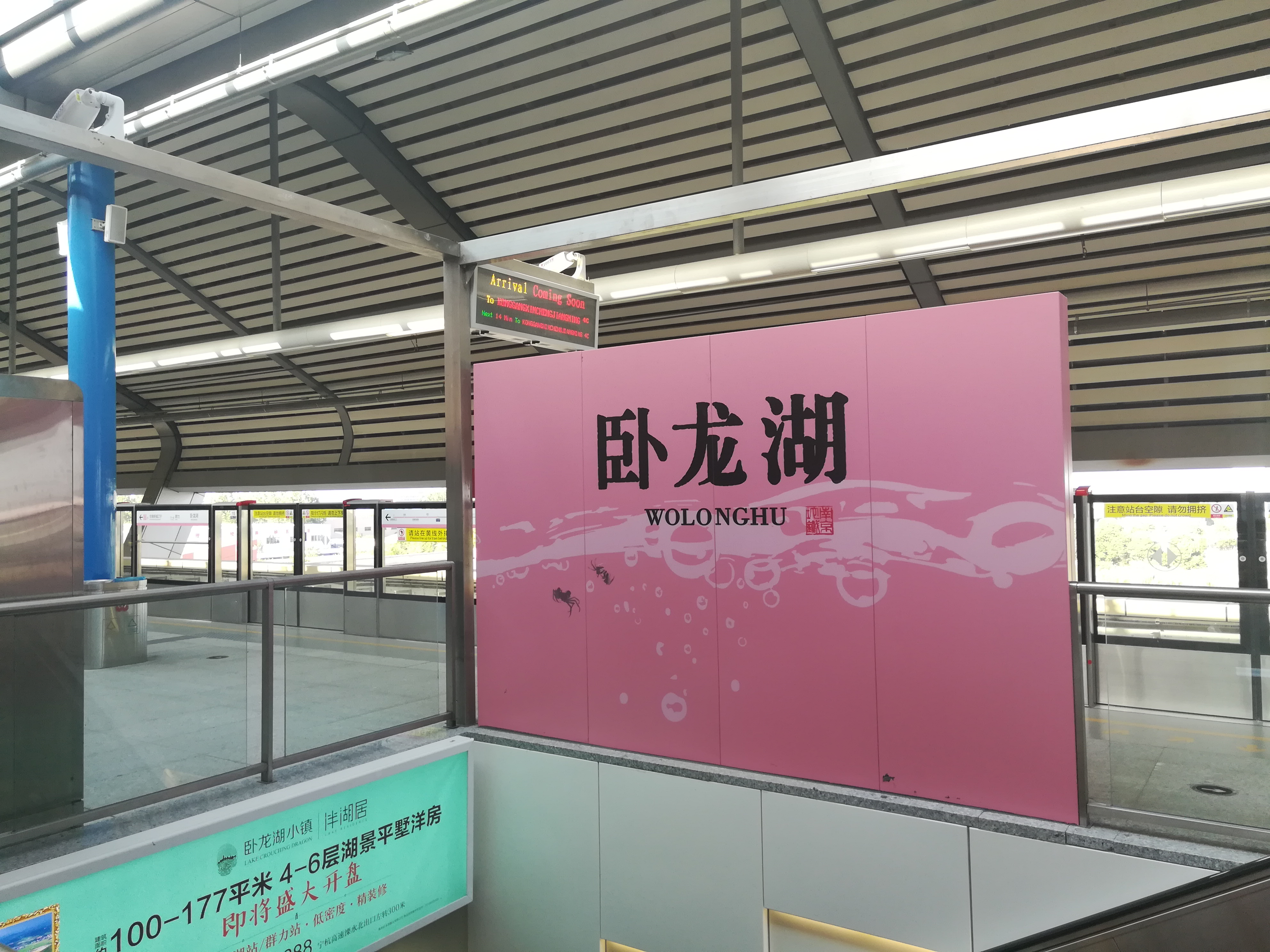

General information
- Location: Lishui District, Nanjing, Jiangsu; China
- Line: Line S7

History
- Opened: 26 May 2018

Services
Preceding station	Nanjing Metro	Following station
Qunli towards Konggangxinchengjiangning	Line S7	Lishui towards Wuxiangshan
Location

Wolonghu station (simplified Chinese: 卧龙湖站; traditional Chinese: 臥龍湖站; pinyin: Wòlónghú Zhàn; lit. 'Wolong Lake station') is a station on the suburban Line S7 of the Nanjing Metro. It commenced operations along with the rest of the line on 26 May 2018.
