= Konggangxinchenglishui station =

Nanjing Metro station

Konggangxinchenglishui 空港新城溧水
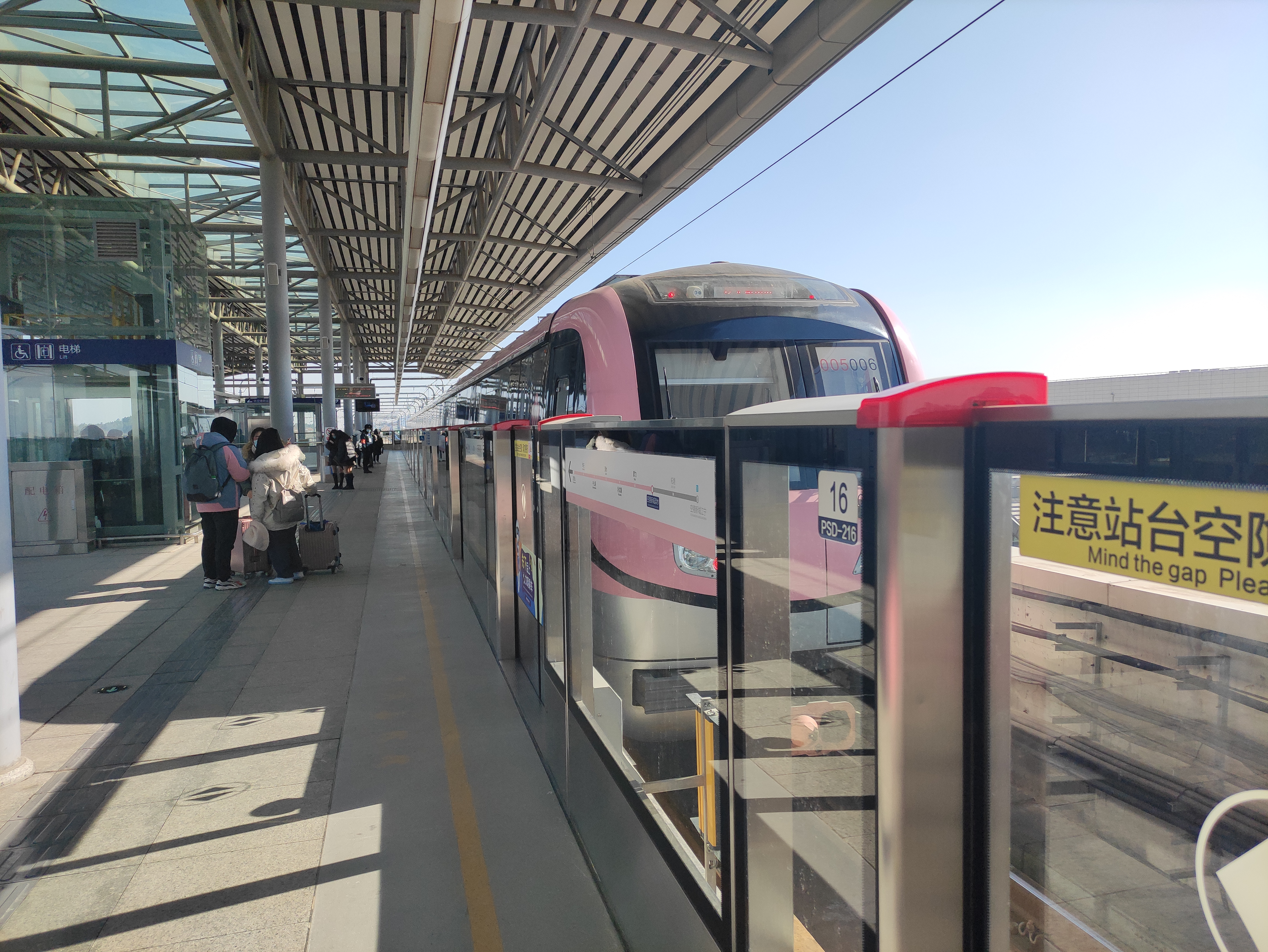

General information
- Location: Runhuai Avenue; Lishui District, Nanjing, Jiangsu; China
- Coordinates: 31°44′N 118°59′E
- Line: Line S7

History
- Opened: 26 May 2018

Services
| Preceding station | Nanjing Metro | Following station |
|---|---|---|
| Zhetang towards Konggangxinchengjiangning | Line S7 | Qunli towards Wuxiangshan |
Location

Konggangxinchenglishui station (Chinese: 空港新城溧水站; pinyin: Kōnggǎngxīnchénglìshuǐ Zhàn; lit. 'Airport new city Lishui station') is a station on the suburban Line S7 of the Nanjing Metro. It commenced operations along with the rest of the line on 26 May 2018.
