= Zhongshanhu station =

Nanjing Metro station

Zhongshanhu 中山湖
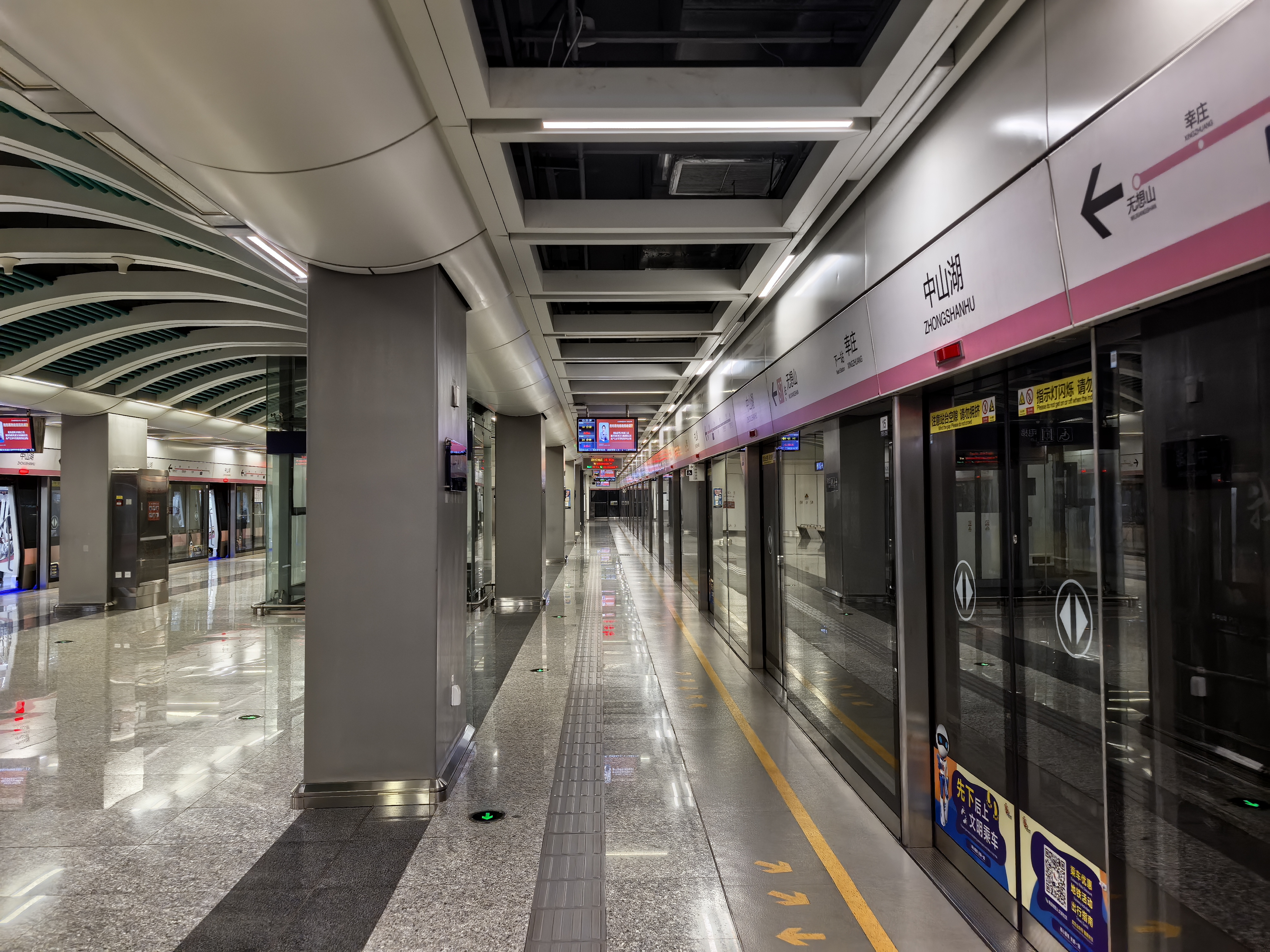

General information
- Location: Lishui District, Nanjing, Jiangsu; China
- Coordinates: 31.648968°N 119.039761°E
- Line: Line S7

History
- Opened: 26 May 2018

Services
Preceding station	Nanjing Metro	Following station
Lishui towards Konggangxinchengjiangning	Line S7	Xingzhuang towards Wuxiangshan
Location

Zhongshanhu station (Chinese: 中山湖站; pinyin: Zhōngshān Hú Zhàn; lit. 'Zhongshan (Sun Yat-sen) lake station') is a station on the suburban Line S7 of the Nanjing Metro. It commenced operations along with the rest of the line on 26 May 2018.
