= Lishui station (Nanjing Metro) =

Nanjing Metro station

Lishui 溧水站
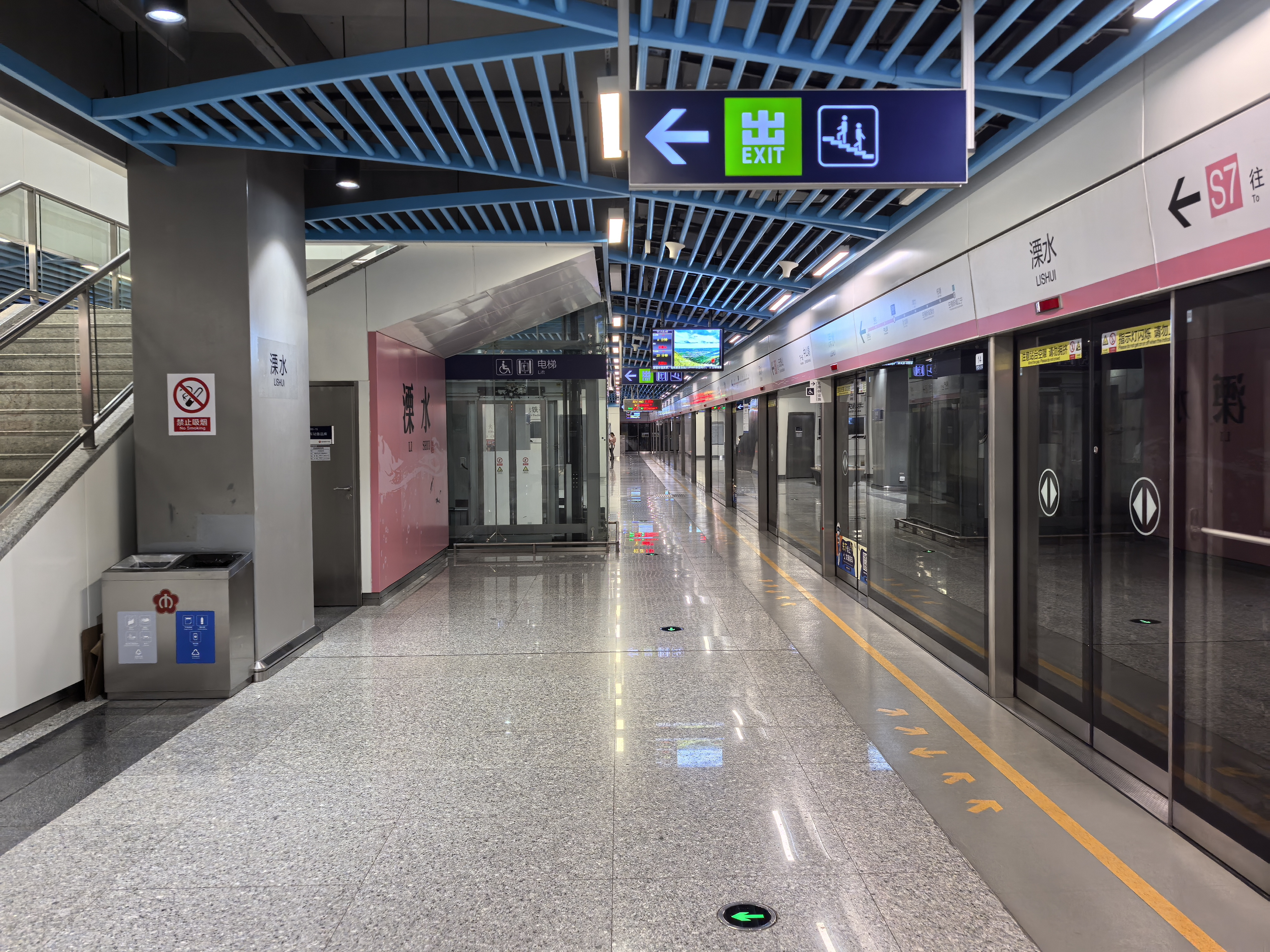

General information
- Location: Qinhuai Avenue × Jiaotong Road & Jiaotong East Road; Lishui District, Nanjing, Jiangsu; China
- Coordinates: 31°40′N 119°02′E
- Line: Line S7

History
- Opened: 26 May 2018

Services
Preceding station	Nanjing Metro	Following station
Wolonghu towards Konggangxinchengjiangning	Line S7	Zhongshanhu towards Wuxiangshan
Location

Lishui station (Chinese: 溧水站; pinyin: Lìshuǐ Zhàn) is a station on the suburban Line S7 of the Nanjing Metro. It commenced operations along with the rest of the line on 26 May 2018.
