= Xingzhuang station =

Nanjing Metro station

Xingzhuang 幸庄
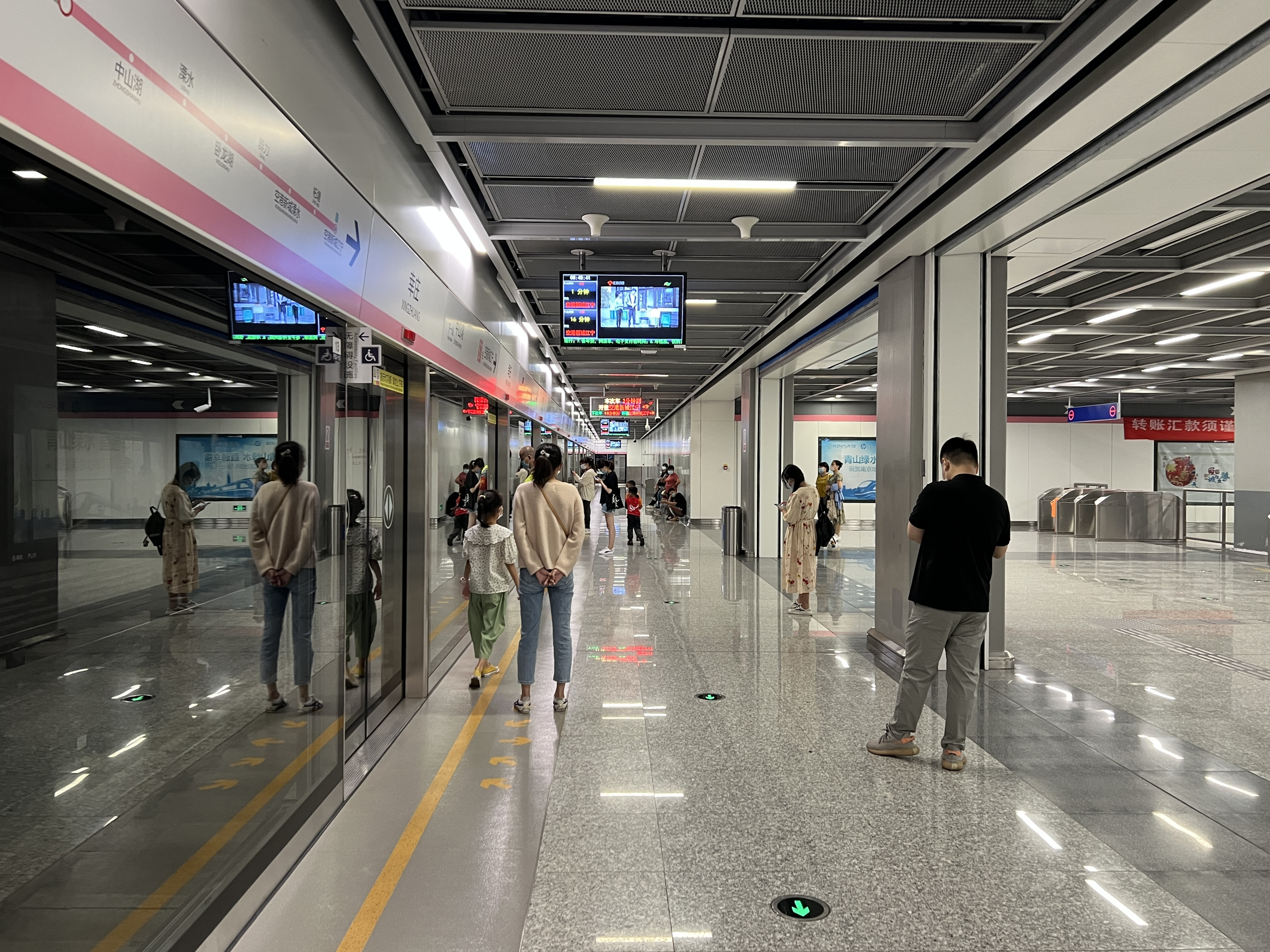

General information
- Location: Lishui District, Nanjing, Jiangsu; China
- Coordinates: 31.63°N 119.04°E
- Line: Line S7

History
- Opened: 26 May 2018

Services
Preceding station	Nanjing Metro	Following station
Zhongshanhu towards Konggangxinchengjiangning	Line S7	Wuxiangshan Terminus
Location

Xingzhuang station (simplified Chinese: 幸庄站; traditional Chinese: 幸莊站; pinyin: Xìngzhuāng Zhàn) is a station on the suburban Line S7 of the Nanjing Metro. It commenced operations along with the rest of the line on 26 May 2018.
