= Zhengfangzhonglu station =

Metro station of Line S1 of the Nanjing Metro, China

Zhengfangzhonglu 正方中路
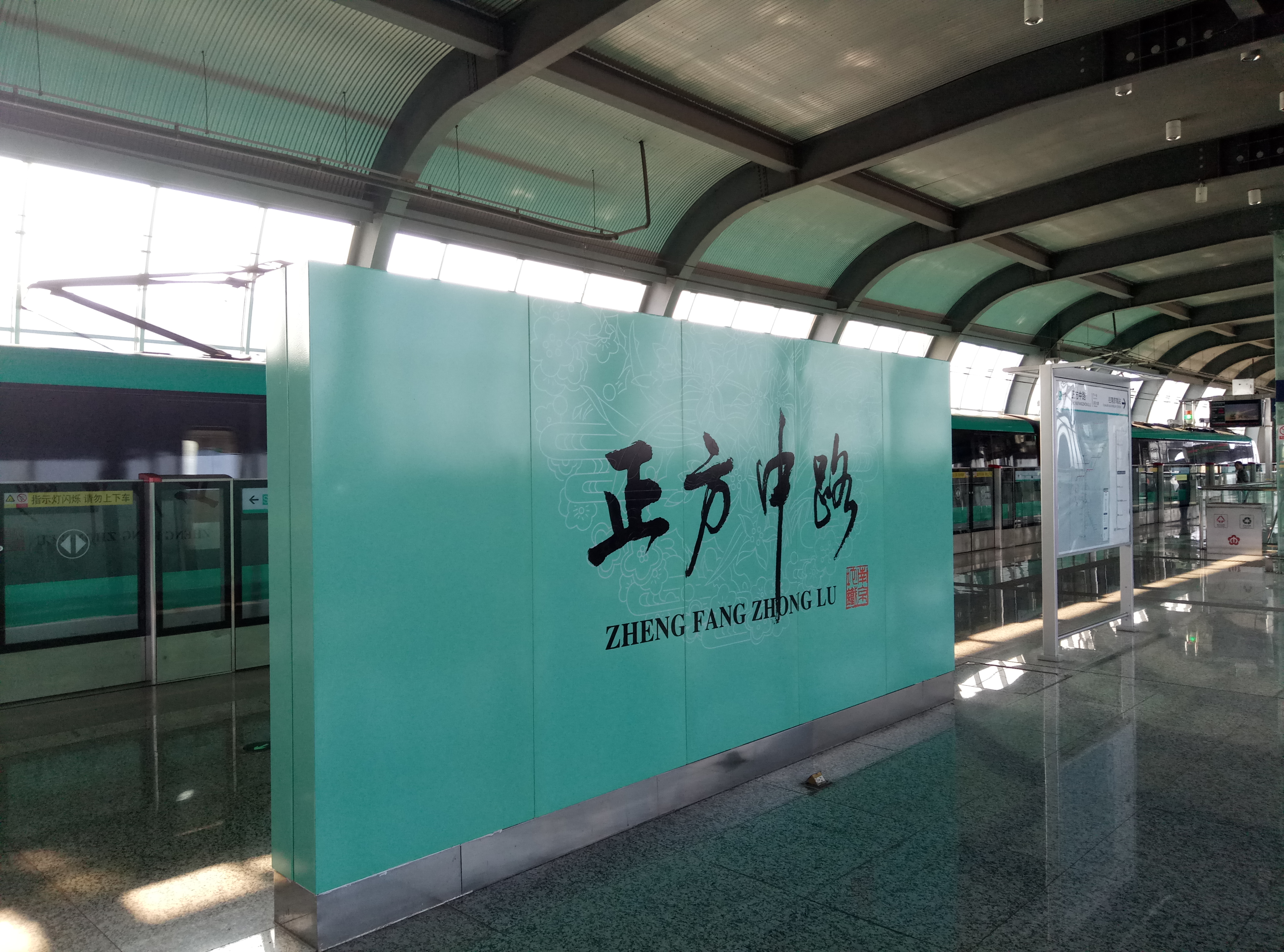

General information
- Location: Jiangning District, Nanjing, Jiangsu; China
- Coordinates: 31°51′06″N 118°48′44″E
- Operated by: Nanjing Metro Co. Ltd.
- Line: Line S1

Construction
- Structure type: Elevated

History
- Opened: 1 July 2014; 11 years ago

Services
Preceding station	Nanjing Metro	Following station
Jiyindadao towards Nanjing South Railway Station	Line S1	Xiangyulubei towards Konggangxinchengjiangning
Location

Zhengfangzhonglu station (Chinese: 正方中路站; lit. 'Middle Zhengfang Road') is a station of Line S1 of the Nanjing Metro. It started operations on 1 July 2014.
