= Jiyindadao station =

Metro station in Nanjing, China

Coordinates: 31°53′17″N 118°47′25″E

Jiyindadao 吉印大道
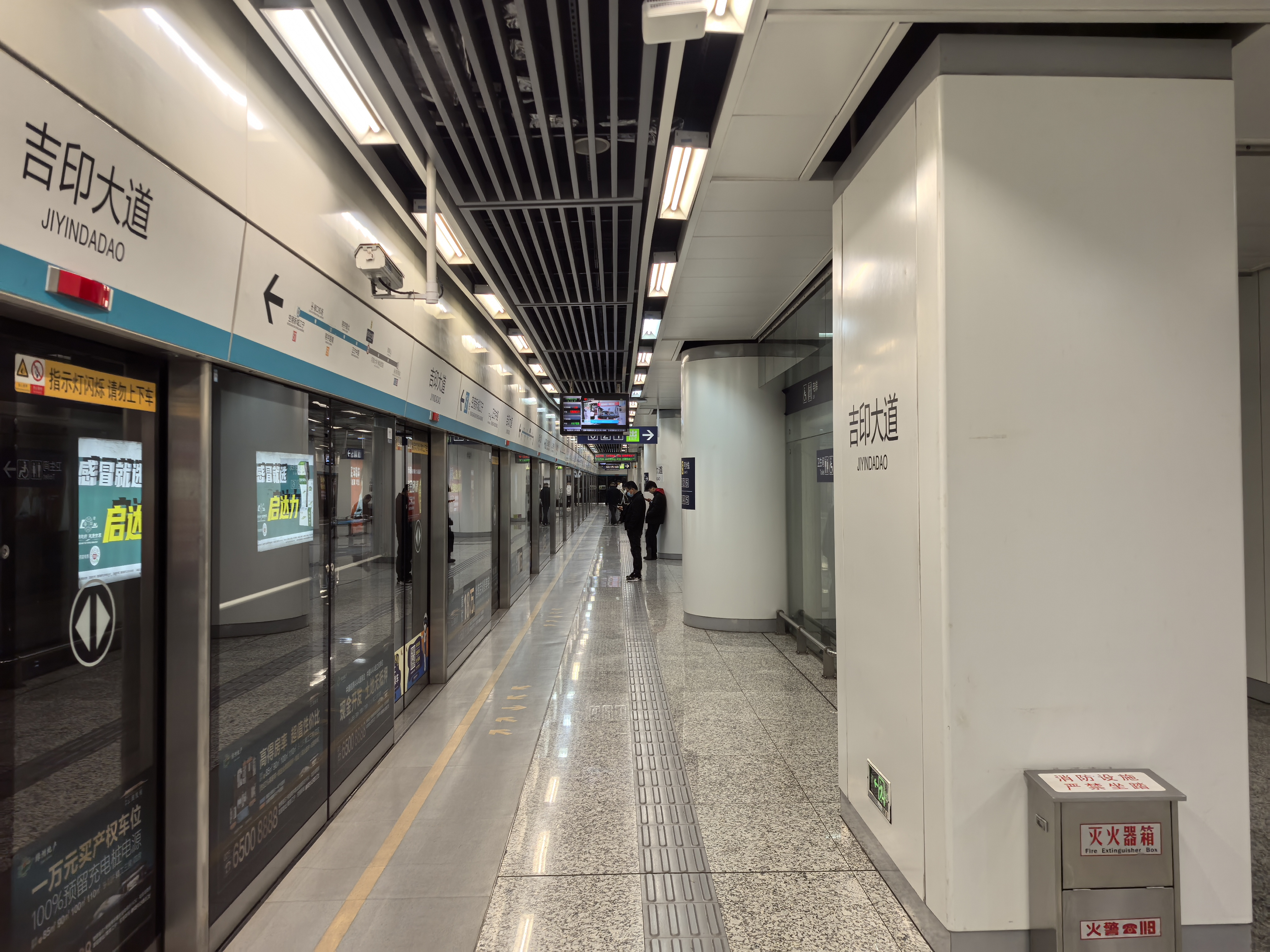
- Platforms of Line S1

General information
- Location: Jiangning District, Nanjing, Jiangsu; China
- Operated by: Nanjing Metro Co. Ltd.
- Lines: Line 5 Line S1

Construction
- Structure type: Underground

History
- Opened: 1 July 2014; 12 years ago (Line S1); 31 March 2024; 2 years ago (Line 5)

Services
Preceding station	Nanjing Metro	Following station
Jiulonghunan towards Fangjiaying	Line 5	Terminus
Hohai University / Fochengxilu towards Nanjing South Railway Station	Line S1	Zhengfangzhonglu towards Konggangxinchengjiangning
Location

Jiyindadao station (Chinese: 吉印大道站; pinyin: Jíyìn Dàdào zhàn; lit. 'Jiyin Avenue station') is a station of Line 5 and Line S1 of the Nanjing Metro. It started operations on 1 July 2014.
