= Zhetang station =

Nanjing Metro station

Zhetang 柘塘站
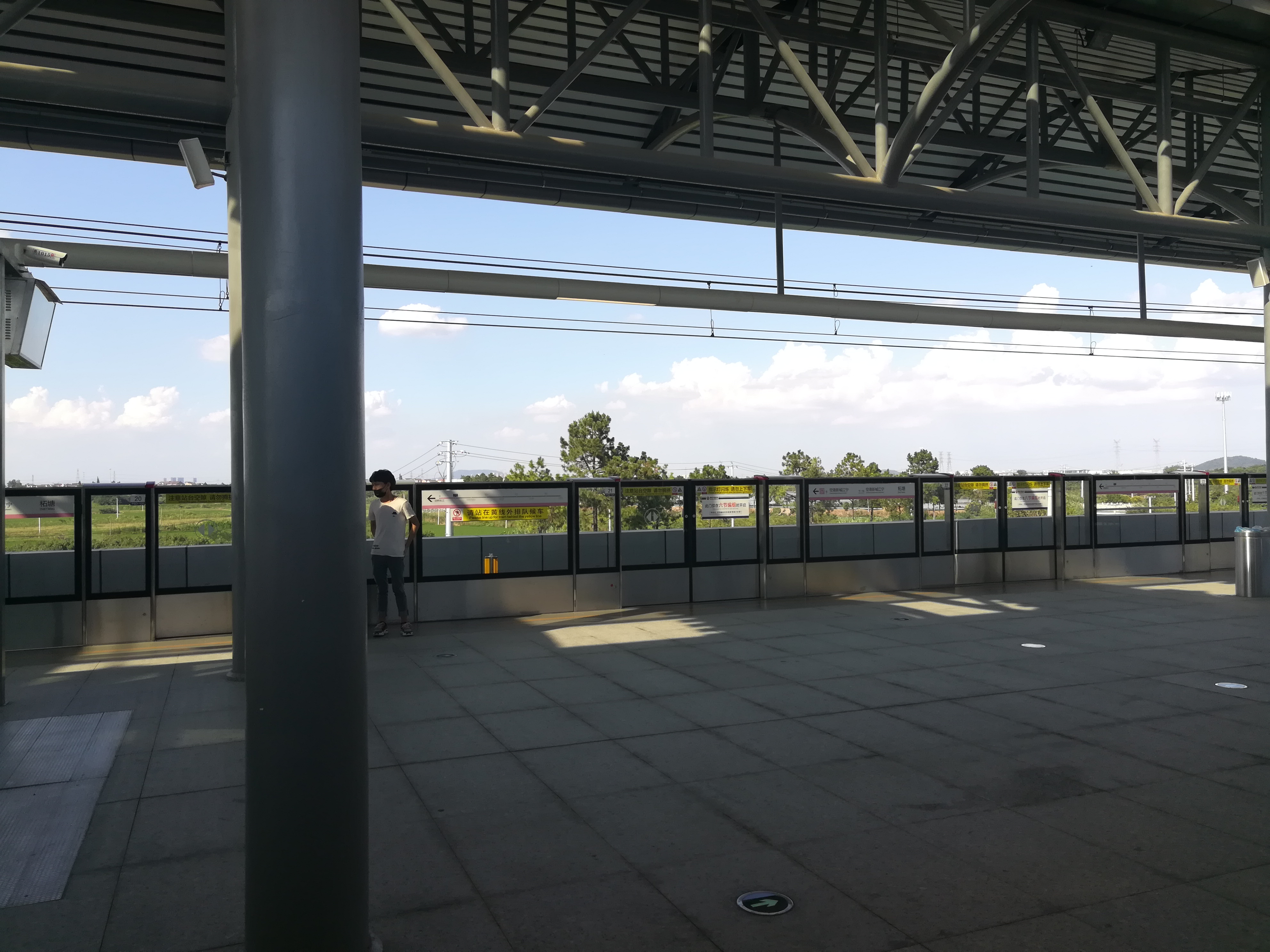

General information
- Location: Lishui District, Nanjing, Jiangsu; China
- Coordinates: 31.759186°N 118.932596°E
- Line(s): Line S7

History
- Opened: 26 May 2018

Services
Preceding station	Nanjing Metro	Following station
Konggangxinchengjiangning Terminus	Line S7	Konggangxinchenglishui towards Wuxiangshan

Zhetang station (Chinese: 柘塘站; pinyin: Zhètáng Zhàn) is a station on the suburban Line S7 of the Nanjing Metro. It commenced operations along with the rest of the line on 26 May 2018.
