= Baima, Nanjing =

Baima 白马镇
- Town
- Location in Jiangsu
- Coordinates: 31°34′56″N 119°10′17″E
- Country: People's Republic of China
- Province: Jiangsu
- Prefecture-level city: Nanjing
- District: Lishui District
- Time zone: UTC+8 (China Standard)

Baima (Chinese: 白马; Chinese: 白馬; pinyin: báimǎ) is a town under the administration of Lishui District, Nanjing, Jiangsu, China. As of 2020, it has six residential communities and four villages under its administration:

Neighborhoods

- Baima
- Jingu (金谷)
- Shangyang Community (上洋社区)
- Gexin Community (革新社区)
- Zhujiabian Community (朱家边社区)
- Bailong Community (白龙社区)

Villages

- Shitouzhai Village (石头寨村)
- Caojiaqiao Village (曹家桥村)
- Dashuxia Village (大树下村)
- Fushan Village (浮山村)
