= Xiangyulubei station =

Metro station in Nanjing, China

Xiangyulubei 翔宇路北
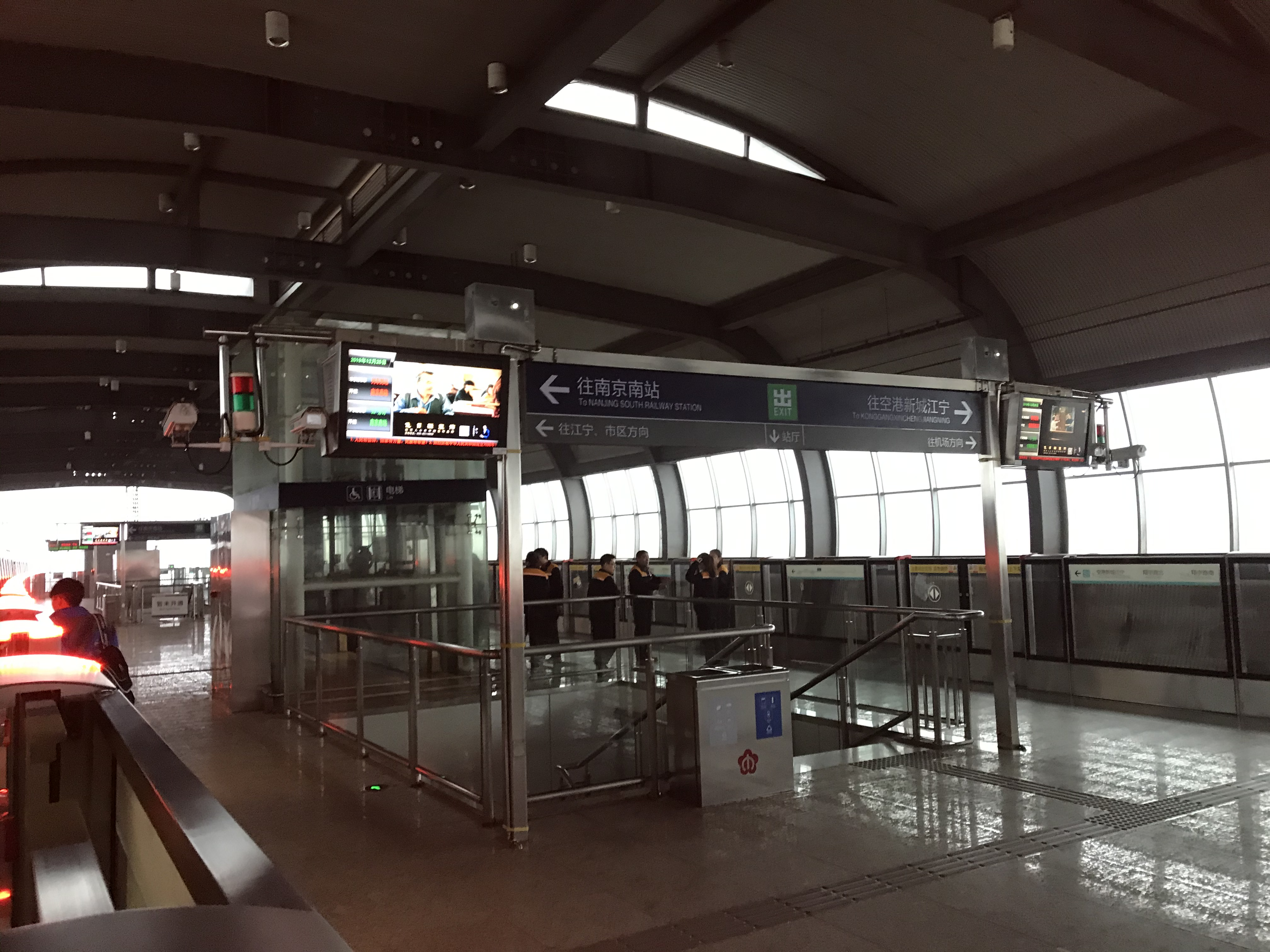

General information
- Location: Jiangning District, Nanjing, Jiangsu; China
- Coordinates: 31.79325°N 118.81647°E
- Operated by: Nanjing Metro Co. Ltd.
- Line: Line S1

Construction
- Structure type: Elevated

History
- Opened: 1 July 2014; 11 years ago

Services
| Preceding station | Nanjing Metro | Following station |
|---|---|---|
| Zhengfangzhonglu towards Nanjing South Railway Station | Line S1 | Xiangyulunan towards Konggangxinchengjiangning |
Location

Xiangyulubei station (Chinese: 翔宇路北站) is a station of Line S1 of the Nanjing Metro. It started operations on 1 July 2014.
