= Cuipingshan station =

Metro station in Nanjing, China

Cuipingshan 翠屏山

General information
- Location: Jiangning District, Nanjing, Jiangsu; China
- Coordinates: 31.94879°N 118.7911°E
- Operator: Nanjing Metro Co. Ltd.
- Line: Line S1

Construction
- Structure type: Underground

History
- Opened: 1 July 2014; 12 years ago

Services
Preceding station	Nanjing Metro	Following station
Nanjing South Railway Station towards Nanjing South Railway Station	Line S1	Hohai University / Fochengxilu towards Konggangxinchengjiangning
Location

Cuipingshan station (Chinese: 翠屏山站) is a station of Line S1 of the Nanjing Metro. It started operations on 1 July 2014.
