= Hohai University / Fochengxilu station =

Metro station in Nanjing, China

Hohai University / Fochengxilu 河海大学·佛城西路
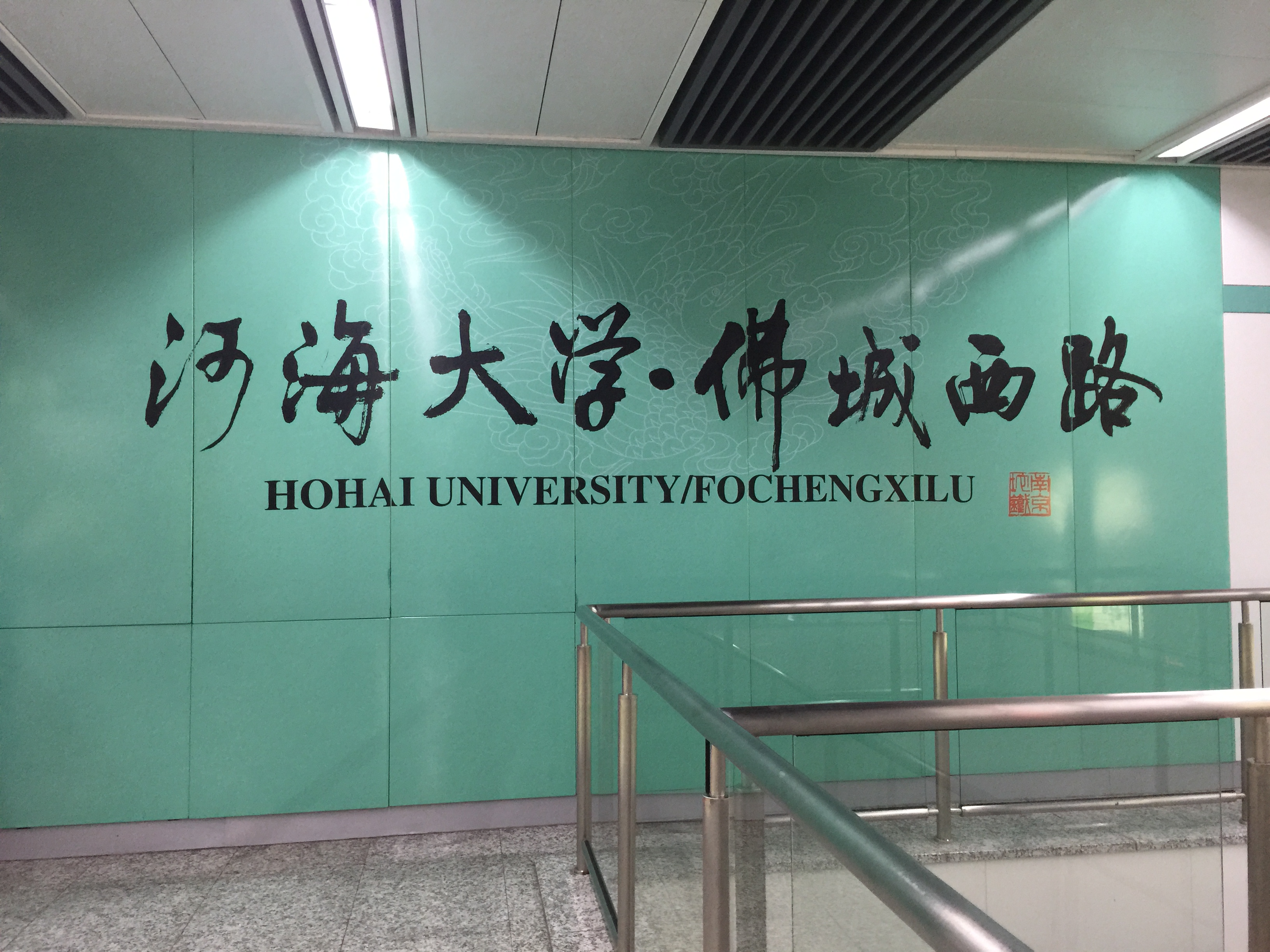
- The wall of station name

General information
- Location: Jiangning District, Nanjing, Jiangsu; China
- Operated by: Nanjing Metro Co. Ltd.
- Line: Line S1

Construction
- Structure type: Underground

History
- Opened: 1 July 2014; 11 years ago

Services
Preceding station	Nanjing Metro	Following station
Cuipingshan towards Nanjing South Railway Station	Line S1	Jiyindadao towards Konggangxinchengjiangning
Location

Hohai University / Fochengxilu station (Chinese: 河海大学·佛城西路站; lit. 'Hohai University / Focheng West Road') is a station of Line S1 of the Nanjing Metro. It began operations on 1 July 2014.
