= Nanjing Lukou International Airport =

International airport serving Nanjing, Jiangsu, China

Nanjing Lukou International Airport 南京禄口国际机场
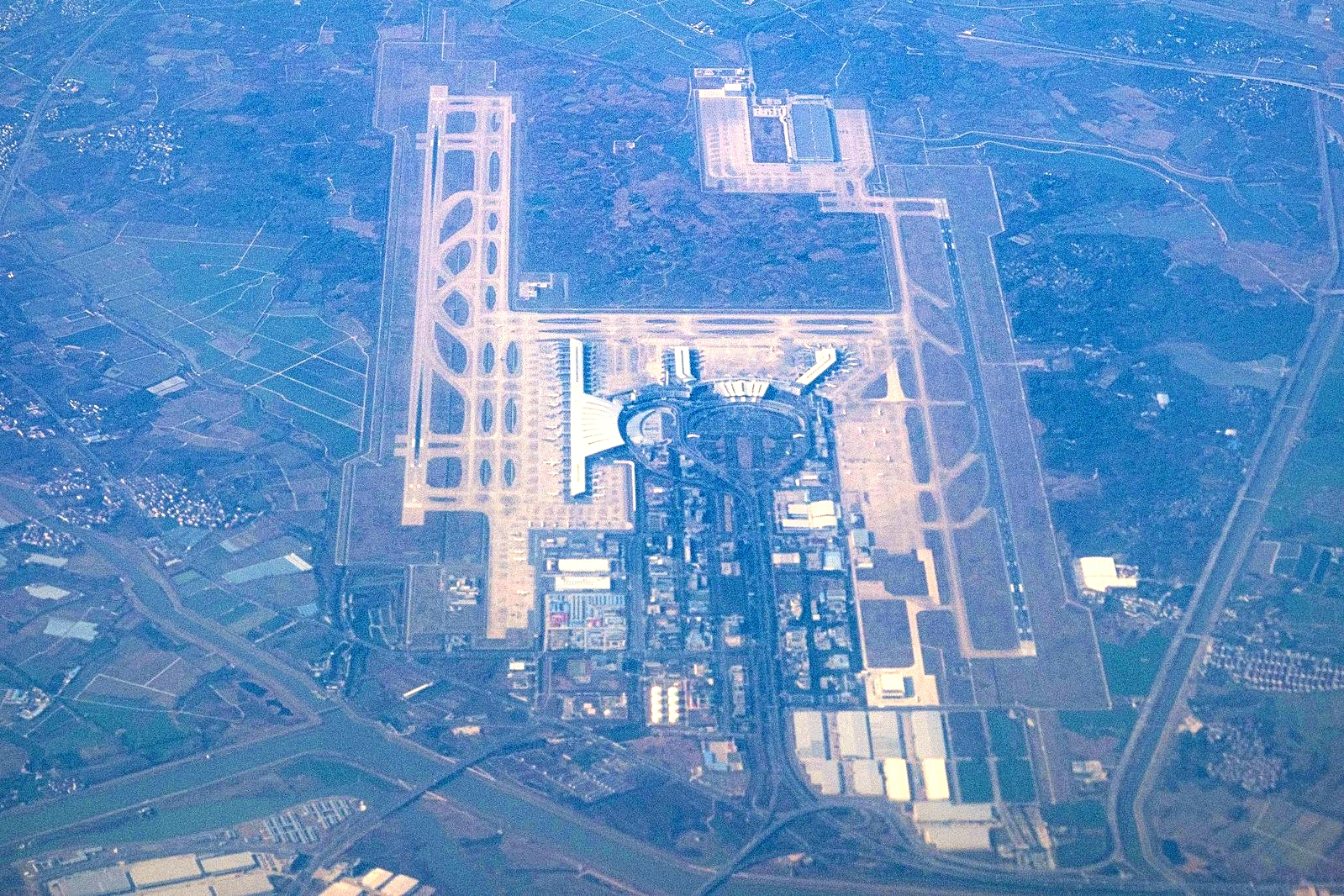
- IATA: NKG; ICAO: ZSNJ

Summary
- Airport type: Public
- Owner/Operator: Eastern Airport Group Co., Ltd.
- Serves: Nanjing
- Location: Lukou, Jiangning, Nanjing, Jiangsu, China
- Opened: 1 July 1997; 29 years ago
- Hub for: China Postal Airlines
- Focus city for: China Eastern Airlines; China Southern Airlines; Juneyao Air; Shenzhen Airlines
- Operating base for: Air Travel
- Elevation AMSL: 15 m (49 ft)
- Coordinates: 31°44′32″N 118°51′43″E
- Website: www.njairport.cn

Maps
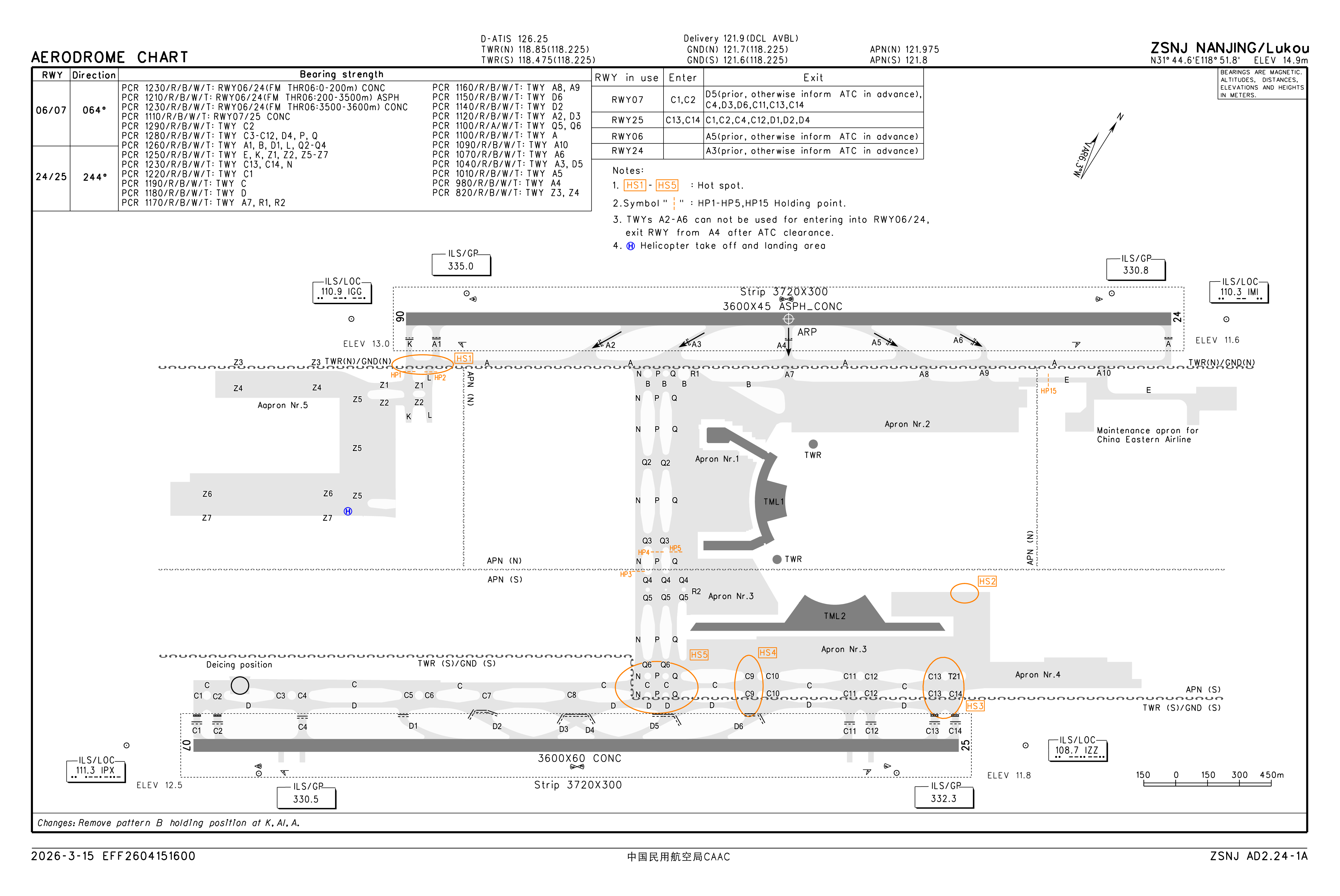
- CAAC airport chart

- Location in Jiangsu Location in China

Runways
Direction	Length		Surface
Direction	m	ft	Surface
06/24	3,600	11,811	Asphalt
07/25	3,600	11,811	Concrete

Statistics (2025)
- Passengers: 31,378,166 ▲0.6%
- Cargo (Metric tonnes): 476,682.5 ▲15.0
- Aircraft movements: 235,200 ▼1.1%
- Source: List of the busiest airports in China

Nanjing Lukou International Airport
- Simplified Chinese: 南京禄口国际机场
- Traditional Chinese: 南京祿口國際機場
Transcriptions
Standard Mandarin
- Hanyu Pinyin: Nánjīng Lùkǒu Guójì Jīchǎng

Nanjing Lukou International Airport (IATA: NKG, ICAO: ZSNJ) is an international airport serving Nanjing, the capital of East China's Jiangsu province, and a major airport serving the Yangtze River Delta area. As of 2020, it is the 12th busiest civil airport in China, dropping one place from 2019 after being overtaken by Zhengzhou Xinzheng International Airport. It is located in the suburban Jiangning District, over 35 km (22 mi) south of the city center, and is connected to Nanjing and neighboring towns by expressways. Phase I of the Ninggao Intercity Line and Line S1 of the Nanjing Metro link the airport with Nanjing South railway station.

Nanjing is the hub for China Eastern Airlines' Jiangsu Company, Shenzhen Airlines' Jiangsu branch and Juneyao Air's Jiangsu branch. China Southern Airlines operates a considerable number of flights there as well. Despite not operating as much flights as some other airlines, Beijing Capital Airlines and Air Travel also set up bases in Nanjing. Nanjing is the main base for China Postal Airlines, with pure cargo service to all major cities in China, handling express mail and cargo transportation for China Post. In 2020, the airport handled 19,906,576 passengers and 389,362.4 tons of freight after experiencing a 34.9% drop in passenger traffic due to the impact of the COVID-19 pandemic. In 2025, the airport recorded 235,200 flight take-offs and landings, and 31.38 million passenger movements, representing a year-on-year increases of -1.1% and 0.6% respectively.

== History ==
In 2006, China Post started building its express logistics center at Nanjing Lukou to handle its express mail services. Initial construction was completed by 2009, with additional facilities and functions added continuously. The final project, as planned, would be the largest in Asia and the third-largest in the world of its kind.

In 2009, the airport handled 10 million passengers. On 26 March 2010, Singapore Airlines officially ceases its operation between Singapore Changi and Nanjing. In 2013, that number surpassed 15 million, which was 3 million above the terminal's designed operational capacity. In preparation for the 2014 Summer Youth Olympics, hosted by Nanjing, Terminal 2 was completed after more than three years of construction. Also completed were a new parallel runway with taxiways, a new tower, new aircraft parking positions, and new cargo handling facilities. On 12 July 2014, all flights were relocated to Terminal 2, and Terminal 1 was closed for renovation.

The new facilities removed the bottleneck caused by the limited capability of the old terminal and runway. In November 2014, with the launching of the Phase 2 expansion and optimization of neighboring air traffic patterns, authorities approved an increase of peak-hour flight volume from 28 flights per hour to 38 flights per hour.

With the added capacity, Nanjing Airport has seen rapid increase in both aircraft movement and total passengers. In 2015, the number of total passengers exceeded 19 million (until 28 December), that is 2.87 million on top of 2014, a 17.7% increase compared to the same period of the previous year. The airport continues to see substantial increase into 2016, which saw 29,210 aircraft movements and 3.39 million passengers handled in January and February, a 16.9% and a 21.2% increase respectively, comparing to the same period 2015.

On 27 October 2019, Malaysia Airlines ceased its operation between Kuala Lumpur and Nanjing despite great passenger traffic performance in an effort to readjust its operation model overseas.

In 2020, Finnair ceased its operation between Helenski and Nanjing due to the Coronavirus outbreak.

== Composition ==
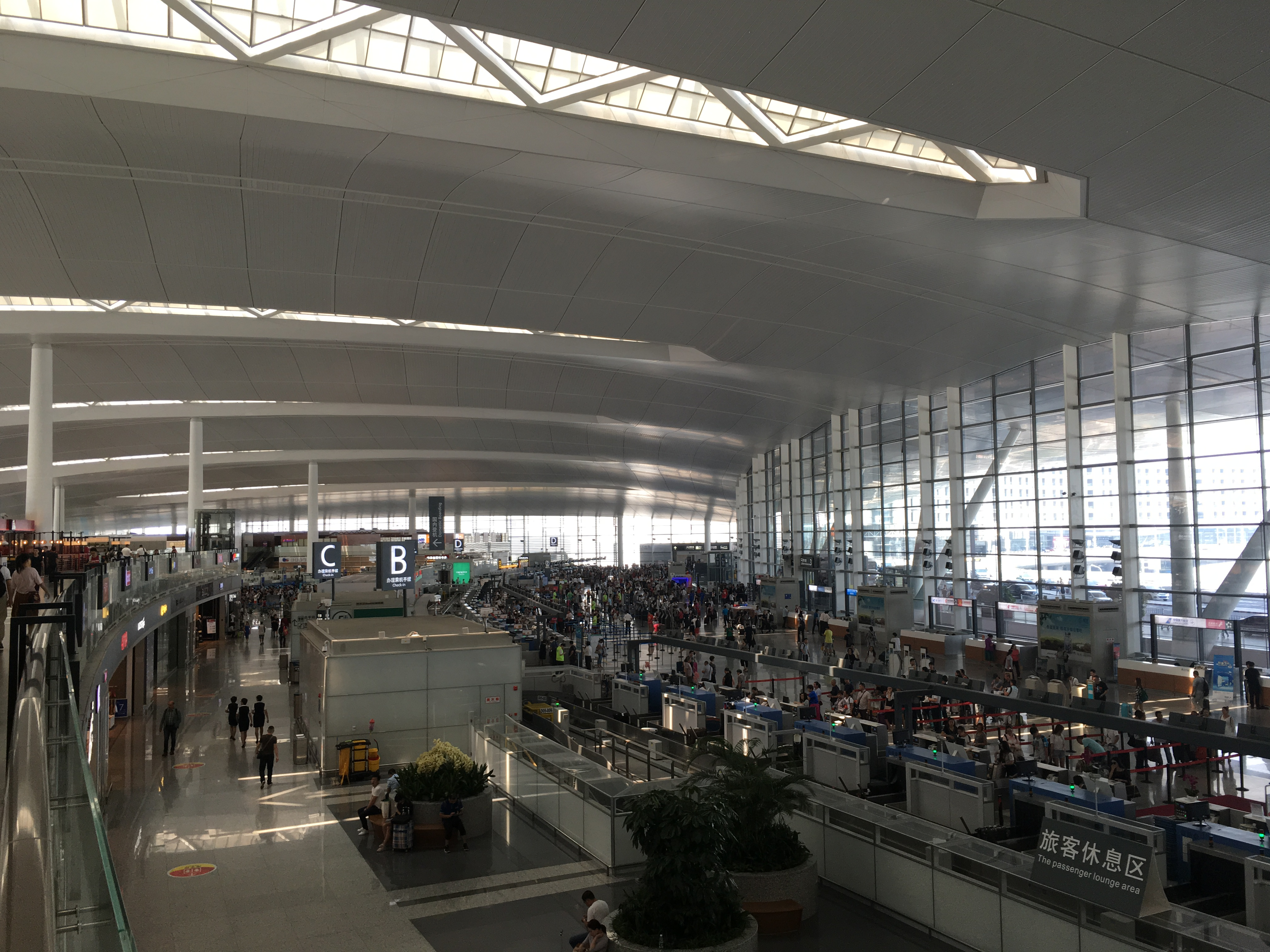
Interior of NKG T2

The airport consists of two terminals, two 3600-meter runways (paralleled by three taxiways and connected by two taxiways), two control towers, a cargo center, a transportation center, and an apron. Adjacent to, but not belonging to, the airport is the China Post express logistics center and the base for China Postal Airlines.

The older section of the airport consists of:

- Terminal 1 (floor space 160,000m^{2}, 80 check-in counters and 33 security lanes.
- one northern runway (length 3600 m, width 60 m, 4E rating)
- one runway (length 3600 m, width 45 m)
- a cargo center (34,000m^{2})
- an apron (447,000m^{2})
- a control tower (height 87 m)

Terminal 1 was closed on 14 July 2014 for renovation, it reopened on 29 July 2020 and serves all domestic flights except China Eastern Airlines and Juneyao Air flights which depart exclusively from Terminal 2.

The Phase 2 expansion includes:

- Terminal 2 (263,000m^{2} floor space, 35 boarding bridges, annual capacity 18 million passengers)
- a new 4F-rating southern runway and two parallel taxiways
- two taxiways connecting the northern and southern runways
- 20 aircraft parking positions
- a second control tower (height 107 m)
- an 11,000m^{2} carpark
- a transportation center, which seats a subway station, a coach station, a Pullman Hotel, and shopping and dining facilities

The two terminals are also connected by the transportation center structure.

== Airlines and destinations ==
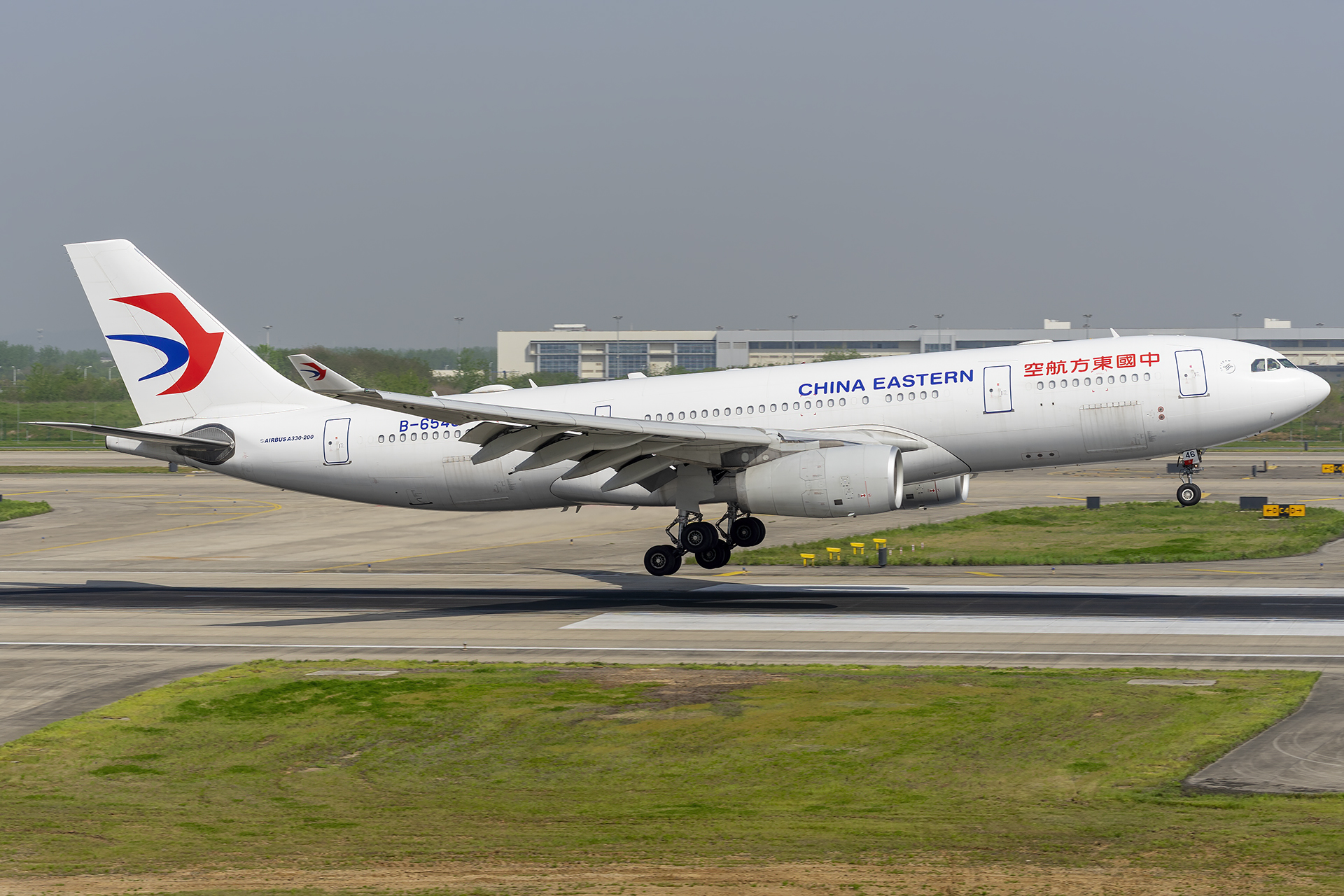
China Eastern Airlines Airbus A330-243 landing on Runway 07 of NKG

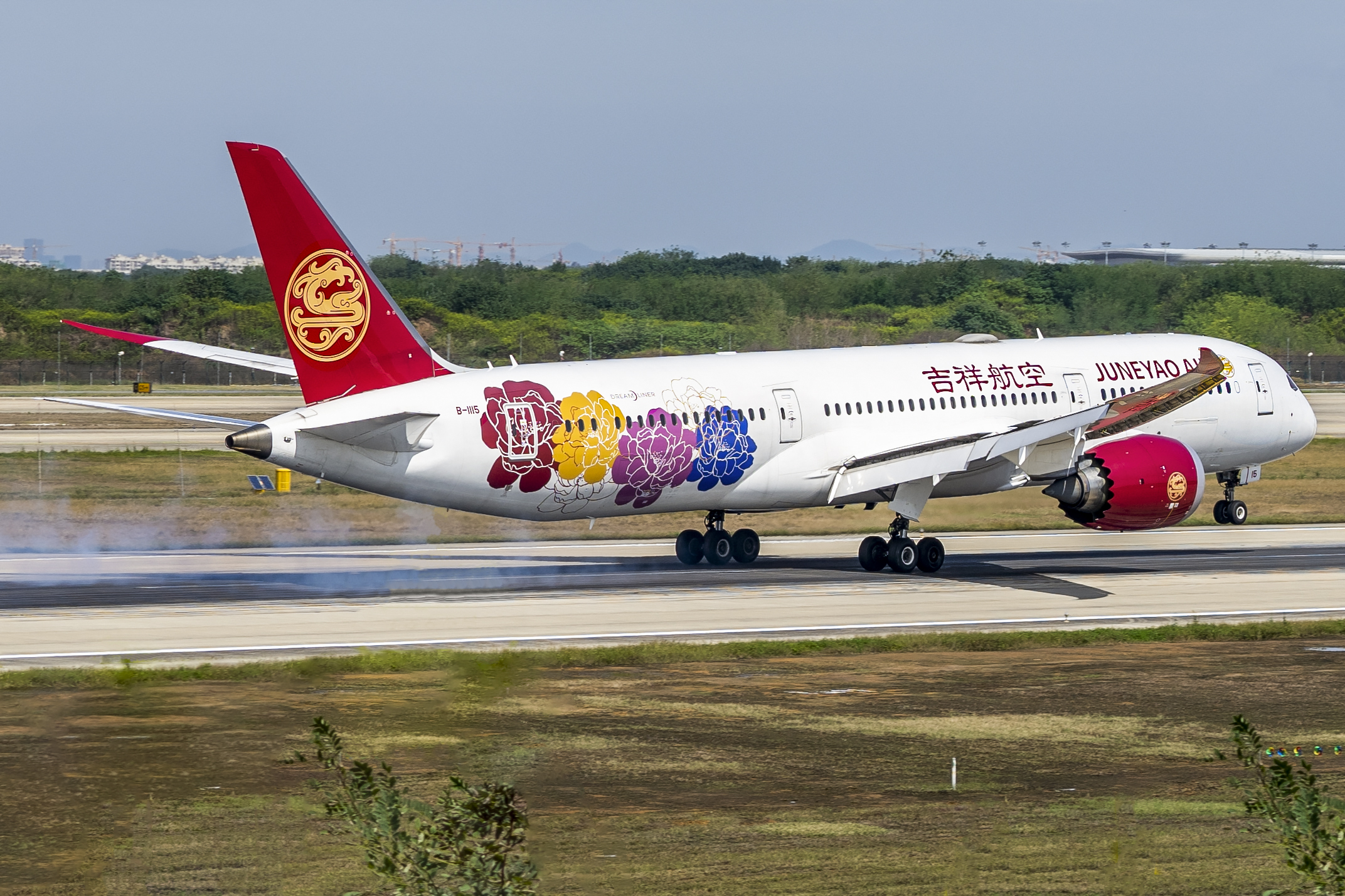
Juneyao Air Boeing 787-9 Dreamliner in "Chinese Peony (梦旅生花)" special colours operating the Osaka to Nanjing route landing on runway 07 of NKG

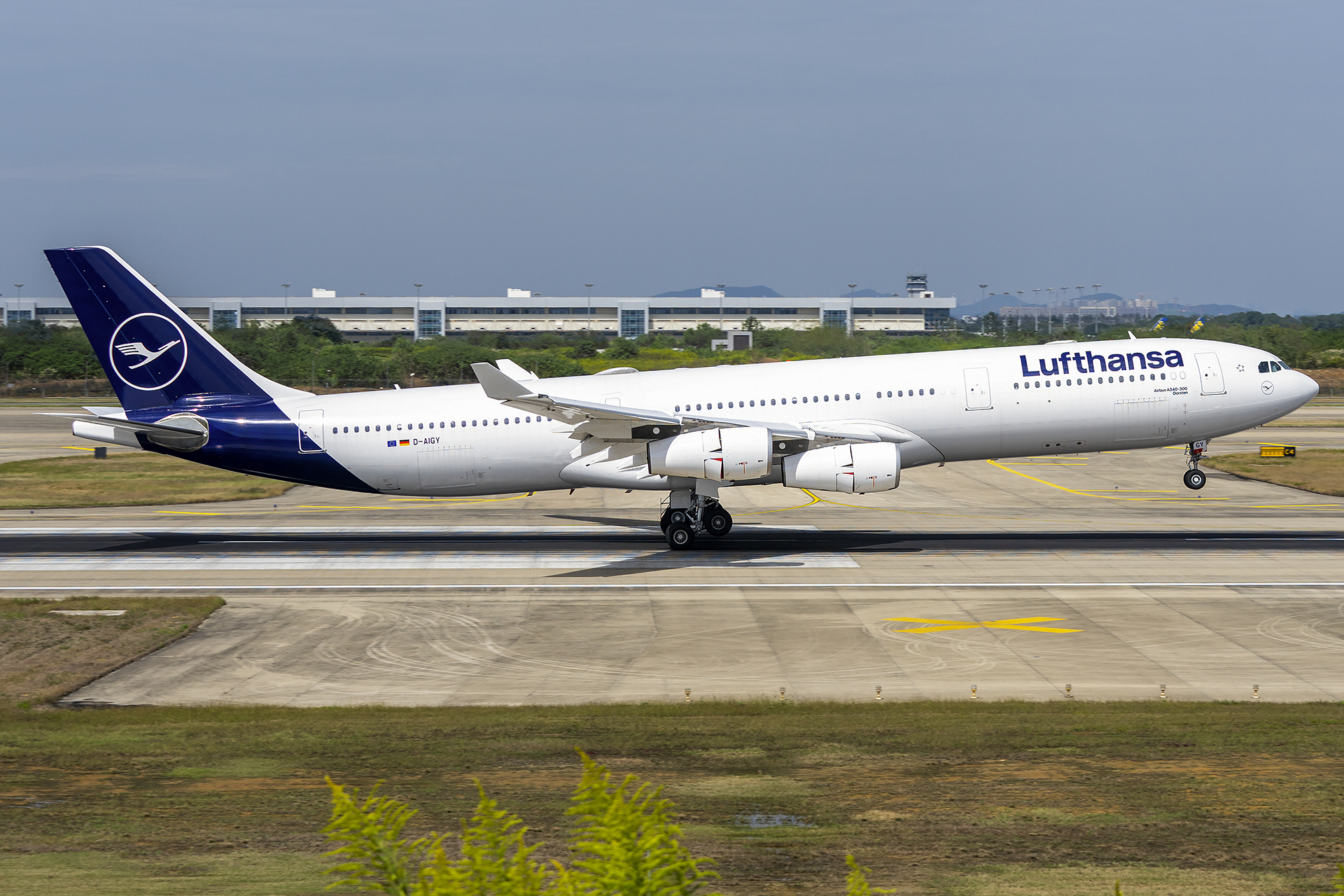
Lufthansa Airbus A340-313 landing on runway 07 of NKG

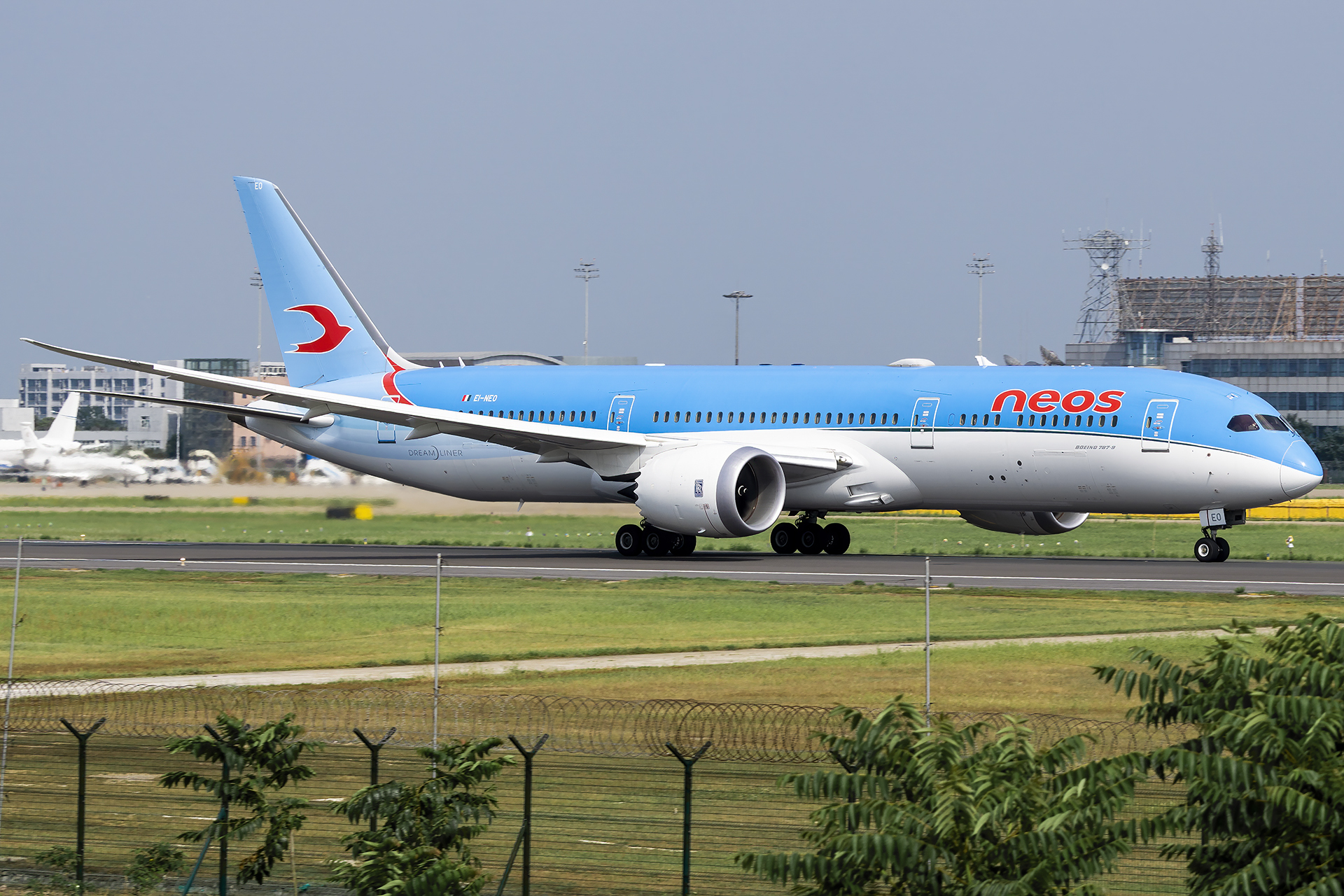
Neos Boeing 787-9 Dreamliner taxiing in NKG

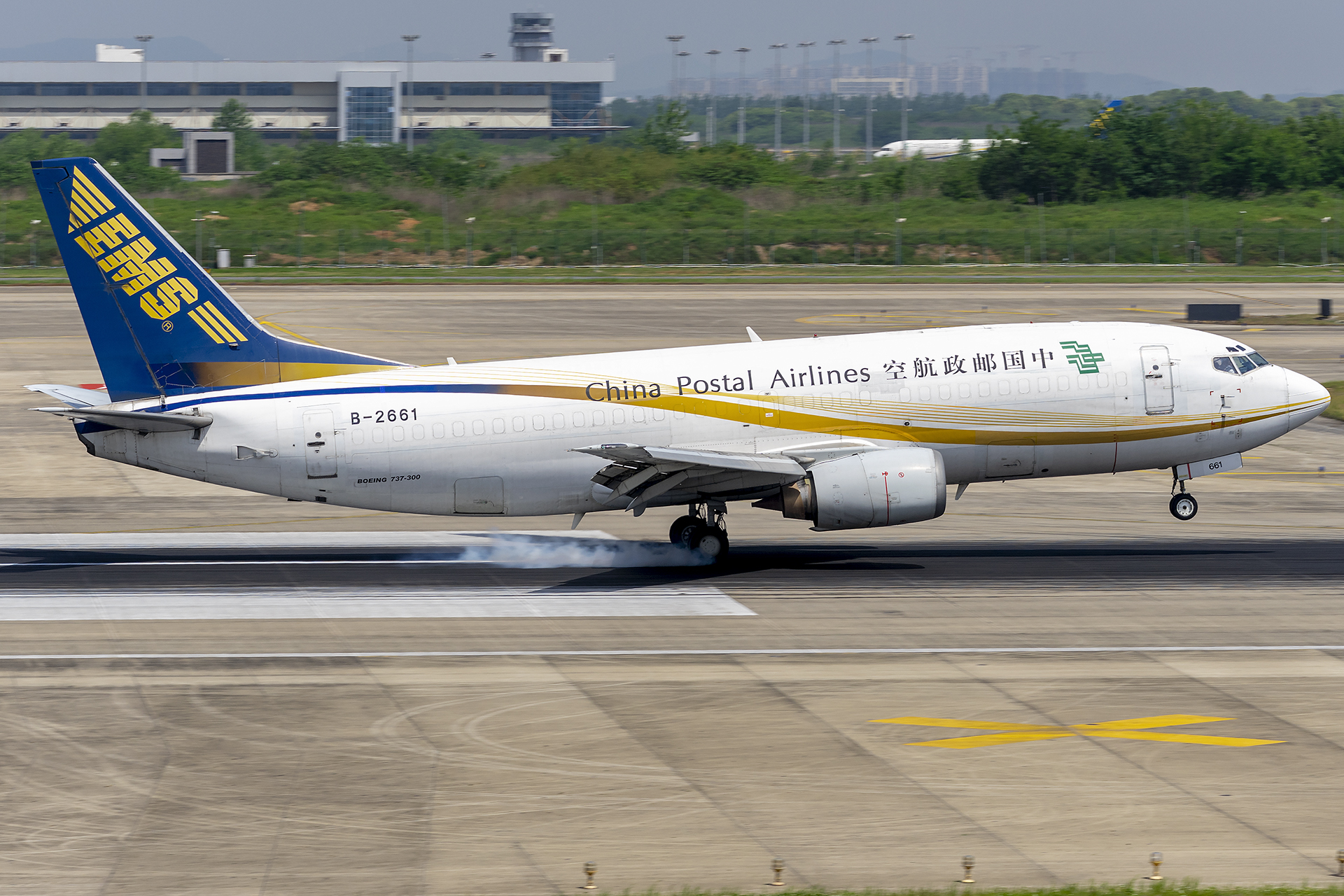
China Postal Airlines Boeing 737-3Q8(SF) landing on runway 07 of NKG

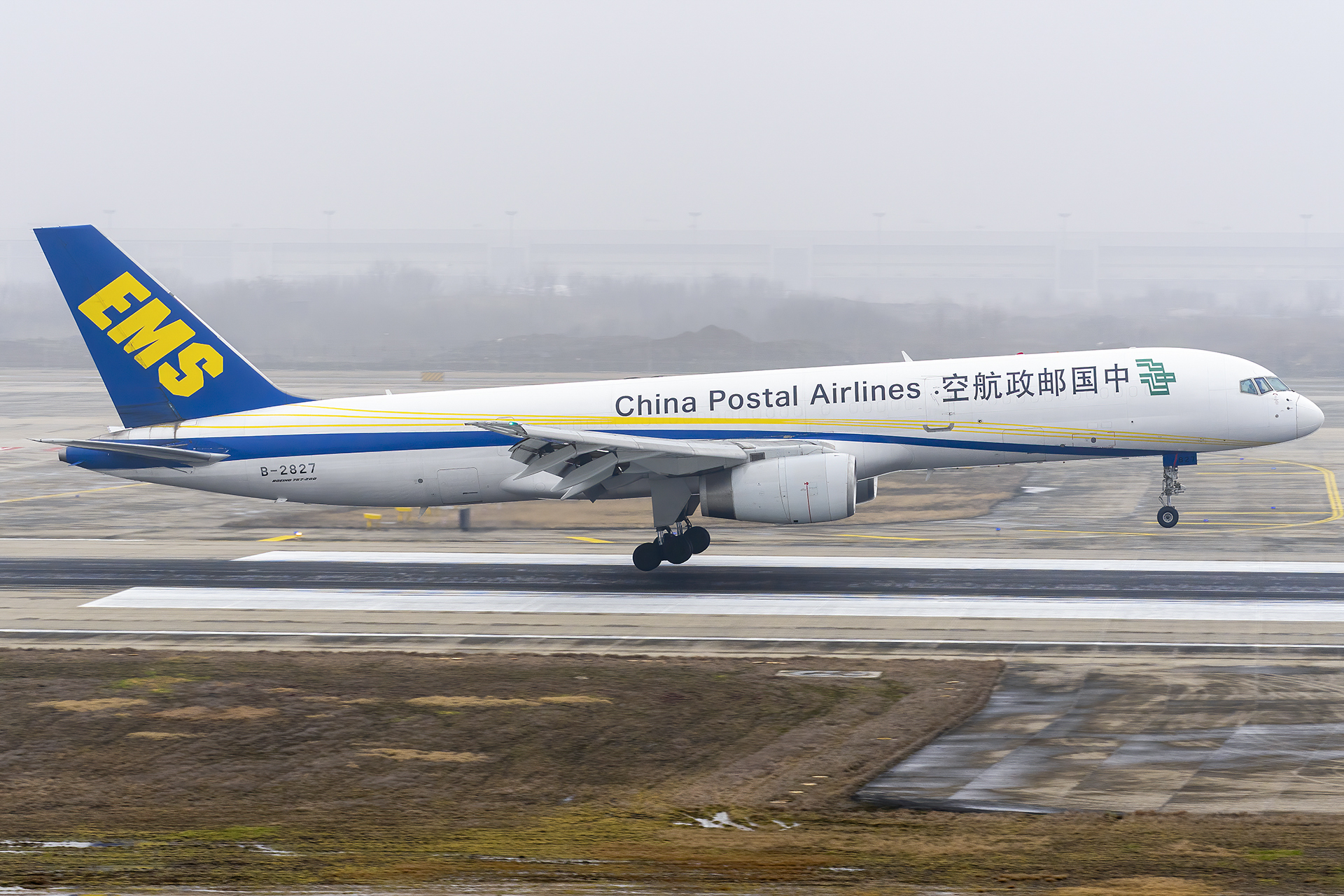
China Postal Airlines Boeing 757-2Y0(PCF) landing on runway 07 of NKG

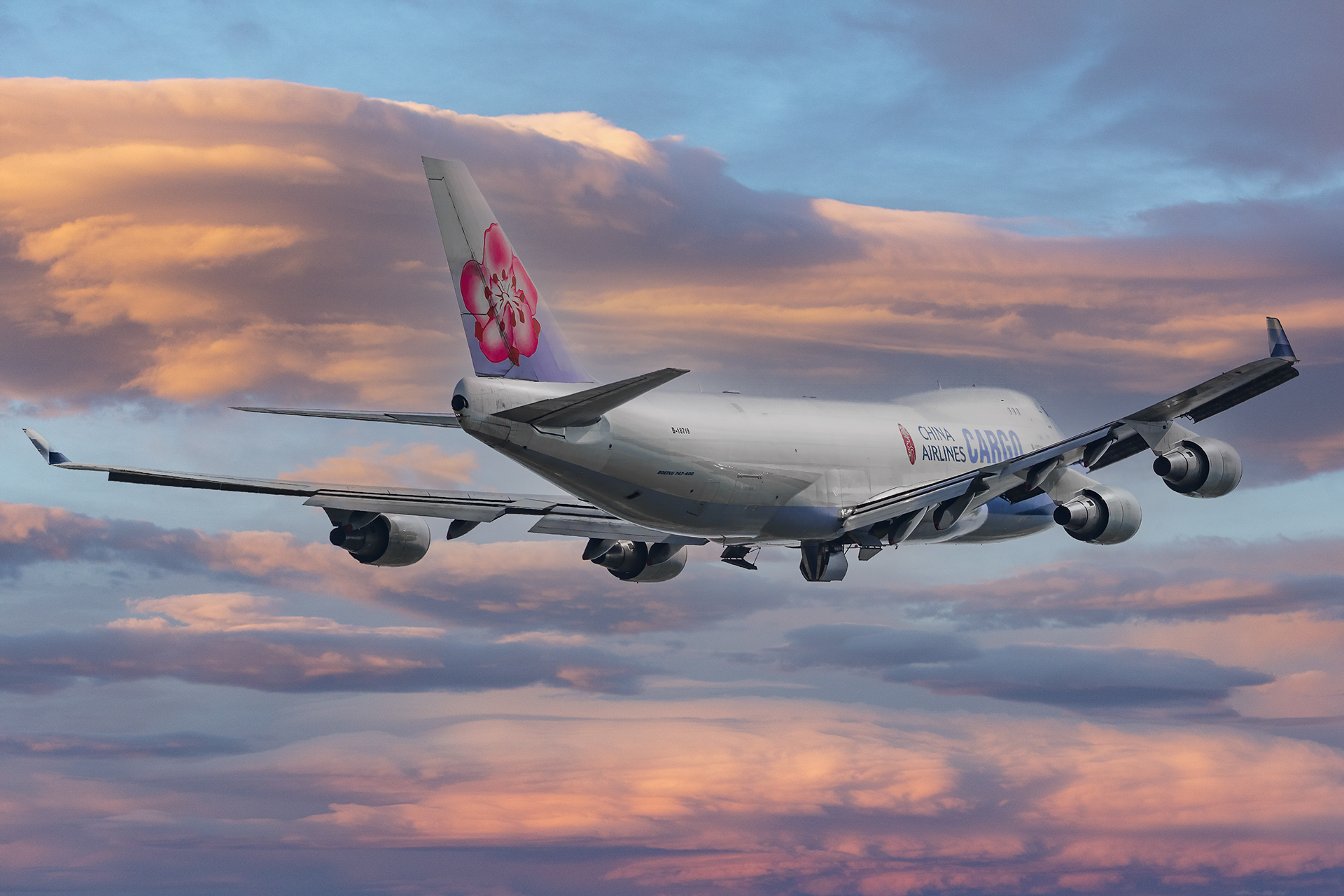
China Airlines Cargo Boeing 747-409F Departing from NKG

=== Passenger ===
Airlines	Destinations
9 Air	Liupanshui, Taiyuan, Xingyi
Air Macau	Macau
Air Travel	Baoshan, Kunming, Liancheng, Shenzhen, Tongren, Xining
Asiana Airlines	Seoul–Incheon
Beijing Capital Airlines	Chenzhou, Shiyan, Ürümqi, Yan'an, Yinchuan
Cathay Pacific	Hong Kong
Chengdu Airlines	Chengdu–Tianfu, Dalian, Hohhot
China Eastern Airlines	Beihai, Busan, Dunhuang, Fuzhou, Guilin, Ho Chi Minh City, Hong Kong, Jieyang, Jinggangshan, Kuala Lumpur–International, Mangshi, Melbourne, Nanning, Singapore, Sydney, Taichung, Yanji, Yibin, Zhangjiajie, Zhanjiang, Zhuhai, Zunyi–Xinzhou
China Express Airlines	Chengdu–Tianfu, Luliang, Xi'an, Yan'an
China Southern Airlines	Jieyang, Nanning, Shenyang, Zhuhai
Colorful Guizhou Airlines	Guiyang,
Donghai Airlines	Zhuhai
Hainan Airlines	Lanzhou, Hohhot
Hebei Airlines	Shenyang, Shijiazhuang
Hong Kong Airlines	Hong Kong
Juneyao Air	Bangkok–Suvarnabhumi, Changchun, Dalian, Guilin, Hong Kong, Huizhou, Kobe, Linfen, Liuzhou, Nanning, Osaka–Kansai, Sanya, Urumqi, Zhuhai
Korean Air	Seoul–Incheon
Kunming Airlines	Guiyang, Huaihua, Taiyuan
Lucky Air	Bazhong, Chengdu–Tianfu, Lijiang
Nok Air	Bangkok–Don Mueang
Okay Airways	Guilin
Qingdao Airlines	Changchun, Haikou, Sanya
Royal Air Philippines	Charter: Caticlan
Scoot	Singapore
Shandong Airlines	Guilin, Yantai, Zhuhai
Shanghai Airlines	Changchun, Jieyang
Shenzhen Airlines	Chengdu–Tianfu, Fuzhou, Lanzhou, Lijiang, Nanning, Quanzhou, Shenyang, Zhanjiang, Zhuhai
Sichuan Airlines	Luzhou, Zhangjiajie
Spring Airlines	Jieyang, Kuala Lumpur–International,
Suparna Airlines	Shenzhen
Tianjin Airlines	Hengyang, Huizhou, Yantai
Urumqi Air	Hanzhong, Nanchong
West Air	Chaoyang, Jieyang, Kunming, Quanzhou, Wulong
XiamenAir	Dalian, Fuzhou, Hanoi, Harbin, Jakarta–Soekarno-Hatta, Kuala Lumpur, Quanzhou, Shenyang, Singapore, Yuncheng
Xizang Airlines	Dali, Lhasa, Mianyang, Xi'an, Yichang

=== Cargo ===
Airlines	Destinations
Royal Air Philippines	Clark
Suparna Airlines	Moscow–Zhukovsky

== Ground transportation ==
=== Airport shuttle ===
==== City to airport ====
- From Nanjing South Railway Station: 6:00–21:00, every 20 minutes, duration 40 minutes
- From Nanjing Railway Station East Square (with a stop at 221 Middle Longpan Road): 5:40–21:00, every 20 minutes, duration 80 minutes

==== Airport to city ====
- Line 1: 30 minutes after the first landing to the last landing of the day (stops: Yuhua Square, Qinhong Bridge, Xihuamen, Nanjing railway station); max. interval 30 minutes
- Line 2: 9:30–22:30 (stops: Cuipingshan Hotel, Nanjing South railway station, Zhonghuamen Subway Station), max. interval 30 minutes

=== Expressway ===
The airport is accessed by Konggang Road, which connects to the Airport Expressway. The Airport Expressway is part of S55 Ningxuan (Nanjing-Xuancheng) Expressway.

=== Rail ===
The Lukou Airport Station on Line S1 of the Nanjing Metro links the airport with Nanjing South Railway Station. Operation hours are from 6:00 to 22:40 (in both directions), at 9'57" intervals in peak hours and 13'16" intervals in low hours. The entire journey takes approximately 35 minutes and costs 7 RMB. At Nanjing South railway station, passengers can transfer to high-speed trains to other cities, coach services to nearby towns, Nanjing Metro Line 1, Nanjing Metro Line 3, Nanjing Metro Line S3 and bus services.

=== Taxi ===
Taxis are easily accessible outside the arrivals hall.

== See also ==
- Nanjing Dajiaochang Airport
- Nanjing Liuhe Airport
- List of airports in China
- List of the busiest airports in the People's Republic of China
