= Lukou International Airport station =

Metro station in Nanjing, China

Lukou International Airport 禄口机场

General information
- Location: Jiangning District, Nanjing, Jiangsu; China
- Operator: Nanjing Metro Co. Ltd.
- Line: Line S1
- Connections: Nanjing Lukou International Airport

Construction
- Structure type: Underground

History
- Opened: 1 July 2014; 12 years ago

Services
Preceding station	Nanjing Metro	Following station
Xiangyulunan towards Nanjing South Railway Station	Line S1	Konggangxinchengjiangning Terminus
Location

Lukou International Airport station (Chinese: 禄口机场站) is a station of Line S1 of the Nanjing Metro. It started operations on 1 July 2014.

== Gallery ==
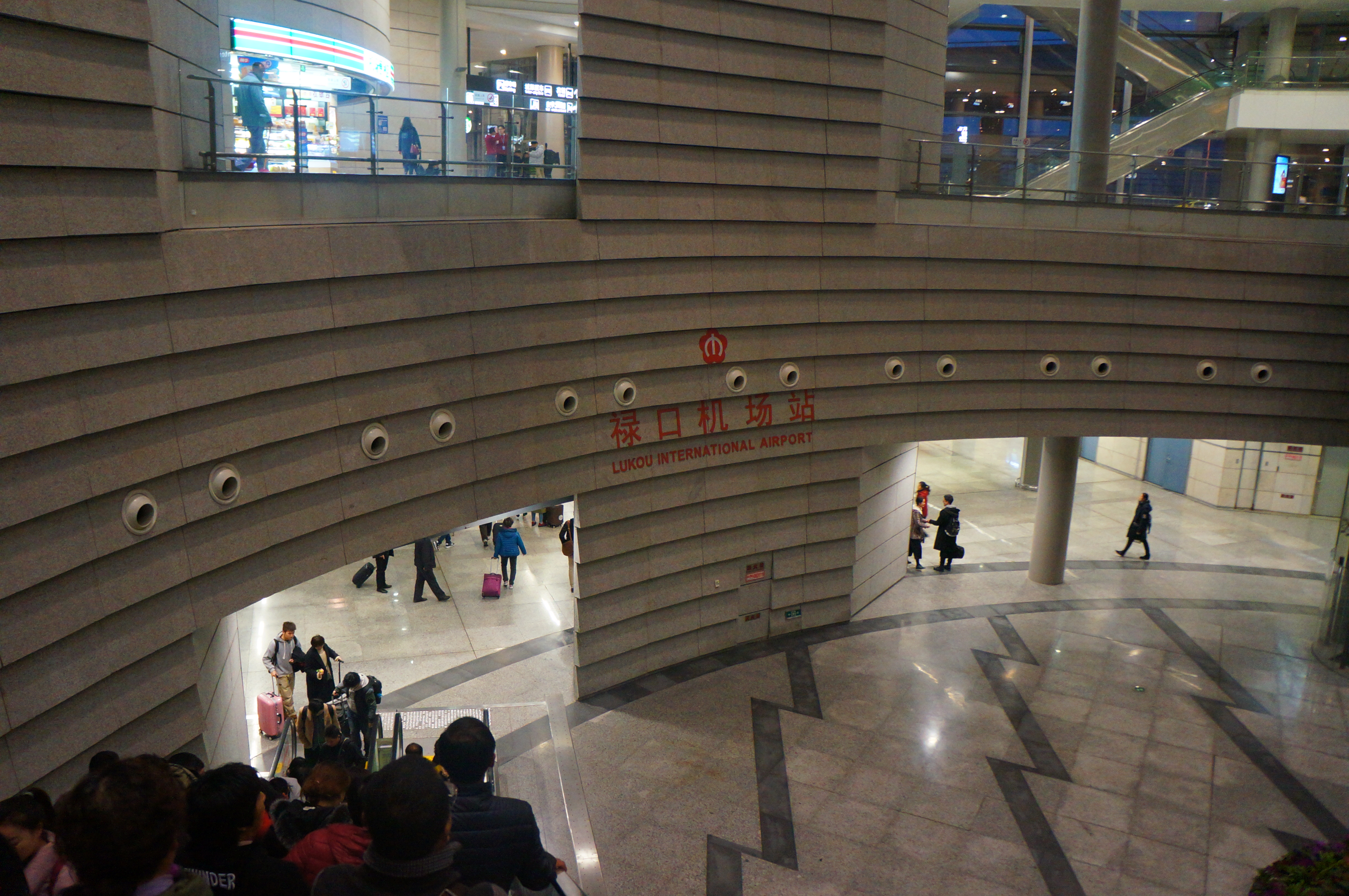
Entrance

Concourse

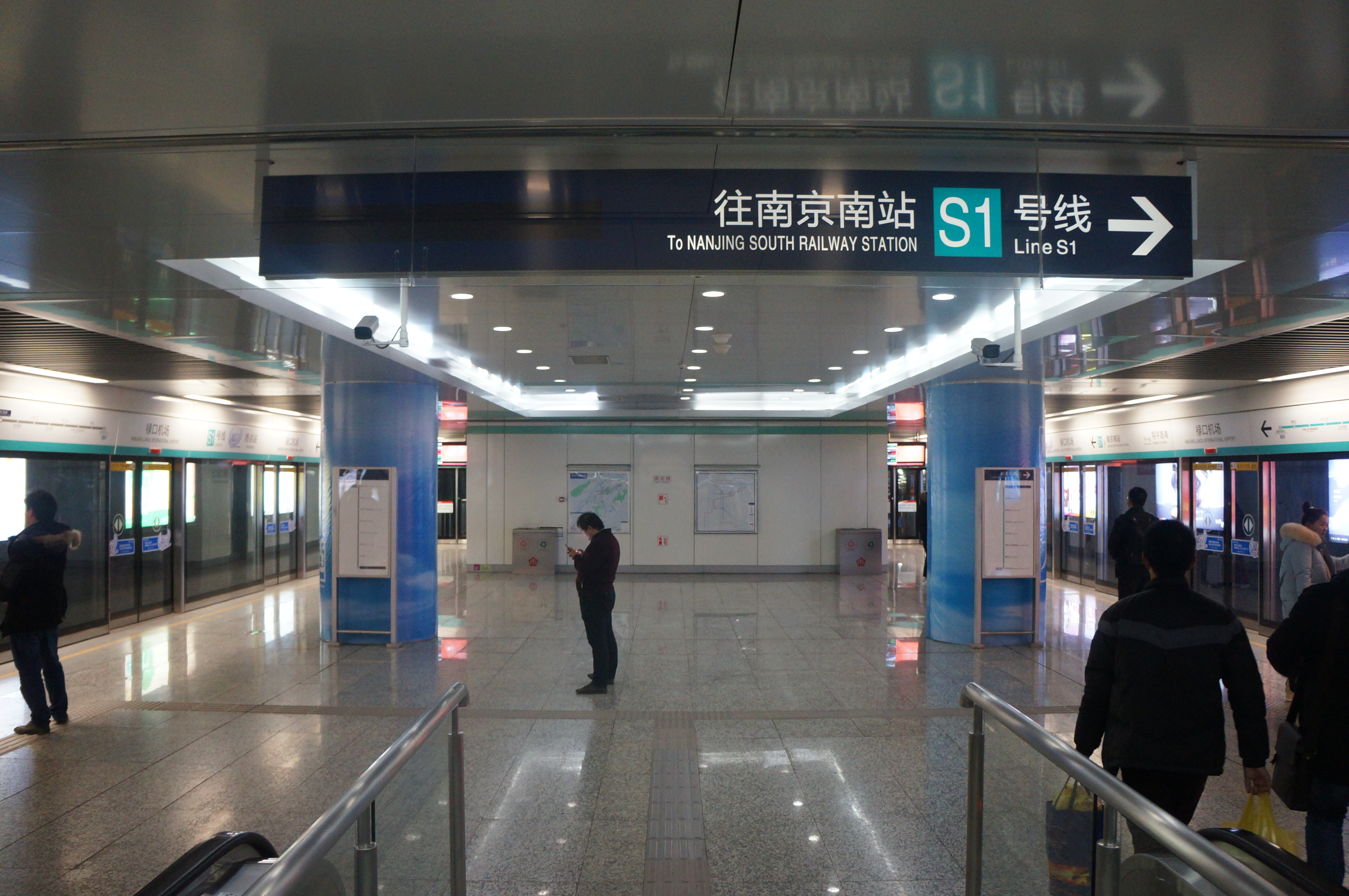
Platform
