= Lishui, Nanjing =

Lishui 溧水区
- District
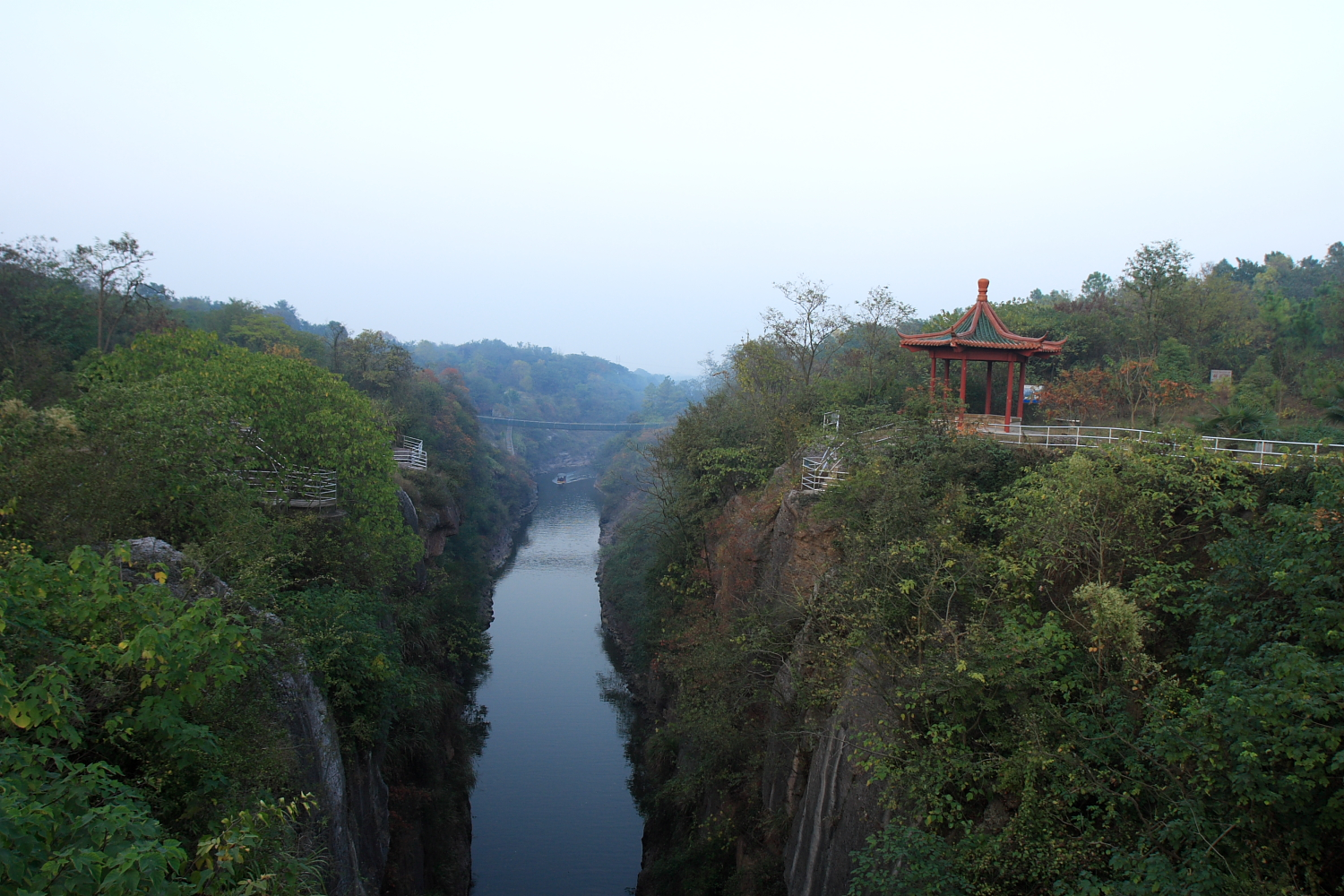

- Location in Jiangsu
- Coordinates: 31°35′07″N 119°02′01″E
- Country: People's Republic of China
- Province: Jiangsu
- Sub-provincial city: Nanjing

Area
  - Total: 1,067 km^{2} (412 sq mi)

Population (2023)
  - Total: 509,400
  - Density: 477.4/km^{2} (1,236/sq mi)
- Time zone: UTC+8 (China Standard)
- Postal code: 211200
Nanjing district map
Subdivisions of Nanjing, Jiangsu
City Proper
1	Xuanwu
2	Qinhuai
3	Jianye
4	Gulou
5	Yuhuatai
6	Qixia
Suburban
7	Jiangning
8	Pukou
9	Luhe
Rural
10	Lishui
11	Gaochun

Lishui District (simplified Chinese: 溧水区; traditional Chinese: 溧水區; pinyin: Lìshuǐ Qū), formerly Lishui County (simplified Chinese: 溧水县; traditional Chinese: 溧水縣; pinyin: Lìshuǐ xiàn) until January 2013, is one of 11 districts of Nanjing, Jiangsu province, China.

The district is south-east of Jiangning District and north of Gaochun District. It is predominantly rural.

== History ==
- In 1122 BC, King Wu of Zhou conquered Yin and enfeoffed the princes. He granted Zhou Zhang the rulership of Wu (吳) which included Lishui.
- In the 11th year of the founding of the Sui dynasty (591), Lishui County was established in the northwest of Liyang and the eastern part of Danyang (now Xiaodanyang, Jiangning). This was the beginning of the establishment of Lishui County.
- In the first year of Yuanzhen (1295) of the Yuan dynasty, Lishui County was promoted to Lishui Prefecture, which belonged to Jiqing Circuit (today's Nanjing).
- In the second year of Hongwu in the Ming dynasty (1369), Lishui Prefecture was changed to Lishui County, which belonged to Yingtian Prefecture (today's Nanjing).
- On April 25, 1949, Lishui implemented a district system and belonged to the Zhenjiang District of the Southern Jiangsu Administrative Office.
- In May 1949, Lishui County began to establish grassroots people's political power. By the end of 1949, a total of 55 townships and 438 administrative villages had been established in the county.
- In June 1955, the county party committee decided to cancel the establishment of the Sixth District of Lishui County. The county consists of 7 districts, 1 town and 61 townships. The names of each district were changed to the names of the places where they are located, namely: Baima District, Fangbian District, Zhetang District, Honglan District, Shiqiu District, Kongzhen District, and Xinqiao District.
- In February 2013, with the approval of the provincial government, Lishui County was abolished and Lishui District of Nanjing City was established. The administrative area of the original Lishui County was the administrative area of Lishui District of Nanjing City. Since then, Lishui has ended its 1422-year county history.
- In July 2015, Yongyang Town and Zhetang Town in Lishui District were abolished and Yongyang Street and Zhetang Street were established respectively.
- In May 2018, Dongping Street, Honglan Street and Shiqiu Street were established in Dongping Town, Honglan Town and Shiqiu Town in Lishui District.

== Administrative divisions ==
In the present, Lishui District has 8 towns and 2 others.

8 Towns

- Yongyang (永阳街道)
- Zhetang (柘塘街道)
- Honglan (洪蓝街道)
- Shiqiu (石湫街道)
- Dongping (东屏街道)
- Baima (白马镇)
- Hefeng (和凤镇)
- Jingqiao (晶桥镇)

2 Others

- Lishui Development Zone (溧水开发区)
- Lishui County Forestry (溧水县林场)

== Economy ==
In 2022, Lishui District will achieve a regional GDP of 103.401 billion yuan, an increase of 2.6% over the same period last year based on comparable prices. Among them, the added value of the primary industry was 5.374 billion yuan, a year-on-year increase of 3.1%; the added value of the secondary industry was 54.446 billion yuan, a year-on-year increase of 5.0%, of which: the industrial added value was 46.751 billion yuan, a year-on-year increase of 5.2%; the tertiary industry added value was 435.81 billion, a year-on-year decrease of 0.4%; the per capita disposable income of all residents was 53,200 yuan, a year-on-year increase of 4.6%. Among them, the per capita disposable income of urban residents was 67,214 yuan, a year-on-year increase of 3.6%; the per capita disposable income of rural residents was 34,018 yuan, a year-on-year increase of 6.2%.

== Climate ==
Lishui has a north subtropical monsoon climate with four distinct seasons, with hot and humid summers and cold and dry winters. The annual average temperature is 16.4°C, the annual average relative humidity is 76%, the annual average precipitation is 1204.3 mm, the annual average rainy days are 123 days, and the annual average sunshine is 1980.0 hours. The rainy season is from mid-to-late June to early July every year.

Climate data for Lishui, elevation 30 m (98 ft), (1991–2020 normals, extremes 1981–2010)
Month	Jan	Feb	Mar	Apr	May	Jun	Jul	Aug	Sep	Oct	Nov	Dec	Year
Record high °C (°F)	20.6 (69.1)	28.6 (83.5)	30.1 (86.2)	33.4 (92.1)	36.4 (97.5)	37.2 (99.0)	39.0 (102.2)	40.2 (104.4)	37.7 (99.9)	32.6 (90.7)	29.0 (84.2)	21.9 (71.4)	40.2 (104.4)
Mean daily maximum °C (°F)	7.5 (45.5)	10.2 (50.4)	15.1 (59.2)	21.4 (70.5)	26.6 (79.9)	29.1 (84.4)	32.6 (90.7)	32.1 (89.8)	28.0 (82.4)	22.9 (73.2)	16.8 (62.2)	10.1 (50.2)	21.0 (69.9)
Daily mean °C (°F)	3.3 (37.9)	5.6 (42.1)	10.2 (50.4)	16.2 (61.2)	21.5 (70.7)	25.0 (77.0)	28.5 (83.3)	27.9 (82.2)	23.6 (74.5)	18.0 (64.4)	11.7 (53.1)	5.4 (41.7)	16.4 (61.5)
Mean daily minimum °C (°F)	0.2 (32.4)	2.1 (35.8)	6.2 (43.2)	11.7 (53.1)	17.2 (63.0)	21.5 (70.7)	25.2 (77.4)	24.8 (76.6)	20.1 (68.2)	14.1 (57.4)	7.8 (46.0)	1.9 (35.4)	12.7 (54.9)
Record low °C (°F)	−12.1 (10.2)	−9.6 (14.7)	−5.3 (22.5)	0.8 (33.4)	7.1 (44.8)	12.9 (55.2)	19.3 (66.7)	17.2 (63.0)	10.2 (50.4)	1.8 (35.2)	−4.5 (23.9)	−14.0 (6.8)	−14.0 (6.8)
Average precipitation mm (inches)	61.7 (2.43)	64.1 (2.52)	91.8 (3.61)	90.2 (3.55)	97.6 (3.84)	206.1 (8.11)	206.8 (8.14)	144 (5.7)	86.5 (3.41)	59.6 (2.35)	55.7 (2.19)	40.3 (1.59)	1,204.4 (47.44)
Average precipitation days (≥ 0.1 mm)	10.3	10.3	11.5	10.3	10.9	12.2	11.9	12.2	9.1	7.9	8.6	7.8	123
Average snowy days	3.7	2.6	0.8	0.1	0	0	0	0	0	0	0.3	1.3	8.8
Average relative humidity (%)	76	75	72	71	71	78	79	80	79	76	76	74	76
Mean monthly sunshine hours	122.0	124.2	152.3	180.1	192.6	162.6	212.3	207.5	172.5	170.1	145.7	138.7	1,980.6
Percentage possible sunshine	38	40	41	46	45	38	49	51	47	49	46	44	45
Source: China Meteorological Administration

== Culture ==
- Luoshan dragon, a traditional dragon dance. The Luoshan Dragon originated in the Ming Dynasty and has a history of more than 400 years. It is one of the important folk cultural activities in Luoshan Village, Hefeng Town, Lishui District. The Luoshan Dragon is a huge dragon with a body length of nearly 100 meters. There are as many as 500 participants. It is known as the "Biggest Dragon in the South of the Yangtze River" and is a national intangible cultural heritage. The people of Luoshan Village depend on Shijiu Lake for their livelihood. During the New Year, they sing, dance and dance dragons on the beach.
- Vaulting lantern, Lishui folk have the custom of jumping on horse lanterns during the Spring Festival. The horse lantern is made of bamboo strips, papered on the surface, and candles inserted at the head and tail. There is a gap in the middle of the lantern and it is fixed on the actor's waist during the performance. Horse lanterns, as a local folk entertainment activity, pray for good weather, good harvests, and prosperity.

== Transportation ==
The Nanjing–Hangzhou Passenger Railway crosses Lishui District. As of 2015, about 30 trains a day make a stop at Lishui Station (46 km / 16 minutes away from Nanjing South Railway Station), which is located about five miles east of downtown Lishui. It was completed by the end of 2017 and opened to traffic in 2018. Mainly along S123 and Qinhuai Avenue. Stations include: Konggang New Town Jiangning Station, Zhetang Station, Konggang New Town Lishui Station, Qunli Station, Wolong Lake Station, Lishui Station, Zhongshan Lake Station, Xingzhuang Station and Wuxiangshan Station.

== Speciality cuisine ==
=== Hong Lan Royal Pastry ===
During the Qianlong period of the Qing dynasty, Yipin Jade Belt Cake was served as a tribute. When the Qianlong Emperor went to the south of the Yangtze River, the local county magistrate offered cakes to the emperor as tribute. According to legend, in March 1757 AD, the Qianlong Emperor made his third southern tour and after eating the food, Longyan was delighted and said: "The jade belt is a first-class product." After returning to the capital, he often tasted it with his beloved concubines in the back garden, winning the beauty with a peach blossom face and a smile. Normally open. Since then, "Yipin Jade Belt Cake" has become famous all over the world.

== Celebrities related to Lishui ==
- Bian Zhilin, (1910-2000), whose ancestral home is Lishui, Nanjing. He once used the pen name Ji Ling. He is a poet (one of the "Three Poets of Hanyuan"), literary critic and translator. During the Anti-Japanese War, he taught in various places and was once a student of Xu Zhimo. "Broken Chapter" is his immortal masterpiece. He has extensive knowledge of Shakespeare and is a professor of Spanish. He is considered a representative poet of the Crescent School and Modern School, important poetry schools in the New Culture Movement.
- Li Jianzhen (1907-1992) was director of the Jiangsu-Anhui regional Communist Party school in Lishui from 1940 to 1944 during the Anti-Japanese War of Resistance. She was known locally as "big sister". She also served as Party secretary for Lishui for four months in 1943-1944.
