= Wuxiangshan station =

Nanjing Metro station

Wuxiangshan 无想山
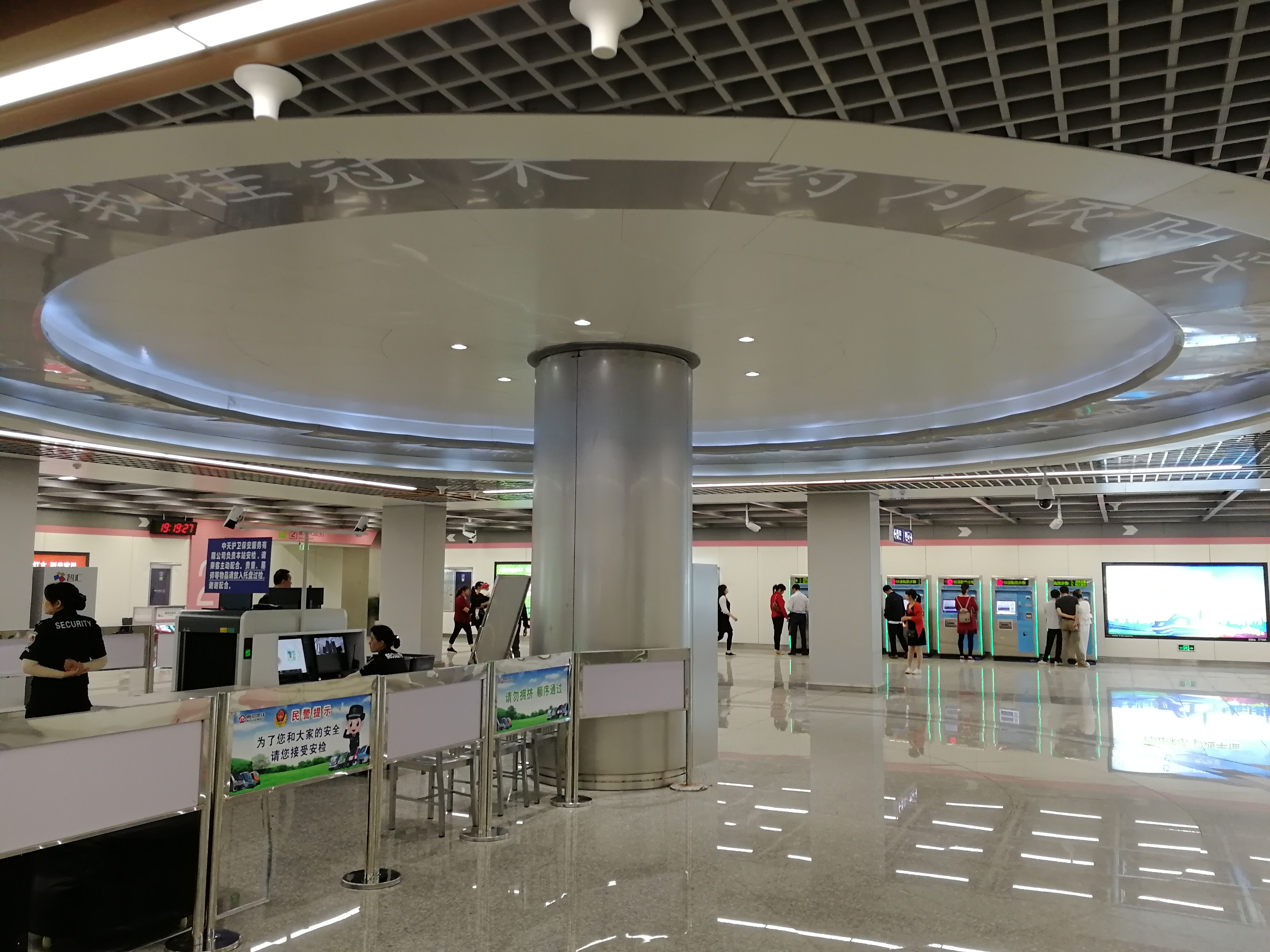
- Concourse area of Wuxiangshan station

General information
- Location: Lishui District, Nanjing, Jiangsu; China
- Coordinates: 31°36′41″N 119°02′48″E
- Line: Line S7

Construction
- Structure type: Underground

History
- Opened: 26 May 2018

Services
Preceding station	Nanjing Metro	Following station
Xingzhuang towards Konggangxinchengjiangning	Line S7	Terminus
Location

Wuxiangshan station (simplified Chinese: 无想山站; traditional Chinese: 無想山站; pinyin: Wúxiǎngshān Zhàn) is a station on the southern terminus of the suburban Line S7 of the Nanjing Metro. It commenced operations along with the rest of the line on 26 May 2018. Rides from here to Nanjing South Railway Station along Line S7 and the connecting Line S1 typically take around 75 minutes.
