= Konggangxinchengjiangning station =

Nanjing Metro interchange station

Konggangxinchengjiangning 空港新城江宁
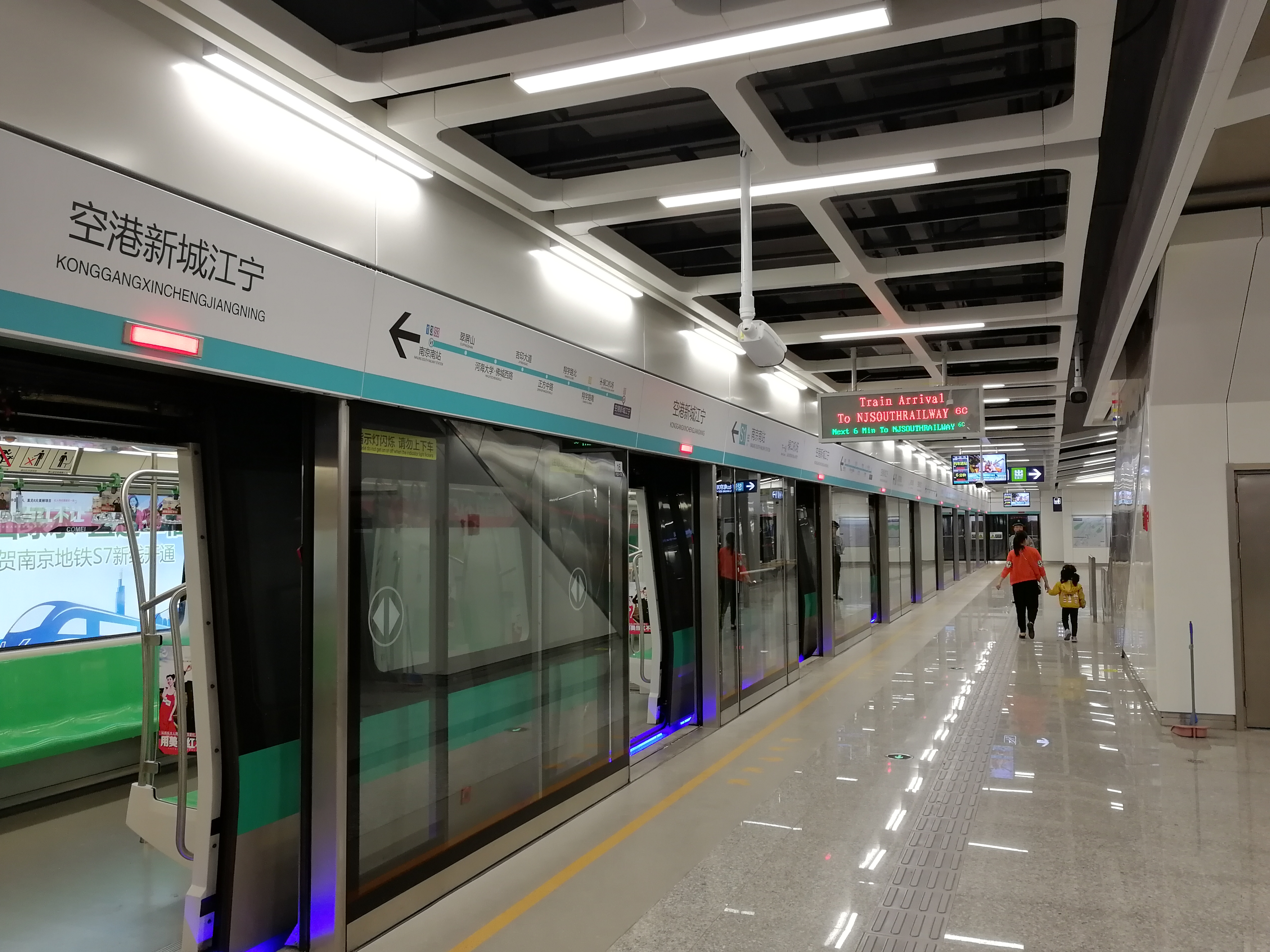
- Line S1 platform

General information
- Location: Jiangning District, Nanjing, Jiangsu; China
- Coordinates: 31°44′23″N 118°52′57″E
- Operated by: Nanjing Metro Co. Ltd.
- Lines: Line S1; Line S7
- Platforms: 2

Construction
- Structure type: Underground

History
- Opened: 26 May 2018; 7 years ago

Services
Preceding station	Nanjing Metro	Following station
Lukou International Airport towards Nanjing South Railway Station	Line S1	Terminus
Terminus	Line S7	Zhetang towards Wuxiangshan
Location

Konggangxinchengjiangning station (simplified Chinese: 空港新城江宁站; traditional Chinese: 空港新城江寧站; pinyin: Kōnggǎng Xīnchéng Jiāngníng zhàn; lit. 'Airport New Town Jiangning Station') is a terminal station of Line S1 and a cross-platform interchange station between Line S1 and Line S7 of the Nanjing Metro.

Exits shown in the metro station are listed below:

Exit	Instructions (in Chinese)	Instructions (in English)
1	鲲鹏路	Kunpeng Road
2	禄口机场	Lukou International Airport
