= Smart growth =

Urban planning philosophy

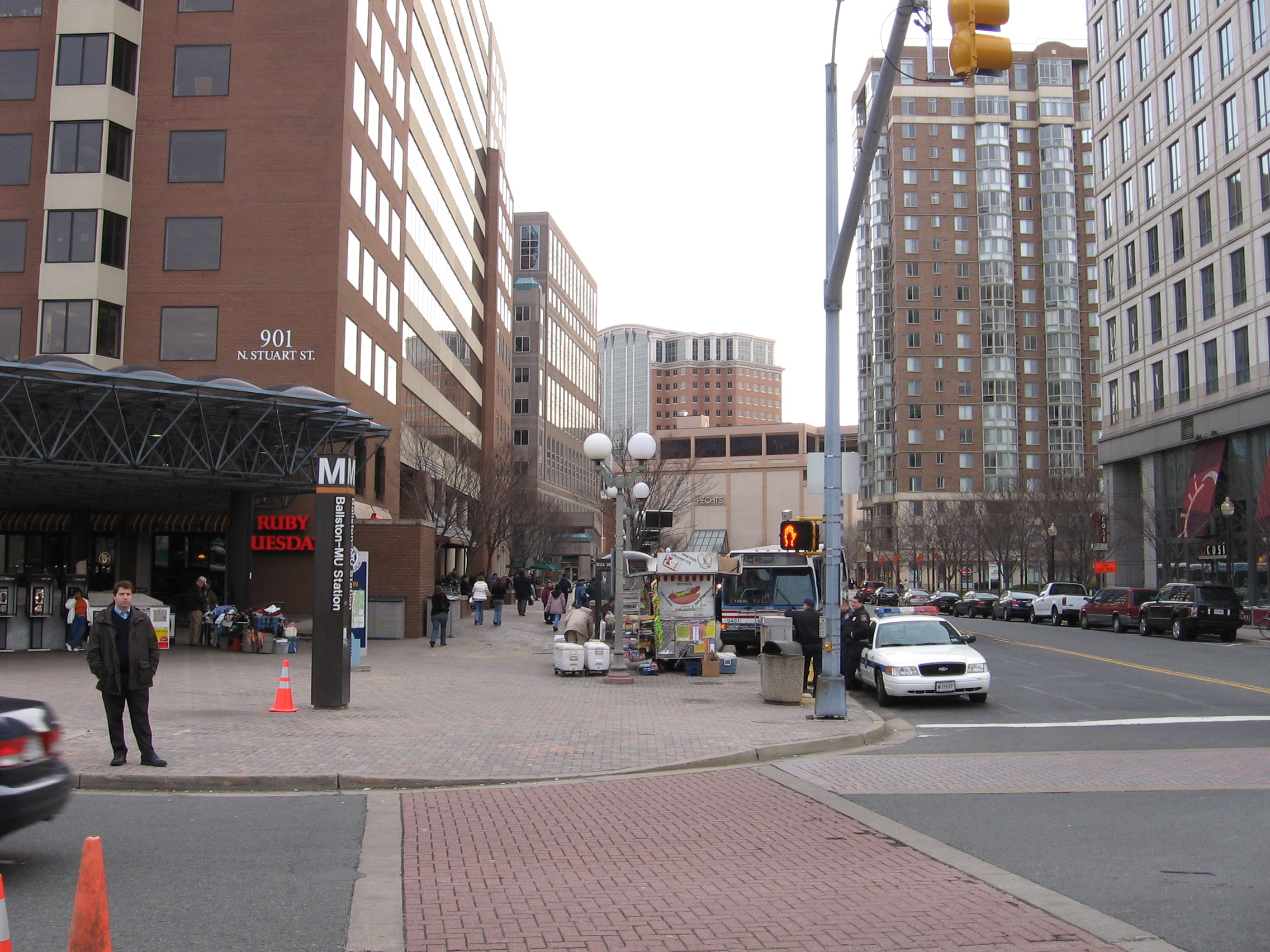
The Ballston neighborhood of Arlington County, Virginia is a transit-oriented development zone, an example of the smart growth concept.

Smart growth is an urban planning and transportation theory that concentrates growth in compact walkable urban centers to avoid sprawl. It also advocates compact, transit-oriented, walkable, bicycle-friendly land use, including neighborhood schools, complete streets, and mixed-use development with a range of housing choices. The term "smart growth" is particularly used in North America. In Europe and particularly the UK, the terms "compact city", "urban densification" or "urban intensification" have often been used to describe similar concepts, which have influenced government planning policies in the UK, the Netherlands and several other European countries.

Smart growth values long-range, regional considerations of sustainability over a short-term focus. Its sustainable development goals are to achieve a unique sense of community and place; expand the range of transportation, employment, and housing choices; equitably distribute the costs and benefits of development; preserve and enhance natural and cultural resources; and promote public health.

== Basic concept ==
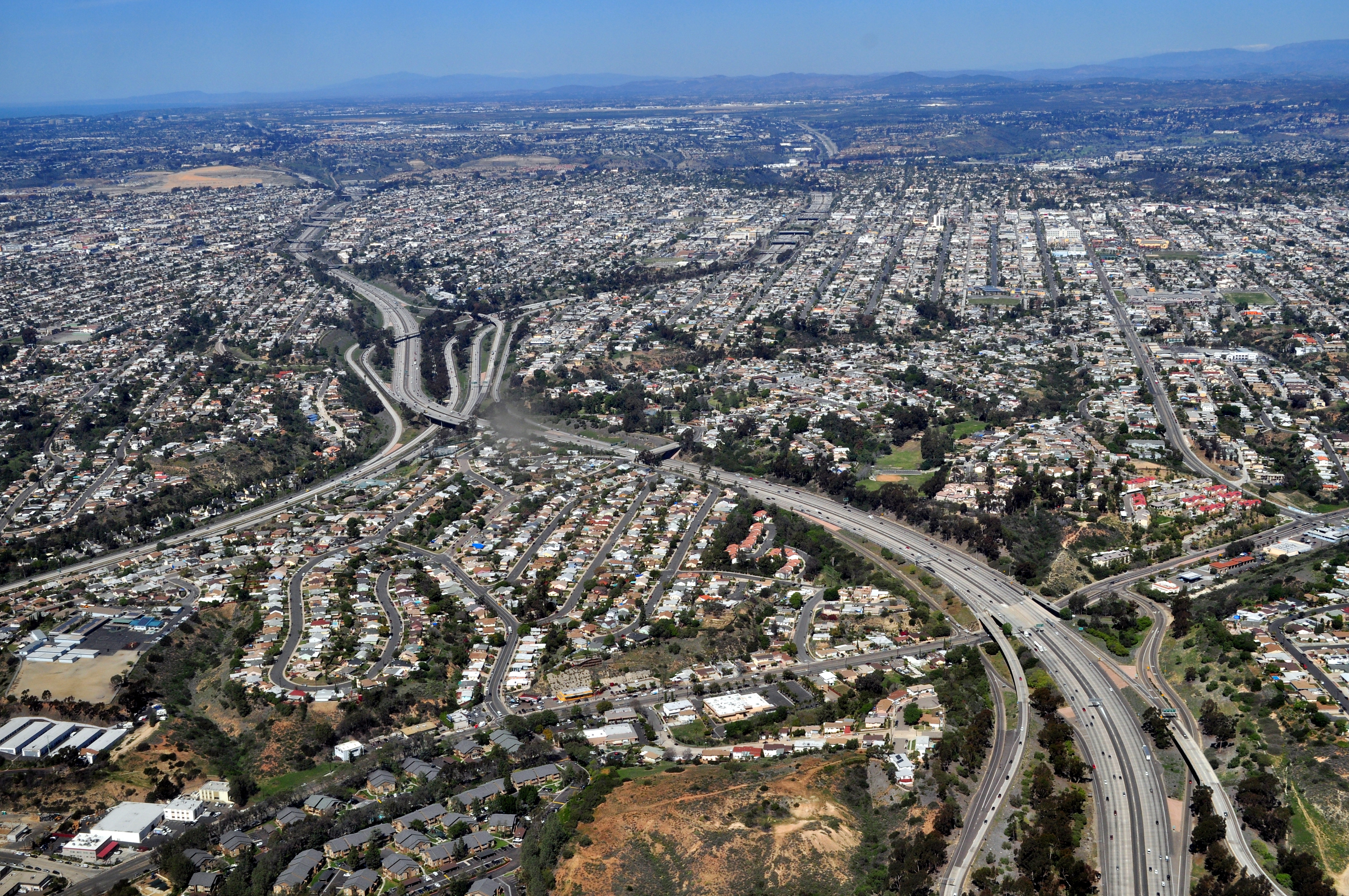
San Diego, California

Smart growth is a theory of land development that accepts that growth and development will continue to occur, and so seeks to direct that growth in an intentional, comprehensive way. Its proponents include urban planners, architects, developers, community activists, and historic preservationists. The term "smart growth" is an attempt to reframe the conversation from "growth" versus "no growth" (or NIMBY) to good/smart growth versus bad/dumb growth. Proponents seek to distinguish smart growth from urban sprawl, which they claim causes most of the problems that fuel opposition to urban growth, such as traffic congestion and environmental degradation. Smart growth principles are directed at developing sustainable communities that provide a greater range of transportation and housing choices and prioritize infill and redevelopment in existing communities rather than development of "greenfield" farmland or natural lands. Some of the fundamental aims for the benefits of residents and the communities are increasing family income and wealth, providing safe walking routes to schools, fostering livable, safe and healthy places, stimulating economic activity (both locally and regionally), and developing, preserving and investing in built and natural resources.

Smart growth "principles" describe the elements of community that are envisioned and smart growth "regulations" describe the various approaches to implementation, that is, how federal, state, and municipal governments choose to fulfill smart growth principles. Some of these regulatory approaches such as urban growth boundaries predate the use of the term "smart growth". One of the earliest efforts to establish smart growth forward as an explicit regulatory framework were put forth by the American Planning Association (APA). In 1997, the APA introduced a project called Growing Smart and published the "Growing Smart Legislative Guidebook: Model Statutes for Planning and the Management of Change." The U.S. Environmental Protection Agency (EPA) defines smart growth as “a range of development and conservation strategies that help protect our health and natural environment and make our communities more attractive, economically stronger, and more socially diverse." Smart growth agenda is comprehensive and ambitious, however, its implementation is problematic as control of outward movement means limiting availability of single-family homes and reliance on the automobile, the mainstay of the traditional American lifestyle.

Smart growth is related to, or may be used in combination with, the following concepts:

- New Urbanism
- Growth management
- New community design
- Sustainable development
- Resource stewardship
- Land preservation
- Preventing urban sprawl
- Creating sense of place
- Development Best Practices
- Preservation development
- Sustainable transport
- Triple Bottom Line (TBL) accounting - people, planet, profit
- The Three Pillars - human, natural, and created capital

The smart growth approach to development is multifaceted and can encompass a variety of techniques. For example, in the state of Massachusetts smart growth is enacted by a combination of techniques including increasing housing density along transit nodes, conserving farm land, and mixing residential and commercial use areas. Perhaps the most descriptive term to characterize this concept is Traditional Neighborhood Development, which recognizes that smart growth and related concepts are not necessarily new, but are a response to car culture and sprawl. Many favor the term New Urbanism, which invokes a new, but traditional way of looking at urban planning.

There are a range of best practices associated with smart growth. These include supporting existing communities, redeveloping underutilized sites, enhancing economic competitiveness, providing more transportation choices, developing livability measures and tools, promoting equitable and affordable housing, providing a vision for sustainable growth, enhancing integrated planning and investment, aligning, coordinating, and leveraging government policies, redefining housing affordability and making the development process transparent.

Related, but somewhat different, are the overarching goals of smart growth, and they include: making the community more competitive for new businesses, providing alternative places to shop, work, and play, creating a better "Sense of Place," providing jobs for residents, increasing property values, improving quality of life, expanding the tax base, preserving open space, controlling growth, and improving safety.

== Basic principles ==
There are 10 accepted principles that define smart growth:

1. Mix land uses.
2. Take advantage of compact building design.
3. Create a range of housing opportunities and choices.
4. Create walkable neighborhoods.
5. Foster distinctive, attractive communities with a strong sense of place.
6. Preserve open space, farmland, natural beauty, and critical environmental areas.
7. Strengthen and direct development towards existing communities.
8. Provide a variety of transportation choices.
9. Make development decisions predictable, fair, and cost effective.
10. Encourage community and stakeholder collaboration in development decisions.

== History ==
Transportation and community planners began to promote the idea of compact cities and communities and adopt many of the regulatory approaches associated with smart growth in the early 1970s. The cost and difficulty of acquiring land (particularly in historic and/or areas designated as conservancies) to build and widen highways caused some politicians to reconsider basing transportation planning on motor vehicles.

The Congress for the New Urbanism, with architect Peter Calthorpe, promoted and popularized the idea of urban villages that relied on public transportation, bicycling, and walking instead of automobile use. Architect Andrés Duany promoted changing design codes to promote a sense of community, and to discourage driving. Colin Buchanan and Stephen Plowden helped to lead the debate in the United Kingdom.

The Local Government Commission which presents the annual New Partners for Smart Growth conference adopted the original Ahwahnee Principles in 1991 which articulates many of the major principles now generally accepted as part of the smart growth movement such as transit oriented development, a focus on walking distance, greenbelts and wildlife corridors, and infill and redevelopment. The document was co-authored by several of the founders of the New Urbanist movement. The Local Government Commission has been co-sponsoring smart growth-related conferences since 1997. The New Partners for Smart Growth Conference started under that name circa 2002.

Smart Growth America, an organization devoted to promoting smart growth in the United States, was founded in 2002. This organization leads an evolving coalition of national and regional organizations most of which predated its founding such as 1000 Friends of Oregon, founded in 1975, and the Congress for the New Urbanism, founded in 1993. The EPA launched its smart growth program in 1995.

== Rationale for smart growth ==
Smart growth is an alternative to urban sprawl, traffic congestion, disconnected neighborhoods, and urban decay. Its principles challenge old assumptions in urban planning, such as the value of detached houses and automobile use.

=== Environmental protection ===
Environmentalists promote smart growth by advocating urban-growth boundaries, or Green belts, as they have been termed in England since the 1930s.

=== Public health ===
Transit-oriented development can improve the quality of life and encourage a healthier, pedestrian-based lifestyle with less pollution. EPA suggests that smart growth can help reduce air pollution, improve water quality, and reduce greenhouse gas emissions.

=== Reaction to existing subsidies ===
Smart growth advocates claim that much of the urban sprawl of the 20th century was due to government subsidies for infrastructure that redistribute the true costs of sprawl. Examples include subsidies for highway building, fossil fuels, and electricity.

==== Electrical subsidies ====
With electricity, there is a cost associated with extending and maintaining the service delivery system, as with water and sewage, but there also is a loss in the commodity being delivered. The farther from the generator, the more power is lost in distribution. According to the Department of Energy's (DOE) Energy Information Administration (EIA), 9 percent of energy is lost in transmission. Current average cost pricing, where customers pay the same price per unit of power regardless of the true cost of their service, subsidizes sprawl development. With electricity deregulation, some states now charge customers/developers fees for extending distribution to new locations rather than rolling such costs into utility rates.

New Jersey, for example, has implemented a plan that divides the state into five planning areas, some of which are designated for growth, while others are protected. The state is developing a series of incentives to coax local governments into changing zoning laws that will be compatible with the state plan. The New Jersey Board of Public Utilities recently proposed a revised rule that presents a tiered approach to utility financing. In areas not designated for growth, utilities and their ratepayers are forbidden to cover the costs of extending utility lines to new developments—and developers will be required to pay the full cost of public utility infrastructure. In designated growth areas that have local smart plans endorsed by the State Planning Commission, developers will be refunded the cost of extending utility lines to new developments at two times the rate of the revenue received by developers in smart growth areas that do not have approved plans.

== Elements ==
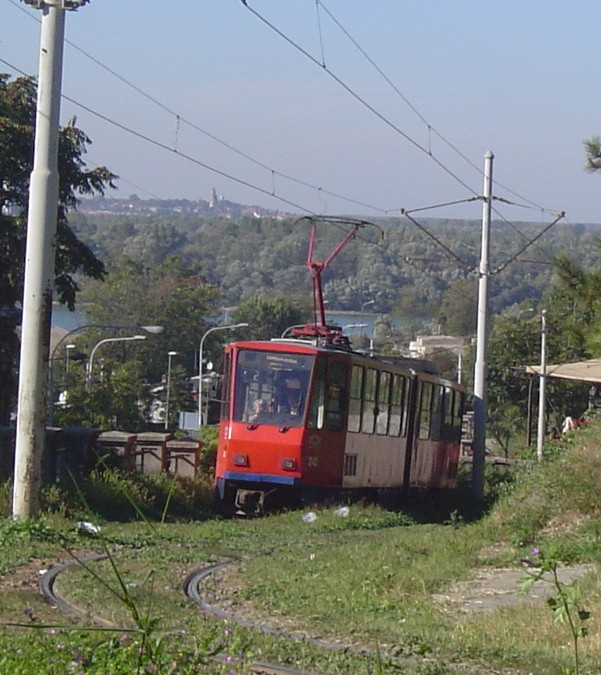
Green tramway track in Belgrade, Serbia

Growth is "smart growth", to the extent that it includes the elements listed below.

=== Compact neighborhoods ===
Compact, livable urban neighborhoods attract more people and business. Creating such neighborhoods is a critical element of reducing urban sprawl and protecting the climate. Such a tactic includes adopting redevelopment strategies and zoning policies that channel housing and job growth into urban centers and neighborhood business districts, to create compact, walkable, and bike- and transit-friendly hubs. This sometimes requires local governmental bodies to implement code changes that allow increased height and density downtown and regulations that not only eliminate minimum parking requirements for new development but establish a maximum number of allowed spaces. Other topics fall under this concept:

- mixed-use development
- inclusion of affordable housing
- restrictions or limitations on suburban design forms (e.g., detached houses on individual lots, strip malls and surface parking lots)
- inclusion of parks and recreation areas

In sustainable architecture the recent movements of New Urbanism and New Classical Architecture promote a sustainable approach towards construction, that appreciates and develops smart growth, architectural tradition and classical design. This in contrast to modernist and globally uniform architecture, as well as leaning against solitary housing estates and suburban sprawl. Both trends started in the 1980s.

=== Transit-oriented development ===
Transit-oriented development (TOD) is a residential or commercial area designed to maximize access to public transport, and mixed-use/compact neighborhoods tend to use transit at all times of the day. Many cities striving to implement better TOD strategies seek to secure funding to create new public transportation infrastructure and improve existing services. Other measures might include regional cooperation to increase efficiency and expand services, and moving buses and trains more frequently through high-use areas. Other topics fall under this concept:

- Transportation demand management measures
- road pricing system (tolling)
- commercial parking taxes

=== Pedestrian- and bicycle-friendly design ===
Biking and walking instead of driving can reduce emissions, save money on fuel and maintenance, and foster a healthier population. Pedestrian- and bicycle-friendly improvements include bike lanes on main streets, an urban bike-trail system, bike parking, pedestrian crossings, and associated master plans. The most pedestrian- and bike-friendly variant of smart growth and New Urbanism is New Pedestrianism) because motor vehicles are on a separate grid.

=== Others ===
- preserving open space and critical habitat, reusing land, and protecting water supplies and air quality
- transparent, predictable, fair and cost-effective rules for development
- historic preservation
- Setting aside large areas where development is prohibited, nature is able to run its course, providing fresh air and clean water.
- Expansion around already existing areas allows public services to be located where people are living without taking away from the core city neighborhoods in large urban areas.
- Developing around preexisting areas decreases the socioeconomic segregation allowing society to function more equitably, generating a tax base for housing, educational and employment programs.

== Policy tools ==
=== Zoning ordinances ===
The most widely used tool for achieving smart growth is modification of local zoning laws. Zoning laws are applicable to most cities and counties in the United States. Smart growth advocates often seek to modify zoning ordinances to increase the density of development and redevelopment allowed in or near existing towns and neighborhoods and/or restrict new development in outlying or environmentally sensitive areas. Additional density incentives can be offered for development of brownfield and greyfield land or for providing amenities such as parks and open space. Zoning ordinances typically include minimum parking requirements. Reductions in or elimination of parking minimums or imposition of parking maximums can also reduce the amount of parking built with new development increasing land available for parks and other community amenities.

=== Urban growth boundaries ===
Related to zoning ordinances, an urban growth boundary (UGB) is a tool used in some U.S. cities to contain high density development to certain areas. The first urban growth boundary in the United States was established in 1958 in Kentucky. Subsequently, urban growth boundaries were established in Oregon in the 1970s and Florida in the 1980s. Some believe that UGBs contributed to the escalation of housing prices from 2000 to 2006, as they limited the supply of developable land. However, this is not completely substantiated because prices continued to rise even after municipalities expanded their growth boundaries.

=== Transfer of development rights ===
Transfer of development rights (TDR) systems are intended to allow property owners in areas deemed desirable for growth (such as infill and brownfield sites) to purchase the right to build at higher densities from owners of properties in areas deemed undesirable for growth such as environmental lands, farmlands or lands outside of an urban growth boundary. TDR programs have been implemented in over 200 U.S. communities.

=== Provision of social infrastructure ===
Systematic provision of infrastructure such as schools, libraries, sporting facilities and community facilities is an integral component of smart growth communities. This is commonly known as 'social infrastructure' or 'community infrastructure'. In Australia, for example, most new suburban developments are master planned, and key social infrastructure is planned at the outset.

=== Environmental impact assessments ===
One popular approach to assist in smart growth in democratic countries is for lawmakers to require prospective developers to prepare environmental impact assessments of their plans as a condition for state and/or local governments to give them permission to build their buildings. These reports often indicate how significant impacts generated by the development will be mitigated, the cost of which is usually paid by the developer. These assessments are frequently controversial. Conservationists, neighborhood advocacy groups and NIMBYs are often skeptical about such impact reports, even when they are prepared by independent agencies and subsequently approved by the decision makers rather than the promoters. Conversely, developers will sometimes strongly resist being required to implement the mitigation measures required by the local government as they may be quite costly.

In communities practicing these smart growth policies, developers comply with local codes and requirements. Consequently, developer compliance builds communal trust because it demonstrates a genuine interest in the environmental quality of the community.

== Communities implementing smart growth ==
EPA presented awards for smart growth achievement between 2002 and 2015. The awardees comprised 64 projects in 28 states. Among the localities receiving awards were:

- Arlington County, Virginia
- Minneapolis and Saint Paul, Minnesota
- Davidson, North Carolina
- Denver, Colorado.

The smart growth network has recognized these U.S. communities for implementing smart growth principles:

- The Kentlands; Gaithersburg, Maryland (for live-work units)
- East Liberty; Pittsburgh, Pennsylvania (establishing downtown retail)
- Moore Square Museums Magnet Middle School; Raleigh, North Carolina (for being located downtown)
- Garfield Park; Chicago, Illinois(retaining transit options)
- Murphy Park; St. Louis, Missouri (bringing the features of suburban living to the city)
- New Jersey Pine Barrens, South Jersey (for transfer of development rights away from undeveloped land)
- Chesterfield Township, New Jersey (for township wide transfer of development rights away from forest and farmland and development of the several hundred acre New Urbanism community of Old York Village.

The European Union has recognized these cities and regions for implementing "smart specialization" which originated from smart growth principles:

- Navarre, Spain (Improving education and developing projects for medical tourism and green vehicles)
- Flanders, Belgium (Spending funds on transportation, healthcare services, and technological innovation)
- Lower Austria ( Cooperating with neighboring regions to develop new markets for local companies)

In May 2011, The European Union released a Regional Policy report for smart growth policy for 2020. The Regional Policy report stated smart specialization was the strategy to focus Europe's resources and administer smart growth principles.

In July 2011, The Atlantic magazine called the BeltLine, a series of housing, trail, and transit projects along a 22-mile (35-km) long disused rail corridor surrounding the core of Atlanta, the United States' "most ambitious smart growth project".

In Savannah, Georgia (US) the historic Oglethorpe Plan has been shown to contain most of the elements of smart growth in its network of wards, each of which has a central civic square. The plan has demonstrated its resilience to changing conditions, and the city is using the plan as a model for growth in newer areas.

In Melbourne, Australia, almost all new outer-suburban developments are master planned, guided by the principles of smart growth.

== Smart growth, urban sprawl and automobile dependency ==
Whether smart growth (or the "compact City") does or does not reduce problems of automobile dependency associated with urban sprawl has been fiercely argued over several decades. A 2007 meta-study by Keith Barthomomew of the University of Utah found that reductions in driving associated with compact development scenarios averaged 8 percent, ranging up to 31.7 percent, with the variation being explained by the degree of land use mixing and density. An influential study in 1989 by Peter Newman and Jeff Kenworthy compared 32 cities across North America, Australia, Europe and Asia. The study has been criticised for its methodology but the main finding that denser cities, particularly in Asia, have lower car use than sprawling cities, particularly in North America, has been largely accepted — although the relationship is clearer at the extremes across continents than it is within countries where conditions are more similar.

Within cities, studies from across many countries (mainly in the developed world) have shown that denser urban areas with greater mixture of land use and better public transport tend to have lower car use than less dense suburban and ex-urban residential areas. This usually holds true even after controlling for socio-economic factors such as differences in household composition and income. This does not necessarily imply that suburban sprawl causes high car use, however. One confounding factor, which has been the subject of many studies, is residential self-selection: people who prefer to drive tend to move towards low density suburbs, whereas people who prefer to walk, cycle or use transit tend to move towards higher density urban areas, better served by public transport. Some studies have found that, when self-selection is controlled for, the built environment has no significant effect on travel behaviour. More recent studies using more sophisticated methodologies have generally refuted these findings: density, land use and public transport accessibility can influence travel behaviour, although social and economic factors, particularly household income, usually exert a stronger influence.

=== Paradox of intensification ===
Reviewing the evidence on urban intensification, smart growth and their effects on travel behaviour Melia et al. (2011) found support for the arguments of both supporters and opponents of smart growth. Planning policies which increase population densities in urban areas do tend to reduce car use, but the effect is a weak one, so doubling the population density of a particular area will not halve the frequency or distance of car use.

For example, Portland, Oregon, a U.S. city which has pursued smart growth policies, substantially increased its population density between 1990 and 2000 when other US cities of a similar size were reducing in density. As predicted by the paradox, traffic volumes and congestion both increased more rapidly than in the other cities, despite a substantial increase in transit use.

These findings led them to propose the paradox of intensification, which states "Ceteris paribus, urban intensification which increases population density will reduce per capita car use, with benefits to the global environment, but will also increase concentrations of motor traffic, worsening the local environment in those locations where it occurs".

Through a range of positive measures at the citywide level, it may be possible to counteract the increases in traffic and congestion which would otherwise result from increasing population densities: Freiburg im Breisgau in Germany is one example of a city which has been more successful in this respect.

This study also reviewed evidence on the local effects of building at higher densities. At the level of the neighbourhood or individual development positive measures (e.g. improvements to public transport) will usually be insufficient to counteract the traffic effect of increasing population density. This leaves policy-makers with four choices: intensify and accept the local consequences, sprawl and accept the wider consequences, a compromise with some element of both, or intensify accompanied by more radical measures such as parking restrictions, closing roads to traffic and carfree zones.

In contrast, the city of Cambridge, Massachusetts reported that its Kendall Square neighborhood saw a 40% increase in commercial space attended by a traffic decrease of 14%.

A report by CEOs for Cities, "Driven Apart," showed that while denser cities in the United States may have more congested commutes they are also shorter on average in both time and distance. This is in contrast to cities where commuters face less congestion but drive longer distances resulting in commutes that take as long or longer.

=== Proponents ===
- Edward L. Glaeser
- Rollin Stanley

== Criticism ==
Robert Bruegmann, professor of art history, architecture, and urban planning at the University of Illinois at Chicago and author of Sprawl: A Compact History, stated that historical attempts to combat urban sprawl have failed, and that the high population density of Los Angeles, currently the most dense urban area in the United States, "lies at the root of many of the woes experienced by L.A. today."

Wendell Cox is a vocal opponent of smart growth policies. He argued before the United States Senate Committee on Environment and Public Works that, "smart growth strategies tend to intensify the very problems they are purported to solve." Cox and Joshua Utt analyzed smart growth and sprawl, and argued that:

Our analysis indicates that the Current Urban Planning Assumptions are of virtually no value in predicting local government expenditures per capita. The lowest local government expenditures per capita are not in the higher density, slower growing, and older municipalities.

On the contrary, the actual data indicate that the lowest expenditures per capita tend to be in medium- and lower-density municipalities (though not the lowest density); medium- and faster-growing municipalities; and newer municipalities. This is after 50 years of unprecedented urban decentralization, which seems to be more than enough time to have developed the purported urban sprawl-related higher local government expenditures. It seems unlikely that the higher expenditures that did not develop due to sprawl in the last 50 years will evolve in the next 20 - despite predictions to the contrary in The Costs of Sprawl 2000 research.

It seems much more likely that the differences in municipal expenditures per capita are the result of political, rather than economic factors, especially the influence of special interests.

The phrase "smart growth" implies that other growth and development theories are not "smart". There is debate about whether transit-proximate development constitutes smart growth when it is not transit-oriented. The National Motorists Association does not object to smart growth as a whole, but strongly objects to traffic calming, which is intended to reduce automobile accidents and fatalities, but may also reduce automobile usage and increase alternate forms of public transportation.

In 2002 the National Center for Public Policy Research, a self-described conservative think tank, published an economic study entitled "Smart Growth and Its Effects on Housing Markets: The New Segregation" which termed smart growth "restricted growth" and suggested that smart growth policies disfavor minorities and the poor by driving up housing prices.

Some libertarian groups, such as the Cato Institute, criticize smart growth on the grounds that it leads to greatly increased land values, and people with average incomes can no longer afford to buy detached houses.

A number of ecological economists claim that industrial civilization has already "overshot" the carrying capacity of the Earth, and "smart growth" is mostly an illusion. Instead, a steady state economy would be needed to bring human societies back into a necessary balance with the ability of the ecosystem to sustain humans (and other species).

A study released in November 2009 characterized the smart-growth policies in the U.S. state of Maryland as a failure, concluding that "[t]here is no evidence after ten years that [smart-growth laws] have had any effect on development patterns." Factors include a lack of incentives for builders to redevelop older neighborhoods and limits on the ability of state planners to force local jurisdictions to approve high-density developments in "smart-growth" areas. Buyers demand low-density development and voters tend to oppose high density developments near them.

Beginning in 2010, groups generally associated with the Tea Party movement began to identify Smart Growth as an outgrowth of the United Nations Agenda 21 which they viewed as an attempt by international interests to force a "sustainable" lifestyle on the United States. However planning groups and even some smart growth opponents counter that Smart Growth concepts and groups predate the 1992 Agenda 21 conference. In addition the word "sustainable development" as used in the Agenda 21 report is often misread to mean real estate development when it typically refers to the much broader concept of human development in the United Nations and foreign aid context which addresses a broader slate of economic, health, poverty, and education issues.

== See also ==
Related topics

- New Urbanism
- Community Preservation Act
- Garden city movement
- Planned community
- Principles of Intelligent Urbanism
- Slow architecture
- Sustainable city
- Sustainable Development Goal 11 – 11th of 17 Sustainable Development Goals for sustainable cities
- Traditional Neighborhood Development (TND)
- Urban renewal
- Urban vitality
- Agenda 21
- Soft law
- Sustainable development

Organizations

- Futurewise.org
- Smart Growth America
- Greenbelt Alliance
- HUD USER
- Regulatory Barriers Clearinghouse
- PolicyLink
