= Uniform Physical Condition Standards =

Uniform Physical Condition Standards (UPCS) is the name used to refer to a set of standards used by inspectors working for the United States Department of Housing and Urban Development (HUD) and the Real Estate Assessment Center (REAC) to assess the physical condition of public housing units and housing units which are insured by or assisted under various programs of HUD. HUD originally proposed these standards in the Federal Register on September 1, 1998 and followed up with publications at later dates further explaining and clarifying these standards and requirements. These standards were also adopted by the Internal Revenue Service (IRS) on January 1, 2001, for monitoring the physical condition of units in the Low Income Housing Tax Credit program. UPCS organizes properties for evaluation based on five inspectable areas: Site, Building Exterior, Building Systems, Common Areas, and Unit. Each of these five inspectable areas are further broken down to specific Inspectable Items and Observable Deficiencies.

== See also ==
- Title 12 of the Code of Federal Regulations
- Federal Housing Finance Agency
- HUD USER
- Office of Fair Housing and Equal Opportunity
- Mortgage Discrimination
- Regulatory Barriers Clearinghouse
