= Low-Income Housing Tax Credit =

US federal incentive for private affordable home development

The Low-Income Housing Tax Credit (LIHTC) is a federal program in the United States that awards tax credits to housing developers in exchange for agreeing to reserve a certain fraction of units as rent-restricted for lower-income households. The housing developers can then sell the tax credits for cash to fund the cost of development. The program was created under the Tax Reform Act of 1986 (TRA86) to incentivize the use of private equity in developing affordable housing. Projects developed with LIHTC credits must maintain a certain percentage of affordable units for a set period of time, typically 30 years, though there is a "qualified contract" process that can allow property owners to opt out after 15 years. The maximum rent that can be charged for designated affordable units is based on Area Median Income (AMI); over 51% of residents in LIHTC properties are considered Extremely Low-Income (at or below 30% AMI). Less than 10% of current credit expenditures are claimed by individual investors.

From 1987 to 2024, at least 3.9 million housing units were placed in service through the LIHTC program. As of 2012, the LIHTC program accounted for approximately 90% of all newly created affordable rental housing in the United States. A 2018 report by the GAO covering the years 2011-2015 found that the LIHTC program financed about 50,000 low-income rental units annually, with median costs per unit for new construction ranging from $126,000 in Texas to $326,000 in California.

In 2010, the President's Economic Recovery Advisory Board (PERAB) estimated that the LIHTC program would cost the federal government $61 billion (an average of about $6 billion per year) in lost tax revenue from participating corporations from 2008-2017, as well as noting that some experts believe that vouchers would more cost-effectively help low income households. In 2023, the LIHTC program is estimated to cost the government an average of $13.5 billion annually.Starting in 2026, the One Big Beautiful Bill Act increased the states annual allocation authority by 12% and lowered the tax-exempt bond financing requirement from 50% to 25%.

== How it works ==
=== Application process ===
The first step in the process is for a project owner to submit an application to a state authority, which will consider the application competitively. The application will include estimates of the expected cost of the project and a commitment to comply with one of the following conditions, known as "set-asides":

- At least 20% or more of the residential units in the development are both rent restricted and occupied by individuals whose income is 50% or less than the area median gross income ("20/50").
- At least 40% or more of the residential units in the development are both rent restricted and occupied by individuals whose income is 60% or less than the area median gross income ("40/60").
- At least 40% or more of the residential units in the development are both rent restricted and occupied by individuals whose income does not exceed the imputed income limitation designated by the taxpayer with respect to the respective unit. The average of the imputed income limitations shall not exceed 60% of the area median gross income ("income averaging").

Typically, the project owner will agree to a higher percentage of low income usage than these minimums, up to 100%. Low-income tenants can be charged a maximum rent of 30% of the maximum eligible income, which is 60% of the area's median income adjusted for household size as determined by HUD. There are no limits on the rents that can be charged to tenants who are not low income but live in the same project.

Two variants of the credit are available to developers, distinguished by their intended subsidy level. The 9% credit is generally reserved for new construction and substantial rehabilitation projects not financed with certain additional federal subsidies, and was originally designed to deliver a subsidy equal to 70% of a project's qualified basis in present-value terms. The 4% credit is typically used for acquisition costs and for projects financed with tax-exempt private activity bonds, and was originally designed to deliver a 30% present-value subsidy.

The 9% credit is commonly called the competitive credit because awards are drawn from each state's annual allocation authority and developers must compete for them through state housing finance agencies. The 4% credit is commonly called the non-competitive or automatic credit because it is awarded automatically to bond-financed projects meeting a financing threshold, and is not drawn from the state's 9% allocation ceiling.

Each state receives an annual allocation of 9% credit authority based on its population. The per-capita multiplier was originally set at $1.25 in 1986, raised in stages to $1.75 by 2003, and has been adjusted for inflation annually thereafter. For 2025 the multiplier reached $3.00 for the first time, with a small-state minimum allocation of $3,455,000; states receive the greater of the two amounts.[2][3] The national 9% LIHTC allocation ceiling for 2025 was approximately $1.1 billion.

A temporary 12.5% increase in per-capita allocation authority was in effect from 2018 through 2021 under the Consolidated Appropriations Act of 2018, after which it expired. The One Big Beautiful Bill Act of 2025 (P.L. 119-21) enacted a permanent 12% increase in the 9% per-capita allocation beginning in 2026.

== 2008 Financial Crisis Impact on LIHTC ==
First, Title XII of the Recovery Act appropriated $2.25 billion to the HOME Investment Partnerships (HOME) Program—administered by the U.S. Department of Housing and Urban Development (HUD)—for a grant program to provide funds for capital investments in LIHTC projects. HUD awarded Tax Credit Assistance Program (TCAP) grants to state housing credit agencies to facilitate development of projects that received LIHTC awards between October 1, 2006, and September 30, 2009. The State housing agencies were allowed to offer the assistance in either a grant or loan form to the properties.

Second, Section 1602 of the Recovery Act allowed State housing agencies to elect to receive cash grants instead of the tax credits for up to 40% of the State’s LIHTC allocation. The Department of Treasury estimated outlay to States was $3 billion for 2009. State housing agencies were required to use a grant to make sub-awards to finance the acquisition or construction of qualified low-income buildings, generally subject to the LIHTC requirements discussed (including rent, income, and use restrictions on such buildings). The Section 1602 program was applicable to LIHTC awards made between October 1, 2006, and September 30, 2009. Recent Congressional legislation proposed expanding this program to 2010 housing credits (see below).

In the latter part of 2010, the market stabilized as non-traditional investors began to back fill the investment gap. LIHTC advocates rallied around legislative proposals to ensure that investment remained stable in both the short-term and in the future. Harvard University's Joint Center for Housing Studies and the Massachusetts Institute of Technology's Center for Real Estate have identified potential opportunities on which to improve the LIHTC to make it more efficient.

== Evaluations and Studies ==
In 2010, the President's Economic Recovery Advisory Board (PERAB) estimated that the LIHTC program would cost the federal government $61 billion (an average of about $6 billion per year) in lost tax revenue from participating corporations from 2008-2017, as well as noting that experts believe that vouchers would more cost-effectively help low income households.

A 2018 report by the GAO covering the years 2011-2015 found that the LIHTC program financed about 50,000 low-income rental units annually, with median costs per unit for new construction ranging from $126,000 in Texas to $326,000 in California. Some other notable findings were that:

- the range of per-unit costs varied dramatically, with Georgia having the lowest variance ($104,000) between the least expensive per-unit cost and the most expensive per-unit cost, while California had the highest variance of $606,000. (Meaning that the per-unit cost in California varied from about $140,000 to about $750,000.)
- larger projects (>100 units) were about $85,000 less expensive per-unit than smaller (<37 units) projects
- urban projects cost about $13,000 more per-unit than non-urban projects
- projects for senior tenants (about a third of all projects) cost about $7,000 less per unit (possibly because of smaller unit sizes

A 2022 study found that LIHTC projects increase land value in surrounding neighborhoods.

A 2018 Urban Institute report criticized the program's lack of permanent affordability requirements and questioned whether it fully meets the needs of the poorest households.

== See also ==
- United States Department of Housing and Urban Development
- United States Department of Treasury
- Internal Revenue Service
- Internal Revenue Code
- Category:Housing finance agencies of the United States
- Tax Reform Act of 1986
- HUD USER
- Regulatory Barriers Clearinghouse
