= Public housing in Puerto Rico =

Public housing in Puerto Rico is a subsidized system of housing units, mostly consisting of housing projects (residenciales, barriadas, or caseríos públicos), which are provided for low-income families in Puerto Rico. The system is mainly financed with programs from the US Department of Housing and Urban Development (HUD) and the US Department of Agriculture USDA Rural Development. As of 2020, there were 325 public housing developments in Puerto Rico.

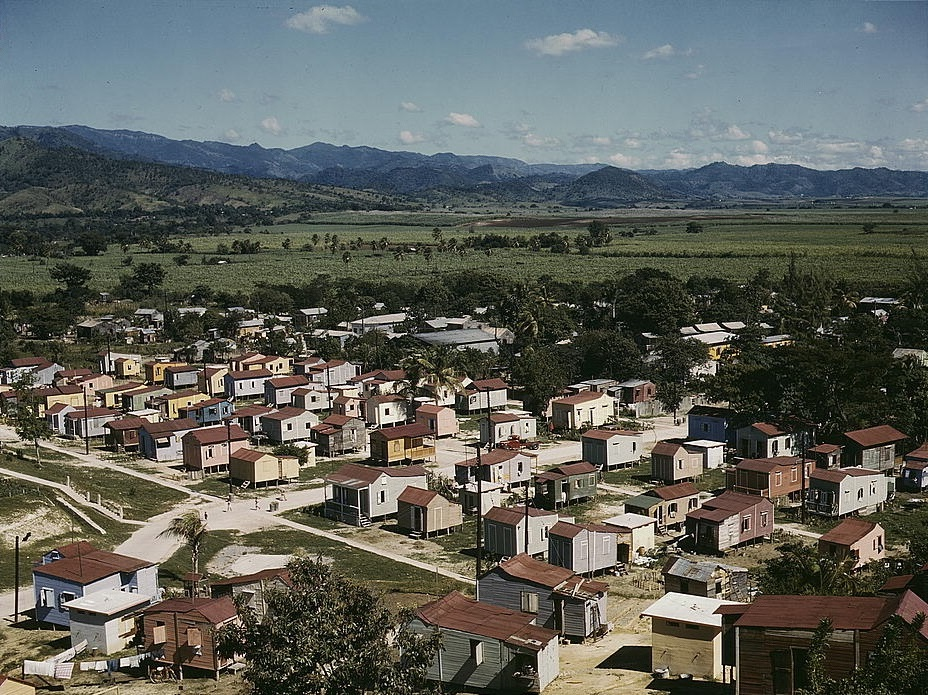
Public housing project in Ponce, Puerto Rico in 1941

== Introduction ==
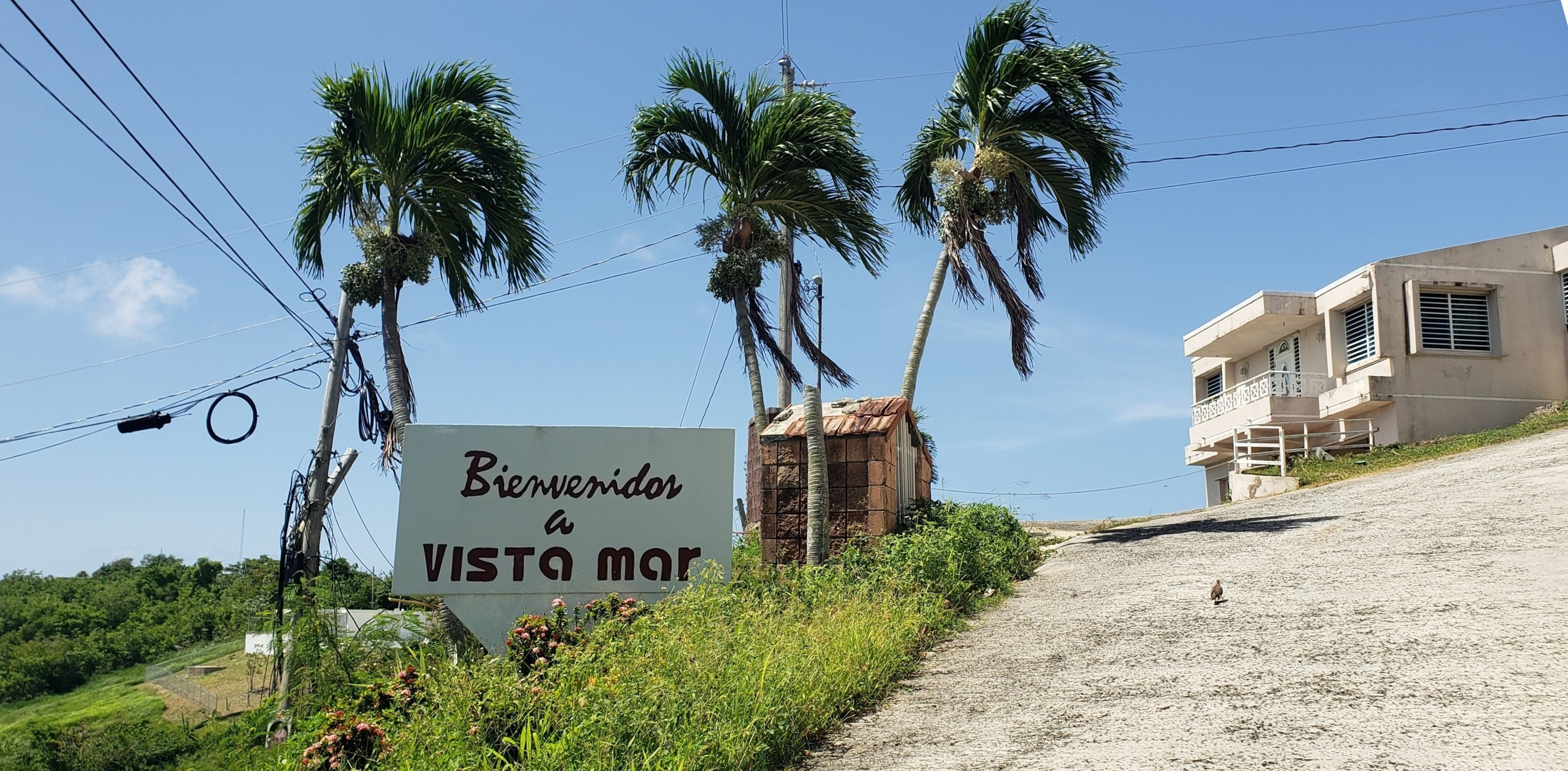
Urbanización Vista Mar in Playa barrio in Yabucoa

Neighborhoods in Puerto Rico are often divided into three types: sector, urbanización, and residencial público (public housing).

An urbanización is a type of housing where land is developed into lots, often by a private developer, and where single-family homes are built. Non single-family units, such as condominiums and townhouses fall into this category.

Public housing, on the other hand, are housing units built with government funding. These have traditionally consisted of multi-family dwellings in housing complexes: in a barriada (neighborhood) or in a caserío público also called a residencial (public housing). This is housing where all exterior grounds are shared areas. Increasingly, public housing developments that look like garden apartments are being built.

Finally, a home that is located in neither an urbanización nor of a public housing development is said to be located in a barrio.

In Puerto Rico, a barrio also has a second and official meaning- the geographical area into which a municipality of Puerto Rico is divided for administrative purposes. In this sense, urbanizaciones, public housing developments, as well as one or several "barrios" in the popular sense of the word (as in sector, from a populated place standpoint), may be located in one of the 902 official geographic areas which are seen on the Puerto Rico US Census records.

== History ==
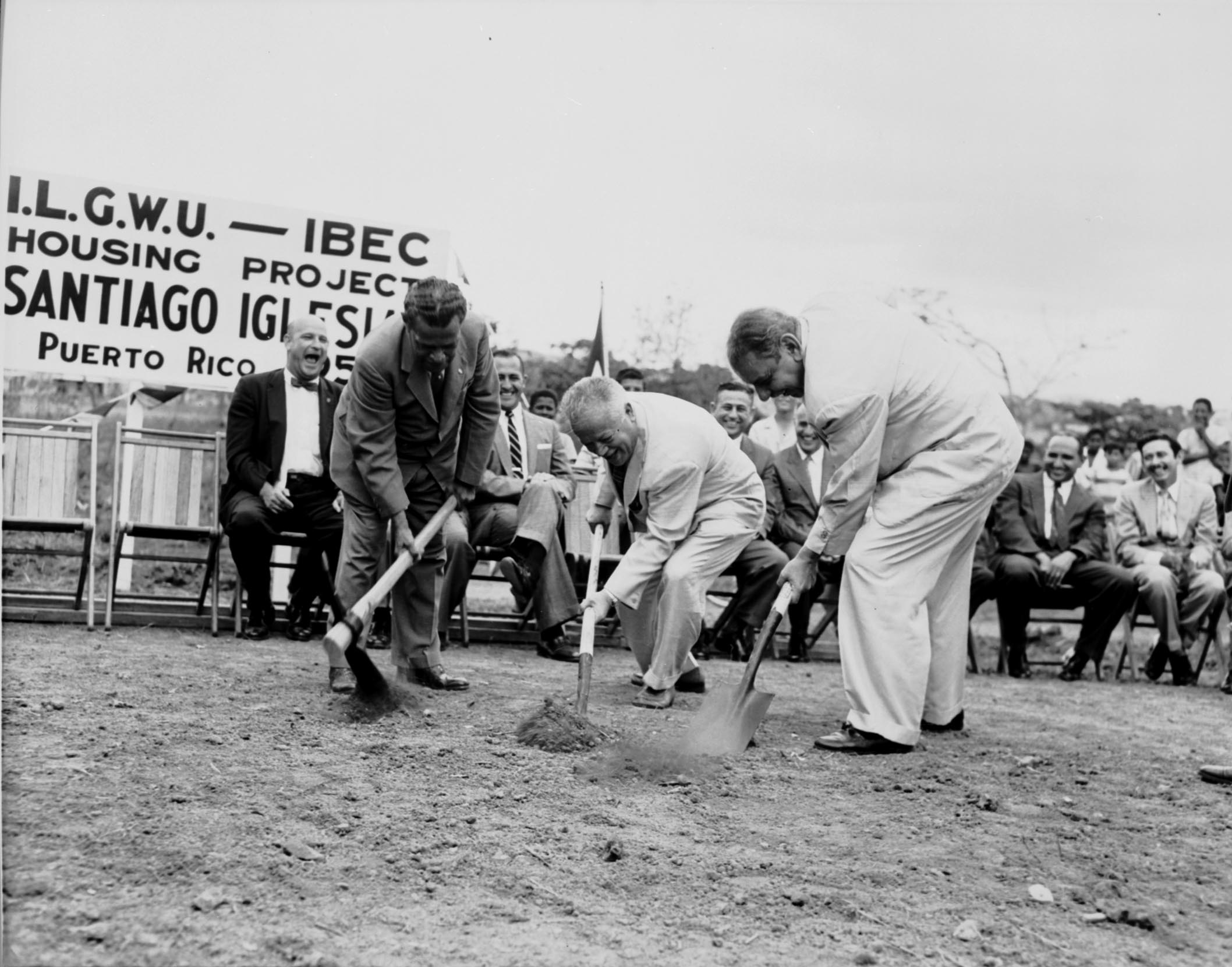
David Dubinsky, Governor Muñoz Marín, and an unidentified man break ground for the ILGWU - IBEC Santiago Iglesias housing project in Puerto Rico, 1957

By the early 1940s La Autoridad Sobre Solares was addressing the issue of subpar housing in Puerto Rico. A law passed in Puerto Rico in 1945 allowed housing agencies to clear slum areas (arrabales). One of the provisions of the US Housing Act of 1949 did the same. As a result of the 1949 law, agencies in Puerto Rico sent plans for the construction of caseríos (housing) to Washington, DC for approval and by August 1952, the building of 9,890 new units across Puerto Rico had been authorized.

Law 93-383 passed by the US Congress on August 22, 1974, for the improvement of residences, included Puerto Rico.

The Puerto Rico Department of Housing, created in 1972, succeeded the Urban Renewal and Housing Corporation, or Corporación de Renovación Urbana y Vivienda (CRUV, its Spanish acronym), which was created in the late 1950s to succeed the Puerto Rico Housing Authority, created by Gov. Luis Muñoz Marín and headed by Juan César Cordero Dávila, to consolidate several state and municipal housing agencies.

Puerto Rico Housing and CRUV were responsible for the design and construction of many of the older "residenciales" in Puerto Rico.

The first three public housing developments, Ponce De Leon, Santiago Iglesias and Caribe, are located in the city of Ponce. Henry Klumb provided early support for those efforts and one of his protégés, George McClintock was the first Architect-in-Chief of Puerto Rico Housing in the early-to-mid 1950s.

Klumb's designs are the 1945 design work for the Cataño, San Lorenzo, Lares and Aguadilla Puerto Rico Housing projects, Naranjito Public Housing Project in 1957, Comerío Public Housing Project in 1958, and Residencial Las Virtudes, designed and built between 1969 ad 1976. Klumb had previously done work for several municipal housing agencies, including Mayagüez' and Ponce's.

In 1973, José Enrique Arrarás became the first Secretary of Housing. He was appointed by Gov. Rafael Hernández Colón.

In 1993, then governor Pedro Rosselló had the Puerto Rico National Guard doing security work at some of the public housing areas where crime, related to drug trafficking, was most prevalent.

Since their construction, there have been many occasions when families are evicted en masse, and the buildings are demolished to make space for the erection of some new type of housing, that doesn't resemble "public housing".

== Organization ==
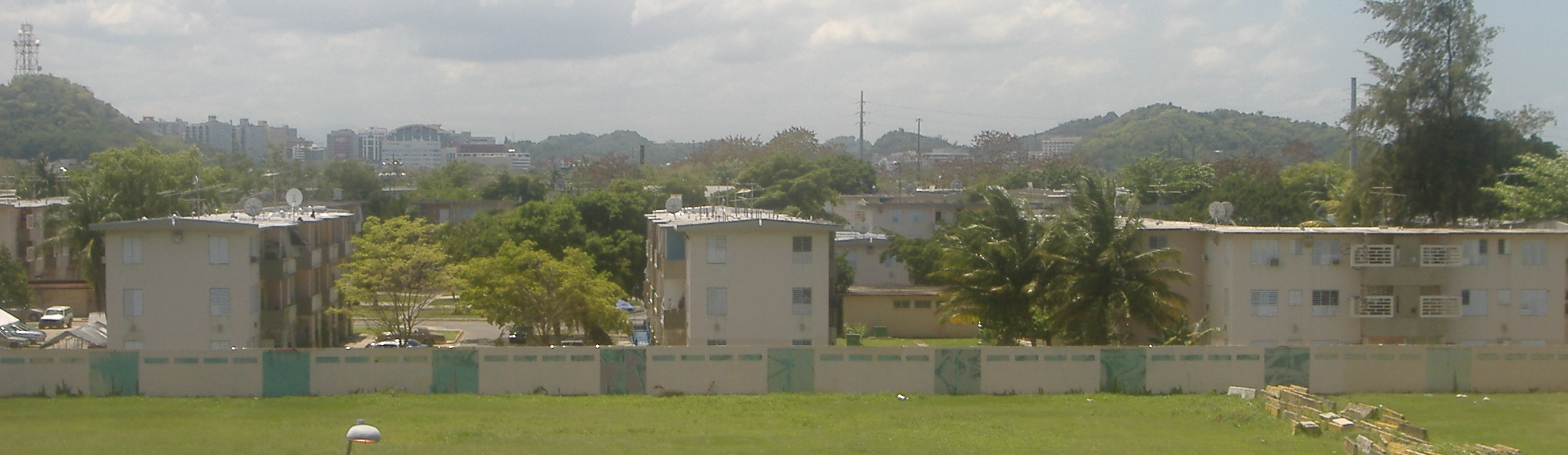
Rear view of a public housing project, near Plaza Las Americas

As of 2020, there were 325 public housing developments in Puerto Rico under the Puerto Rico Public Housing Authority (PRPHA) and being managed by Management Agents. Operating funds are provided by HUD for tenant rent subsidizing and for the construction, acquisition, maintenance, and operations of public housing projects, which are in turn administered by several entities throughout the island called Public Housing Agencies (PHAs).

The main Public Housing Agency in Puerto Rico is the Public Housing Administration (Administración de Vivienda Pública, or AVP, in Spanish) under the Puerto Rico Department of Housing (Departamento de Vivienda in Spanish). Other Public Housing Agencies include certain municipalities which are authorized by HUD and commonwealth law to operate housing projects independent of the main state PHA. All PHAs can contract a Management Agent (usually a for-profit enterprise) to manage the day-to-day operations, including processing tenant complaints, housing unit repairs, and overall project maintenance.

HUD also allows private non-profit organizations and for-profit enterprises to manage housing projects as PHAs, offering program funding and tax incentives (Tax Credit Projects) in order to compensate for operating costs. However, these types of public housing projects are not as common in Puerto Rico as those that are managed by the state.

The PHA is responsible for providing adequate living arrangements for program tenants, in compliance with Uniform Physical Condition Standards (UPCS) (formerly Housing Quality Standards (HQS)) set by HUD. Additionally, the PHA must manage all federal funds received in an efficient and reasonable way, in compliance with HUD prescribed guidelines and with Chapter 24 of the US Code of Federal Regulations (CFR). Management Agents are also required to comply with these standards. The USDA provides federal loan programs (including direct loans or loan guarantees) to PHAs for the construction of new public housing projects or acquisition of existing living complexes to convert into public projects.

The address of a residencial is not a street name but the name of the building itself. For example, an address at Residencial Luis Llorens Torres, with more than 2000 units, would have an address such as "23 Res Llorens Torres, San Juan, Puerto Rico, 00924-1234" for apartment number 23.

=== Eligible tenants ===
The tenant rent subsidizing system allows low-income and impoverished individuals and families to reside in a subsidized housing unit just as long as their income status complies with federal regulations. Families wanting to participate must first be included on a waiting list, which includes all citizens applying for subsidized housing by order of application date. Families must therefore "wait their turn" for eligibility as the PHA selects families by that order, a process which in Puerto Rico may take several years. Applicants must provide evidence of low-income status (HUD recommends a copy of a filed income tax return) and are given a housing unit for which HUD will subsidize its rent.

== Criticism ==
Supporters of the system argue that the average annual income per person in Puerto Rico of $12,000 (2004), a figure which is much lower than in the United States, explains why a relatively larger portion of the island population participates in the system.

Criticism of public housing in Puerto Rico includes that these types of dwellings are, by nature, a breeding ground for crime.

In a small 2014 study of the female incarcerated population of Puerto Rico, they lived in either a "barrio", urbanización or public housing before their incarceration.

== List of public housing in PR ==
The following is a list Puerto Rico Public Housing Authority (PRPHA) low-rent units, managed by municipalities, and by private, non-profit and for-profit agents, with some providing a computer room with internet access and library to its residents. As of March 28, 2020, there were 325 projects (with 53828 units) and 4 protects being constructed (with 174 units) for a total of 54002 units.

PHA Code (RQ Number)	Name	Government type	Type of public housing	Total rentable units
RQ005	Puerto Rico Public Housing Authority (PRPHA)	State	Low-Rent	54002

These, approximately, 54000 units are managed by Management Agents - A & M Contract, Inc., American Management, Cost Control Company, Inc., Individual Management and Consultant, Inc., Inn-Capital Housing Division, J. A. Machuca & Assoc., M. J. Consulting & Dev., Inc., Martinal Property Corp., MAS Corporation, Mora Housing Management, Inc., and S. P. Management, Corp., as follows:

Located in Municipality	Name	Management Agents	± # of Units
Adjuntas	Alturas de Adjuntas	Individual Management and Consultant, Inc.	55
Adjuntas	Villa Valle Verde	Individual Management and Consultant, Inc.	150
Aguada	Aguada (Manuel Egipciaco)	American Management	100
Aguada	Jardines de Aguada	American Management	70
Aguada	Los Robles	American Management	62
Aguadilla	Agustín Stahl	American Management	400
Aguadilla	Bernardino Villanueva	American Management	252
Aguadilla	Cuesta Vieja	American Management	200
Aguadilla	José Agustín Aponte	American Management	300
Aguadilla	Juan García Ducos	American Management	200
Aguadilla	La Montaña	American Management	220
Aguadilla	Las Muñecas	American Management	200
Aguadilla	Puesta del Sol	American Management	100
Aguadilla	Villamar Apts.	American Management	84
Aguas Buenas	Villa Monserrate	M. J. Consulting & Dev., Inc.	104
Aguas Buenas	Vista Alegre	Cost Control Company, Inc.	74
Aibonito	Liborio Ortíz	M. J. Consulting & Dev., Inc.	160
Añasco	Francisco Figueroa	J. A. Machuca & Assoc.	160
Arecibo	Antonio Márquez Arbona	American Management	180
Arecibo	Bella Vista	American Management	150
Arecibo	Ext. Zeno Gandía	American Management	444
Arecibo	La Meseta	Cost Control Company, Inc.	300
Arecibo	Ramón Marín Solá	American Management	200
Arecibo	Trina Padilla de Sanz	Cost Control Company, Inc.	240
Arecibo	Villa de los Santos I	American Management	9
Arecibo	Villa de los Santos II	American Management	13
Arroyo	Isidro Cora	M. J. Consulting & Dev., Inc.	150
Barceloneta	Antonio Dávila Freytes	Inn-Capital Housing Division	74
Barceloneta	Plazuela Catalina	Inn-Capital Housing Division	100
Barceloneta	Quintas de Barceloneta	Inn-Capital Housing Division	46
Barranquitas	Reparto San Antonio	M. J. Consulting & Dev., Inc.	60
Barranquitas	Villa Universitaria	M. J. Consulting & Dev., Inc.	100
Bayamón	Alegría Apartments	Inn-Capital Housing Division	120
Bayamón	Bella Vista	Inn-Capital Housing Division	100
Bayamón	Brisas de Bayamón	Cost Control Company, Inc.	300
Bayamón	Campo Verde	Inn-Capital Housing Division	9
Bayamón	El Cortijo/Valencia	Inn-Capital Housing Division	3
Bayamón	Jardines de Caparra	Inn-Capital Housing Division	288
Bayamón	José Celso Barbosa	Inn-Capital Housing Division	230
Bayamón	La Alhambra	Inn-Capital Housing Division	96
Bayamón	Las Gardenias	Inn-Capital Housing Division	164
Bayamón	Los Dominicos	Inn-Capital Housing Division	100
Bayamón	Los Laureles	Inn-Capital Housing Division	100
Bayamón	Magnolia Gardens	Inn-Capital Housing Division	104
Bayamón	Rafael Torrech	Inn-Capital Housing Division	200
Bayamón	Santa Catalina	Inn-Capital Housing Division	1
Bayamón	Sierra Linda	Inn-Capital Housing Division	200
Bayamón	Virgilio Dávila	Inn-Capital Housing Division	480
Cabo Rojo	Santa Rita de Casia	J. A. Machuca & Assoc.	156
Cabo Rojo	Veredas del Mar	J. A. Machuca & Assoc.	24
Caguas	Bonneville Heights	M. J. Consulting & Dev., Inc.	100
Caguas	Brisas del Turabo I	M. J. Consulting & Dev., Inc.	178
Caguas	Brisas del Turabo II	M. J. Consulting & Dev., Inc.	122
Caguas	Caguax	M. J. Consulting & Dev., Inc.	5
Caguas	El Mirador Apartments	M. J. Consulting & Dev., Inc.	46
Caguas	Ext. La Granja	M. J. Consulting & Dev., Inc.	25
Caguas	Jardines San Carlos	M. J. Consulting & Dev., Inc.	86
Caguas	Juan Jiménez García	M. J. Consulting & Dev., Inc.	256
Caguas	Raúl Castellón	M. J. Consulting & Dev., Inc.	200
Caguas	Turabo Heights	Cost Control Company, Inc.	254
Caguas	Villa del Rey	M. J. Consulting & Dev., Inc.	100
Camuy	Manuel Adames	Municipality of Camuy	64
Canóvanas	Jesús T. Piñero	Mora Housing Management, Inc.	124
Carolina	Alturas de Country Club	Mora Housing Management, Inc.	72
Carolina	Carolina Housing	Mora Housing Management, Inc.	92
Carolina	Carolina Walk Up (El Faro)	Mora Housing Management, Inc.	100
Carolina	Catañito Gardens	Cost Control Company, Inc.	124
Carolina	El Coral	Cost Control Company, Inc.	100
Carolina	El Flamboyán	Mora Housing Management, Inc.	136
Carolina	La Esmeralda	Cost Control Company, Inc.	84
Carolina	Lagos de Blasina	Cost Control Company, Inc.	240
Carolina	Loma Alta	Mora Housing Management, Inc.	50
Carolina	Los Mirtos	Cost Control Company, Inc.	240
Carolina	Roberto Clemente	Mora Housing Management, Inc.	126
Carolina	Sabana Abajo	Mora Housing Management, Inc.	500
Carolina	Santa Catalina	Mora Housing Management, Inc.	92
Carolina	Torres de Sabana	Mora Housing Management, Inc.	452
Cataño	El Coquí	Martinal Property Corp.	132
Cataño	Jardines de Cataño	Martinal Property Corp.	180
Cataño	Juana Matos I	Martinal Property Corp.	400
Cataño	Juana Matos II	Martinal Property Corp.	200
Cataño	Juana Matos III	Martinal Property Corp.	200
Cataño	Las Palmas	Martinal Property Corp.	400
Cataño	Rosendo Matienzo Cintrón	Martinal Property Corp.	160
Cayey	Alturas de Montellanos	M. J. Consulting & Dev., Inc.	40
Cayey	Brisas de Cayey	Cost Control Company, Inc.	210
Cayey	Jardines Buena Vista	M. J. Consulting & Dev., Inc.	1
Cayey	Jardines de Montellano	Cost Control Company, Inc.	250
Cayey	Luis Muñoz Morales	M. J. Consulting & Dev., Inc.	280
Cayey	Villas de Johnny Toledo	M. J. Consulting & Dev., Inc.	54
Ceiba	Jardines de Ceiba	Mora Housing Management, Inc.	50
Ceiba	La Ceiba	Mora Housing Management, Inc.	70
Ciales	Alturas de Ciales	Inn-Capital Housing Division	50
Ciales	Dos Ríos	Inn-Capital Housing Division	60
Ciales	Fernando Sierra Berdecía	Inn-Capital Housing Division	100
Cidra	Cidra Housing	M. J. Consulting & Dev., Inc.	6
Cidra	Jardines de Cidra	M. J. Consulting & Dev., Inc.	70
Cidra	Práxedes Santiago	Cost Control Company, Inc.	124
Coamo	Coamo Housing	Individual Management and Consultant, Inc.	88
Coamo	Jardín el Edén	Individual Management and Consultant, Inc.	150
Coamo	Las Palmas	Individual Management and Consultant, Inc.	120
Comerio	Manuel Martorell	Martinal Property Corp.	150
Corozal	Alturas del Cibuco	Inn-Capital Housing Division	19
Corozal	Enrique Landrón	Inn-Capital Housing Division	100
Dorado	El Dorado	Cost Control Company, Inc.	78
Fajardo	Pedro Rosario Nieves	Cost Control Company, Inc.	210
Fajardo	Puerto Real	Mora Housing Management, Inc.	100
Fajardo	Santiago Veve Calzada	Mora Housing Management, Inc.	100
Fajardo	Valle Puerto Real	Mora Housing Management, Inc.	75
Florida	Florida Housing	Inn-Capital Housing Division	30
Guánica	Jardines de Guánica	J. A. Machuca & Assoc.	70
Guánica	Luis Muñoz Rivera	Cost Control Company, Inc.	200
Guayama	Carioca	Cost Control Company, Inc.	200
Guayama	Fernando Calimano	M. J. Consulting & Dev., Inc.	146
Guayama	Jardines de Guamaní	M. J. Consulting & Dev., Inc.	100
Guayama	Luis Palés Matos	M. J. Consulting & Dev., Inc.	298
Guayama	Valles de Guayama	M. J. Consulting & Dev., Inc.	50
Guayanilla	Bahia	J. A. Machuca & Assoc.	50
Guayanilla	Padre Nazario	J. A. Machuca & Assoc.	120
Guaynabo	Jardines de Guaynabo	Martinal Property Corp.	80
Guaynabo	La Rosaleda	Martinal Property Corp.	136
Guaynabo	Rafael Martínez Nadal	Martinal Property Corp.	92
Guaynabo	Villas de Mabó	Martinal Property Corp.	124
Guaynabo	Zenón Díaz Varcárcel	Martinal Property Corp.	200
Gurabo	Luis C. Echevarría	M. J. Consulting & Dev., Inc.	100
Hatillo	Agustín Ruiz Miranda	American Management	80
Hatillo	Hatillo del Mar (Oscar Colón Delgado)	American Management	60
Hormigueros	Gabriel Soler Cátala	J. A. Machuca & Assoc.	64
Humacao	Jardines de Oriente	Cost Control Company, Inc.	200
Humacao	Padre Rivera	Mora Housing Management, Inc.	260
Humacao	Pedro J. Palou	Mora Housing Management, Inc.	150
Isabela	Alturas de Isabela	American Management	104
Isabela	Jardines del Noroeste	American Management	98
Isabela	Vistas de Isabela	American Management	33
Isabela	Vistas de Isabela II	American Management	95
Jayuya	Hayuya II	Individual Management and Consultant, Inc.	50
Jayuya	La Montaña	Individual Management and Consultant, Inc.	100
Jayuya	Mattei I	Individual Management and Consultant, Inc.	46
Jayuya	Mattei II	Individual Management and Consultant, Inc.	30
Juana Díaz	Leonardo Santiago	M. J. Consulting & Dev., Inc.	100
Juana Díaz	San Martín	M. J. Consulting & Dev., Inc.	44
Juana Díaz	Villa del Parque	M. J. Consulting & Dev., Inc.	100
Juncos	Antulio López (El Valenciano)	M. J. Consulting & Dev., Inc.	109
Juncos	Colinas de Magnolia	M. J. Consulting & Dev., Inc.	148
Juncos	Narciso Varona	M. J. Consulting & Dev., Inc.	260
Lajas	Las Américas	J. A. Machuca & Assoc.	80
Lares	Colinas del Expreso	American Management	20
Las Marías	Jardines de Las Marías	J. A. Machuca & Assoc.	55
Las Piedras	Ext. Jardines de Judely	M. J. Consulting & Dev., Inc.	70
Las Piedras	Jardines de Judely	M. J. Consulting & Dev., Inc.	32
Las Piedras	La Ribera	M. J. Consulting & Dev., Inc.	100
Loíza	San Patricio	Mora Housing Management, Inc.	50
Loíza	Yuquiyú I	Mora Housing Management, Inc.	100
Luquillo	Diego Zalduondo Veve	Mora Housing Management, Inc.	110
Luquillo	El Cemi	Mora Housing Management, Inc.	100
Luquillo	El Cemi II	Mora Housing Management, Inc.	50
Luquillo	Yuquiyú II	Cost Control Company, Inc.	70
Manatí	Brisas de Campo Alegre (Nuevo Manatí)	Inn-Capital Housing Division	149
Manatí	Enrique Zorrilla	Inn-Capital Housing Division	280
Manatí	Los Murales	Inn-Capital Housing Division	214
Manatí	Villa Evangelina II	Inn-Capital Housing Division	1
Manatí	Villa Evangelina III	Inn-Capital Housing Division	1
Manatí	Villa Evangelina IV	Inn-Capital Housing Division	58
Manatí	Vistas de Atenas	Inn-Capital Housing Division	76
Manatí	Vivameri Apartments	Inn-Capital Housing Division	144
Maricao	Colinas de Maricao	J. A. Machuca & Assoc.	24
Maricao	Juan Ferrer	J. A. Machuca & Assoc.	30
Maunabo	Carmen Vda. de Martorell	M. J. Consulting & Dev., Inc.	50
Maunabo	Jardines del Almendro	M. J. Consulting & Dev., Inc.	37
Maunabo	Villa Navarro	M. J. Consulting & Dev., Inc.	58
Mayagüez	Columbus Landing	J. A. Machuca & Assoc.	476
Mayagüez	Cuesta de las Piedras	J. A. Machuca & Assoc.	142
Mayagüez	El Carmen	J. A. Machuca & Assoc.	252
Mayagüez	Flamboyán Gardens	J. A. Machuca & Assoc.	74
Mayagüez	Franklin Delano Roosevelt	J. A. Machuca & Assoc.	600
Mayagüez	Jardines de Concordia	J. A. Machuca & Assoc.	200
Mayagüez	Manuel Hernández Rosa (Candelaria)	J. A. Machuca & Assoc.	268
Mayagüez	Mar y Sol	J. A. Machuca & Assoc.	124
Mayagüez	Mayagüez Gardens	J. A. Machuca & Assoc.	71
Mayagüez	Mayagüez Housing I	J. A. Machuca & Assoc.	48
Mayagüez	Mayagüez Housing II (La Arboleda)	J. A. Machuca & Assoc.	50
Mayagüez	Monte Isleño	J. A. Machuca & Assoc.	185
Mayagüez	Parque Sultana I	J. A. Machuca & Assoc.	74
Mayagüez	Rafael Hernández (Kennedy)	J. A. Machuca & Assoc.	274
Mayagüez	Ramírez de Arellano	J. A. Machuca & Assoc.	80
Mayagüez	Sábalos Gardens	J. A. Machuca & Assoc.	140
Mayagüez	Sábalos Nuevos (Ext. Sábalos Gardens)	Cost Control Company, Inc.	300
Mayagüez	Yagüez	J. A. Machuca & Assoc.	200
Moca	José Gándara	American Management	74
Moca	La Cruz	American Management	68
Morovis	Tomás Sorolla	Inn-Capital Housing Division	74
Naguabo	Ignacio Morales Dávila	Mora Housing Management, Inc.	148
Naguabo	Los Valles	Mora Housing Management, Inc.	24
Naguabo	Naguabo Valley	Mora Housing Management, Inc.	37
Naguabo	Torres del Río	Mora Housing Management, Inc.	36
Naguabo	Villas del Río	Cost Control Company, Inc.	100
Naranjito	Candelario Torres	Inn-Capital Housing Division	80
Orocovis	José V. Fortis	M. J. Consulting & Dev., Inc.	70
Orocovis	Villas de Orocovis	M. J. Consulting & Dev., Inc.	50
Patillas	Villa Real	M. J. Consulting & Dev., Inc.	70
Patillas	Villas del Caribe	M. J. Consulting & Dev., Inc.	70
Peñuelas	Los Flamboyanes	Individual Management and Consultant, Inc.	70
Ponce	Arístides Chavier	Cost Control Company, Inc.	480
Ponce	Canas Housing	Individual Management and Consultant, Inc.	51
Ponce	Caribe	Individual Management and Consultant, Inc.	116
Ponce	Copper View	Individual Management and Consultant, Inc.	50
Ponce	1ra Ext. Dr. Pila	Individual Management and Consultant, Inc.	586
Ponce	Ernesto Ramos Antonini	Individual Management and Consultant, Inc.	350
Ponce	Manuel de la Pila Iglesias	Individual Management and Consultant, Inc.	120
Ponce	2da Ext. Dr. Pila	Individual Management and Consultant, Inc.	200
Ponce	Golden View	Individual Management and Consultant, Inc.	50
Ponce	José N. Gándara	Individual Management and Consultant, Inc.	270
Ponce	José Tormos Diego	Individual Management and Consultant, Inc.	168
Ponce	La Ceiba	Cost Control Company, Inc.	300
Ponce	Las Delicias	Individual Management and Consultant, Inc.	7
Ponce	Lirios del Sur	Individual Management and Consultant, Inc.	400
Ponce	Los Rosales	Individual Management and Consultant, Inc.	180
Ponce	Pedro J. Rosaly	Individual Management and Consultant, Inc.	238
Ponce	Perla del Bucaná	Individual Management and Consultant, Inc.	50
Ponce	Perla del Caribe	Individual Management and Consultant, Inc.	272
Ponce	Ponce de León	Cost Control Company, Inc.	300
Ponce	Ponce Housing	Individual Management and Consultant, Inc.	131
Ponce	Hogares del Portugués	Individual Management and Consultant, Inc.	152
Ponce	Rafael López Nussa	Cost Control Company, Inc.	404
Ponce	Santiago Iglesias	Individual Management and Consultant, Inc.	280
Ponce	Silver Valley	Individual Management and Consultant, Inc.	50
Ponce	Villa Elena	Individual Management and Consultant, Inc.	100
Quebradillas	Francisco Vigo Salas	American Management	100
Quebradillas	Guarionex	American Management	100
Rincón	Santa Rosa	American Management	74
Río Grande	Galateo Apts.	Mora Housing Management, Inc.	63
Río Grande	José H. Ramírez	Mora Housing Management, Inc.	80
Sabana Grande	José Castillo Mercado	American Management	148
Salinas	Bella Vista	M. J. Consulting & Dev., Inc.	100
Salinas	Brisas del Mar	M. J. Consulting & Dev., Inc.	92
San Germán	El Recreo	American Management	300
San Germán	Manuel F. Rossy	American Management	101
San Juan	Alejandrino	Martinal Property Corp.	294
San Juan	Alturas de Cupey	A & M Contract, Inc.	250
San Juan	Antigua Vía y Park Court	A & M Contract, Inc.	13
San Juan	Beatriz Lasalle	A & M Contract, Inc.	100
San Juan	Brisas de Cupey	A & M Contract, Inc.	184
San Juan	El Manantial	Martinal Property Corp.	200
San Juan	El Prado	MAS Corporation	220
San Juan	El Trébol	MAS Corporation	152
San Juan	Emiliano Pol	S. P. Management, Corp.	208
San Juan	Ernesto Ramos Antonini	MAS Corporation	864
San Juan	Ext. Manuel A. Pérez	MAS Corporation	900
San Juan	Ext. Manuel A. Pérez	MAS Corporation	312
San Juan	Jardines de Monte Hatillo	A & M Contract, Inc.	698
San Juan	Jardines de Campo Rico	Cost Control Company, Inc.	196
San Juan	Jardines de Country Club	Mora Housing Management, Inc.	113
San Juan	Jardines de Cupey	Cost Control Company, Inc.	308
San Juan	Jardines de Quintana	Martinal Property Corp.	2
San Juan	Jardines del Paraíso	Mora Housing Management, Inc.	298
San Juan	Jardines la Nueva Puerta de San Juan	MAS Corporation	40
San Juan	Jardines Sellés I	MAS Corporation	300
San Juan	Jardines Sellés II	MAS Corporation	100
San Juan	Juan César Cordero Dávila	Martinal Property Corp.	508
San Juan	La Rosa	MAS Corporation	52
San Juan	Las Camelias Apartments	MAS Corporation	166
San Juan	Las Casas	MAS Corporation	420
San Juan	Las Dalias	Cost Control Company, Inc.	240
San Juan	Las Margaritas I	S. P. Management, Corp.	344
San Juan	Las Margaritas II	S. P. Management, Corp.	325
San Juan	Las Margaritas III	S. P. Management, Corp.	231
San Juan	Leopoldo Figueroa	A & M Contract, Inc.	240
San Juan	Los Laureles	A & M Contract, Inc.	194
San Juan	Los Lirios	S. P. Management, Corp.	150
San Juan	Los Lirios	A & M Contract, Inc.	130
San Juan	Los Peñas	MAS Corporation	200
San Juan	Luis Lloréns Torres	S. P. Management, Corp.	2570
San Juan	Manuel A. Pérez	MAS Corporation	850
San Juan	Monte Park	A & M Contract, Inc.	304
San Juan	Nemesio R. Canales	Martinal Property Corp.	1126
San Juan	Park Court	A & M Contract, Inc.	80
San Juan	Parque San Agustín	S. P. Management, Corp.	80
San Juan	Puerta de Tierra II	S. P. Management, Corp.	85
San Juan	San Agustín	S. P. Management, Corp.	84
San Juan	San Antonio	S. P. Management, Corp.	132
San Juan	San Fernando	Cost Control Company, Inc.	334
San Juan	San Martín	Mora Housing Management, Inc.	300
San Juan	Santa Elena	A & M Contract, Inc.	168
San Juan	Torre de Francia	Martinal Property Corp.	100
San Juan	Villa Andalucía I	A & M Contract, Inc.	80
San Juan	Villa Andalucía II	A & M Contract, Inc.	82
San Juan	Villa España	Cost Control Company, Inc.	500
San Juan	Villa Esperanza	A & M Contract, Inc.	300
San Juan	Vista Hermosa I, II, III	A & M Contract, Inc.	894
San Lorenzo	La Lorenzana	Cost Control Company, Inc.	100
San Lorenzo	Villas de San Lorenzo	Cost Control Company, Inc.	12
San Sebastián	Andrés Mendez Liceaga	Cost Control Company, Inc.	150
San Sebastián	Hacienda San Andrés	American Management	150
San Sebastián	San Sebastián Court	Cost Control Company, Inc.	60
Santa Isabel	El Taíno	M. J. Consulting & Dev., Inc.	95
Santa Isabel	Estancias de Santa Isabel	M. J. Consulting & Dev., Inc.	9
Santa Isabel	Pedro M. Descartes	M. J. Consulting & Dev., Inc.	110
Santa Isabel	Rincón Taíno	M. J. Consulting & Dev., Inc.	100
Toa Alta	Jardines de San Fernando	Inn-Capital Housing Division	70
Toa Alta	Ramón Pérez Rodríguez	Inn-Capital Housing Division	80
Toa Baja	El Toa	Inn-Capital Housing Division	80
Toa Baja	Villas de Sabana	Inn-Capital Housing Division	83
Trujillo Alto	Nuestra Señora de Covadonga	A & M Contract, Inc.	504
Trujillo Alto	Los Cedros	A & M Contract, Inc.	324
Trujillo Alto	Los Rosales	A & M Contract, Inc.	74
Trujillo Alto	Pedro Regalado Díaz	A & M Contract, Inc.	50
Utuado	Fernando Luis García	Inn-Capital Housing Division	200
Utuado	Jardines de Utuado	Inn-Capital Housing Division	100
Utuado	Jesús M. Lago	Inn-Capital Housing Division	2
Vega Alta	El Batey	Inn-Capital Housing Division	91
Vega Alta	Francisco Vega Sánchez	Inn-Capital Housing Division	100
Vega Alta	Las Violetas	Cost Control Company, Inc.	88
Vega Baja	Alturas de Vega Baja	Inn-Capital Housing Division	14
Vega Baja	Enrique Catoni	Inn-Capital Housing Division	148
Vieques	Cesar "Coca" González	Mora Housing Management, Inc.	83
Vieques	Jardines de Vieques	Mora Housing Management, Inc.	50
Villalba	Efraín Suárez	Individual Management and Consultant, Inc.	60
Villalba	Enudio Negrón	Individual Management and Consultant, Inc.	74
Villalba	Máximo Miranda Jiménez	Individual Management and Consultant, Inc.	100
Yabucoa	Dr. Víctor Berrios	Mora Housing Management, Inc.	144
Yabucoa	Ext. Santa Elena	Mora Housing Management, Inc.	43
Yabucoa	Reparto Horizonte	Mora Housing Management, Inc.	37
Yauco	Ext. Santa Catalina	J. A. Machuca & Assoc.	24
Yauco	Santa Catalina	J. A. Machuca & Assoc.	200
Yauco	Villas del Cafetal (Yauco Housing)	J. A. Machuca & Assoc.	79

== Public Housing Authorities ==
Public Housing Authorities are government agencies designated by the US Department of Housing and Urban Development to administer federally subsidized housing units, which are known as Section 8 housing.

Source: Public Housing Agency (HA) Profiles, US Department of Housing and Urban Development

PHA Code (RQ Number)	Name	Government type	Type of public housing	Total rentable units
RQ005	Puerto Rico Public Housing Authority (PRPHA)	State	Low-Rent	54002
RQ006	Municipality of San Juan	Local	Section 8	5148
RQ007	Municipality of Caguas	Local	Section 8	1325
RQ008	Municipality of Ponce	Local	Section 8	1608
RQ009	Municipality of Mayagüez	Local	Section 8	842
RQ010	Municipality of Moca	Local	Section 8	67
RQ011	Municipality of Bayamón	Local	Section 8	2253
RQ012	Municipality of Aguadilla	Local	Section 8	295
RQ013	Municipality of Trujillo Alto	Local	Section 8	505
RQ014	Municipality of Carolina	Local	Section 8	805
RQ015	Municipality of Dorado	Local	Section 8	277
RQ016	Municipality of Guaynabo	Local	Section 8	383
RQ017	Municipality of Guayama	Local	Section 8	264
RQ018	Municipality of Cayey	Local	Section 8	239
RQ019	Municipality of Peñuelas	Local	Section 8	240
RQ020	Municipality of Arecibo	Local	Section 8	928
RQ021	Municipality of Guayanilla	Local	Section 8	146
RQ022	Municipality of Toa Baja	Local	Section 8	244
RQ023	Municipality of Corozal	Local	Section 8	139
RQ024	Municipality of Morovis	Local	Section 8	53
RQ025	Municipality of Humacao	Local	Section 8	276
RQ026	Municipality of San Sebastián	Local	Section 8	139
RQ027	Municipality of Loíza	Local	Section 8	5
RQ028	Municipality of Manatí	Local	Section 8	182
RQ029	Municipality of Maricao	Local	Section 8	35
RQ030	Municipality of San Germán	Local	Section 8	88
RQ031	Municipality of Quebradillas	Local	Section 8	141
RQ032	Municipality of Vega Baja	Local	Section 8	277
RQ033	Municipality of Utuado	Local	Section 8	197
RQ034	Municipality of Comerio	Local	Section 8	118
RQ035	Municipality of Hormigueros	Local	Section 8	103
RQ036	Municipality of Fajardo	Local	Section 8	109
RQ037	Municipality of San Lorenzo	Local	Section 8	107
RQ038	Municipality of Juana Díaz	Local	Section 8	115
RQ039	Municipality of Hatillo	Local	Section 8	73
RQ040	Municipality of Camuy	Local	Section 8	156
RQ041	Municipality of Gurabo	Local	Section 8	143
RQ042	Municipality of Coamo	Local	Section 8	60
RQ043	Municipality of Añasco	Local	Section 8	110
RQ044	Municipality of Guánica	Local	Section 8	54
RQ045	Municipality of Yabucoa	Local	Section 8	117
RQ046	Municipality of Las Marías	Local	Section 8	40
RQ047	Municipality of Naguabo	Local	Section 8	121
RQ048	Municipality of Sabana Grande	Local	Section 8	156
RQ049	Municipality of Villalba	Local	Section 8	84
RQ050	Municipality of Río Grande	Local	Section 8	78
RQ052	Municipality of Ciales	Local	Section 8	74
RQ053	Municipality of Toa Alta	Local	Section 8	181
RQ054	Municipality of Barceloneta	Local	Section 8	125
RQ055	Municipality of Adjuntas	Local	Section 8	52
RQ056	Municipality of Vega Alta	Local	Section 8	76
RQ057	Municipality of Patillas	Local	Section 8	83
RQ058	Municipality of Santa Isabel	Local	Section 8	70
RQ059	Municipality of Aibonito	Local	Section 8	58
RQ060	Municipality of Barranquitas	Local	Section 8	180
RQ061	Municipality of Cabo Rojo	Local	Section 8	107
RQ062	Municipality of Cidra	Local	Section 8	190
RQ063	Municipality of Las Piedras	Local	Section 8	125
RQ064	Municipality of Naranjito	Local	Section 8	123
RQ065	Municipality of Lares	Local	Section 8	73
RQ066	Municipality of Isabela	Local	Section 8	86
RQ067	Municipality of Rincón	Local	Section 8	34
RQ068	Municipality of Arroyo	Local	Section 8	217
RQ069	Municipality of Salinas	Local	Section 8	97
RQ070	Municipality of Ceiba	Local	Section 8	41
RQ071	Municipality of Lajas	Local	Section 8	69
RQ072	Municipality of Florida	Local	Section 8	45
RQ073	Municipality of Aguada	Local	Section 8	121
RQ074	Municipality of Vieques	Local	Section 8	116
RQ075	Municipality of Canóvanas	Local	Section 8	34
RQ076	Municipality of Jayuya	Local	Section 8	4
RQ077	Municipality of Juncos	Local	Section 8	55
RQ080	Municipality of Orocovis	Local	Section 8	47
RQ081	Municipality of Luquillo	Local	Section 8	69
RQ082	Municipality of Aguas Buenas	Local	Section 8	161
RQ083	Municipality of Yauco	Local	Section 8	95
RQ901	Puerto Rico Department of Housing Res. Jardines de Guanica	State	Section 8	8510
RQ911	Puerto Rico Housing Finance Company	State	Section 8	2577

== Gallery ==
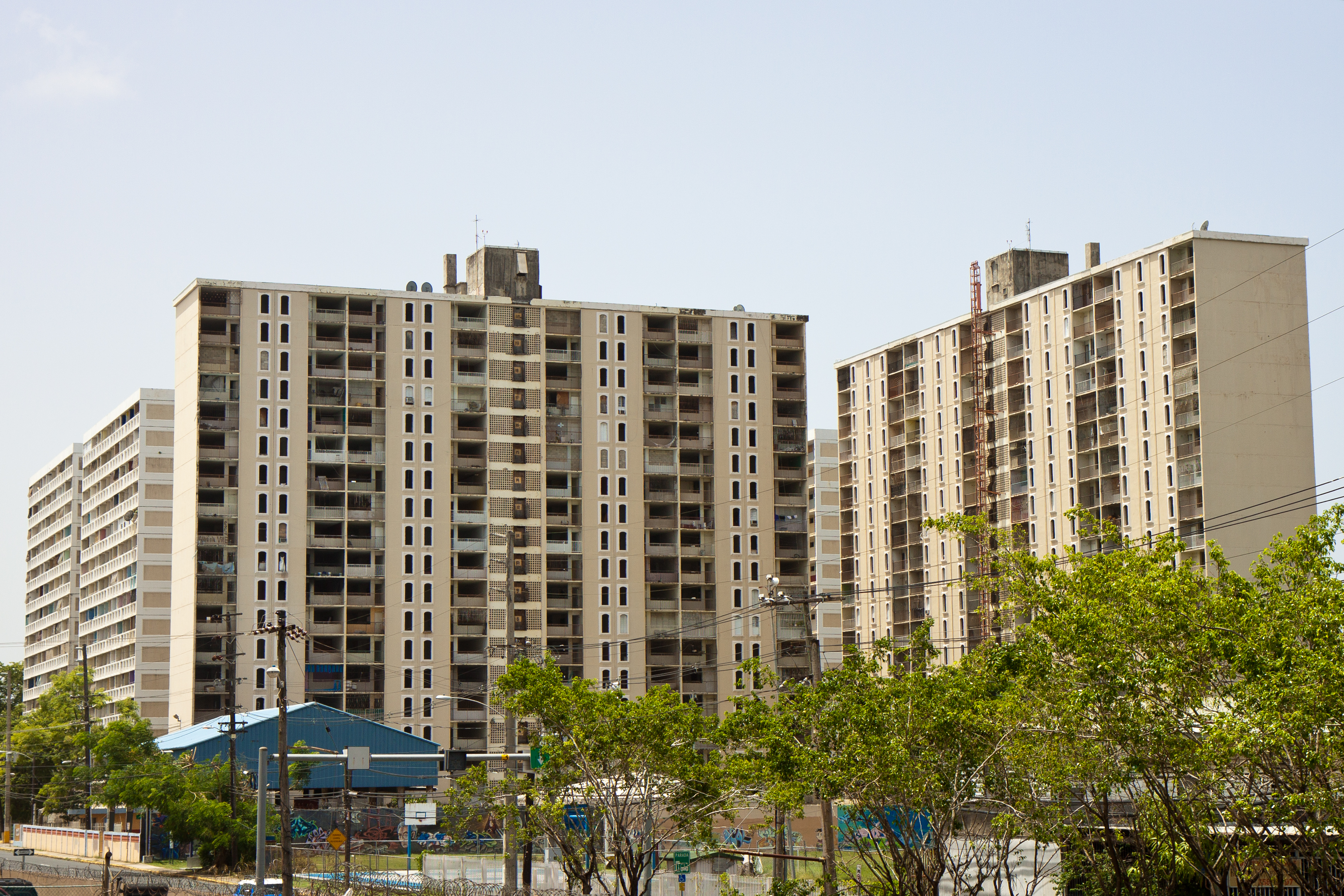
Las Gladiolas public housing complex in Hato Rey before its demolition

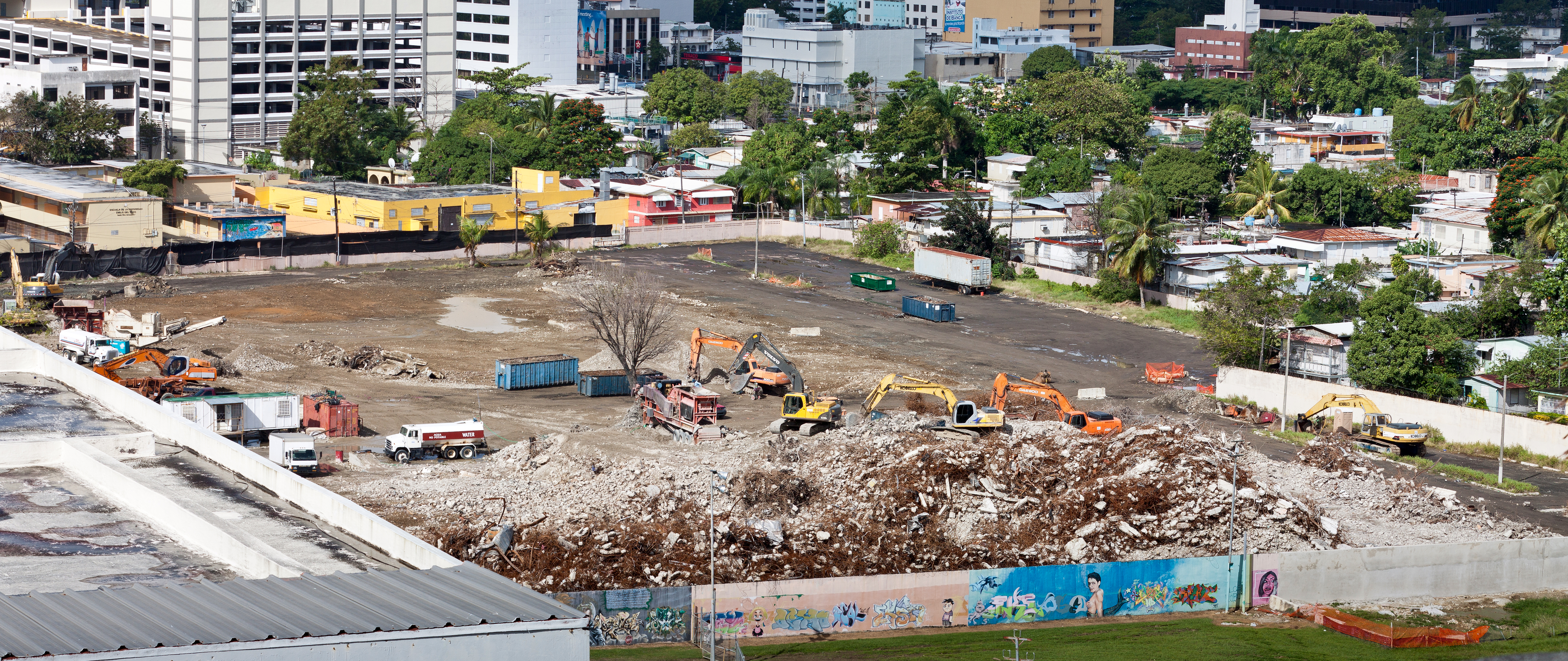
Las Gladiolas site in Hato Rey after its demolition on July 25, 2011

== See also ==
- Public housing
- Section 8 (housing)
