= TCAP =

TCAP may refer to:

== Science ==
- Acetone peroxide, the trimer version tri-cyclic acetone peroxide, a high explosive
- Telethonin, a protein encoded by the TCAP gene

== Education ==
- Tennessee Comprehensive Assessment Program, a public school standardized testing program
- Transitional Colorado Assessment Program, a public school standardized testing program that replaced the Colorado Student Assessment Program

== Finance ==
- Tax Credit Assistance Program, a U.S. federal housing grant program
- Thanachart Capital PCL (stock ticker: TCAP), the holding company of TBank, the Thanachart Bank

== Other uses ==
- Taipei Children's Amusement Park, an amusement park in Taipei, Taiwan
- To Catch a Predator, American reality television news segment of Dateline NBC, which used hidden cameras to catch child sex predators
- Transaction Capabilities Application Part (ITU-T Q.771-Q.775 or ANSI T1.114) a protocol to allow multiple simultaneous dialogs on the same subsystem
- Catholic Tercio of Political Action Party (Spanish: TCAP) a local political party in Madrid in 2007, see Results breakdown of the 2007 Spanish local elections (Community of Madrid)

== See also ==
- Traverse City Area Public Schools (TCAPS)
