= Slow photography =

Photography technique

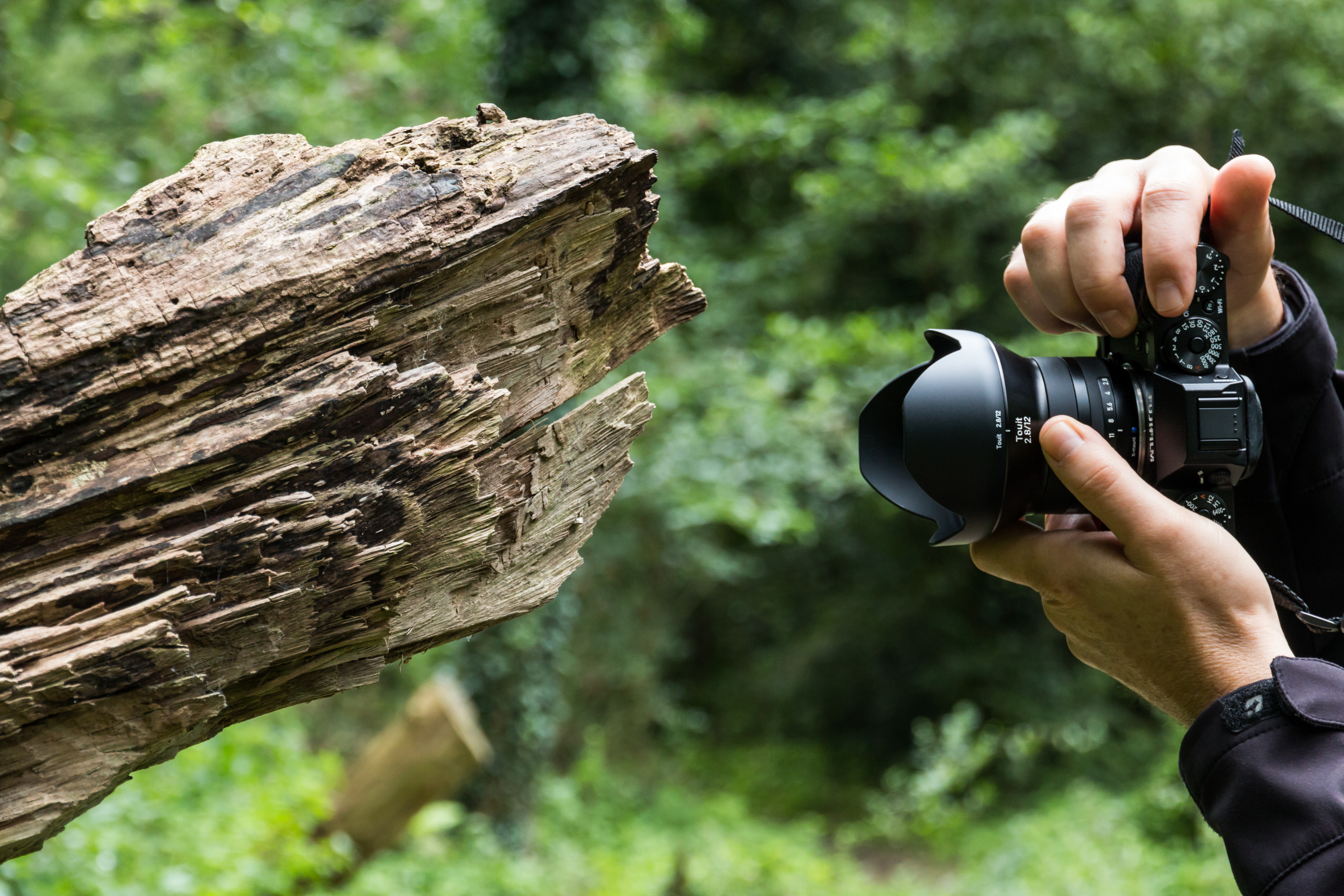

Slow photography is a contemporary movement that prioritizes the process and experience of taking photos over the work of documentation. It typically involves film photography, although the method can be utilized using any camera.

In response to the spread of digital photography and the snapshot, artists and photographers utilize manual techniques and working methods to work slower, manually and in constant dialogue with the physical materials of the images.

The concept was defined by David Campany in his 2003 essay "Safety in Numbness: Some remarks on the problems of ‘Late Photography.’" Campany uses the example of the post-9/11 photography of Joel Meyerowitz, later published in Aftermath to demonstrate the importance of photography for public memory. He argues that late photography is undertaken after an event has occurred.

It is a technique utilized by Norwegian photographer, artist and photo educator Johanne Seines Svendsen. She uses long exposure times and the wetplate collodion process for her photos. Her series, "The Slow Photography," was featured at the 67th North Norwegian Art Exhibition in Bodø in January 2013. The installation contained five original ambrotypes and alumitypes presented in a monter. Seines Svendsen describes her process in "The Slow Photography – In Motion," published in Through a Glass, Darkly, a photography collection, in January 2013 in collaboration with the North Norwegian Art Center, The Arts Council of Norway, and the Norwegian Photographical Fund.

Slow photography can be seen in the context of cultural, political and environmental tendencies and associated with other elements of the slow movement, such as slow food.

== See also ==
- Slow movement
- Slow food
- Slow architecture
- CittaSlow (slow cities)

== Other sources ==
- Through a Glass, Darkly, Johanne Seines Svendsen, FingerPrint, 2013. ISBN 978-82-303-2243-7
