= Taraklı =

- District and municipality
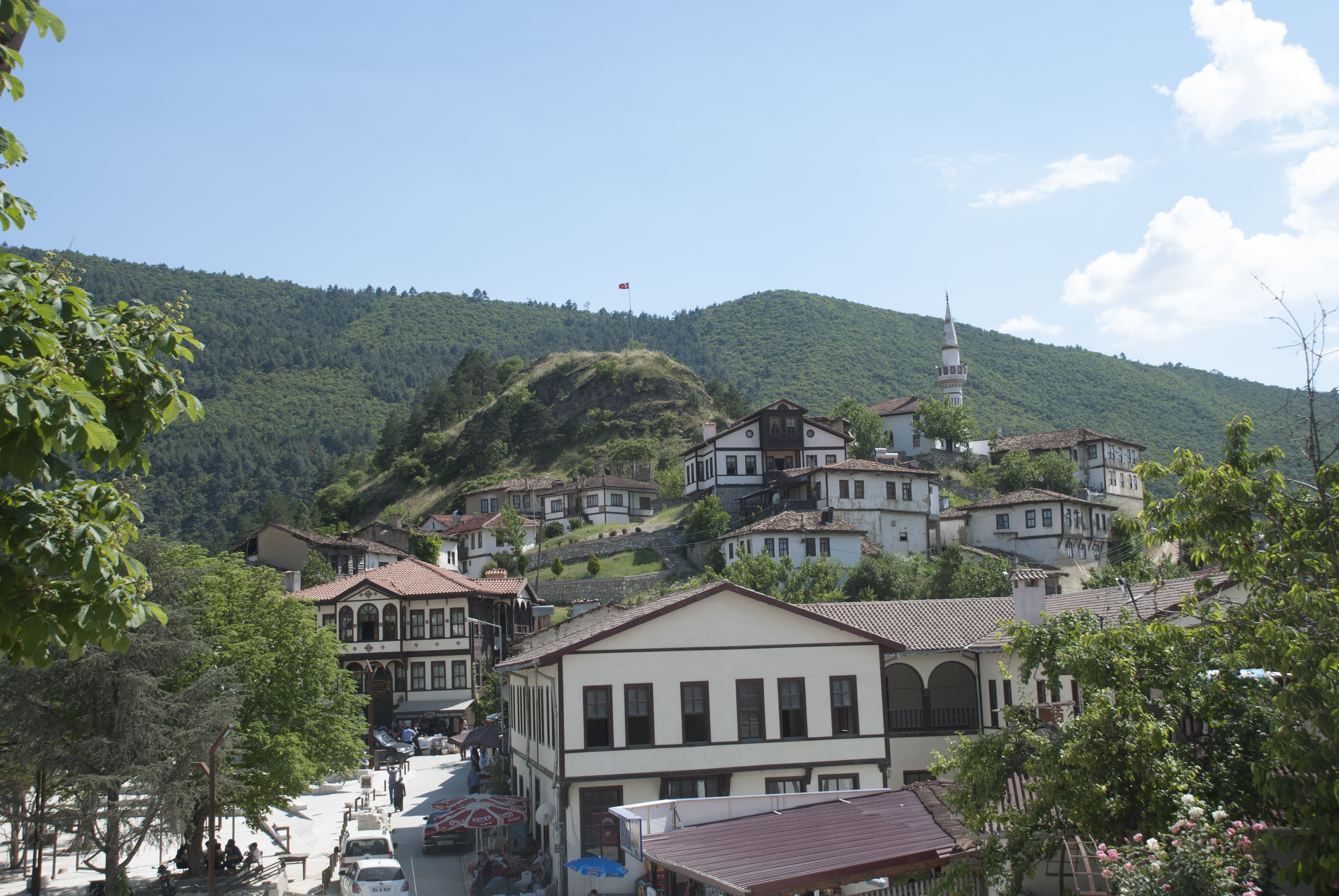
- Hisar Hill in Taraklı

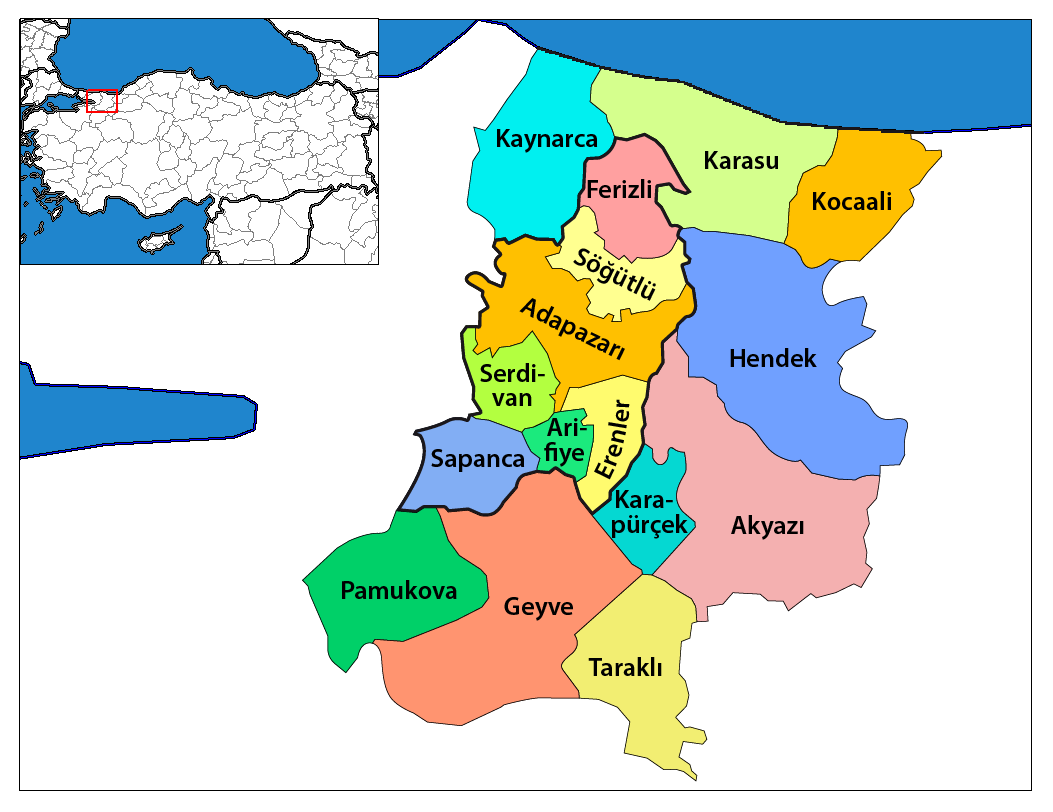
- Map showing Taraklı District in Sakarya Province

- Location within Turkey Location within Marmara
- Coordinates: 40°23′49″N 30°29′34″E
- Country: Turkey
- Province: Sakarya

Government
  - Mayor: İbrahim Pilavcı (MHP)
- Area: 292 km^{2} (113 sq mi)
- Population (2022): 6,894
  - Density: 23.6/km^{2} (61.1/sq mi)
- Time zone: UTC+3 (TRT)
- Area code: 0264
- Climate: Csb
- Website: www.tarakli.bel.tr

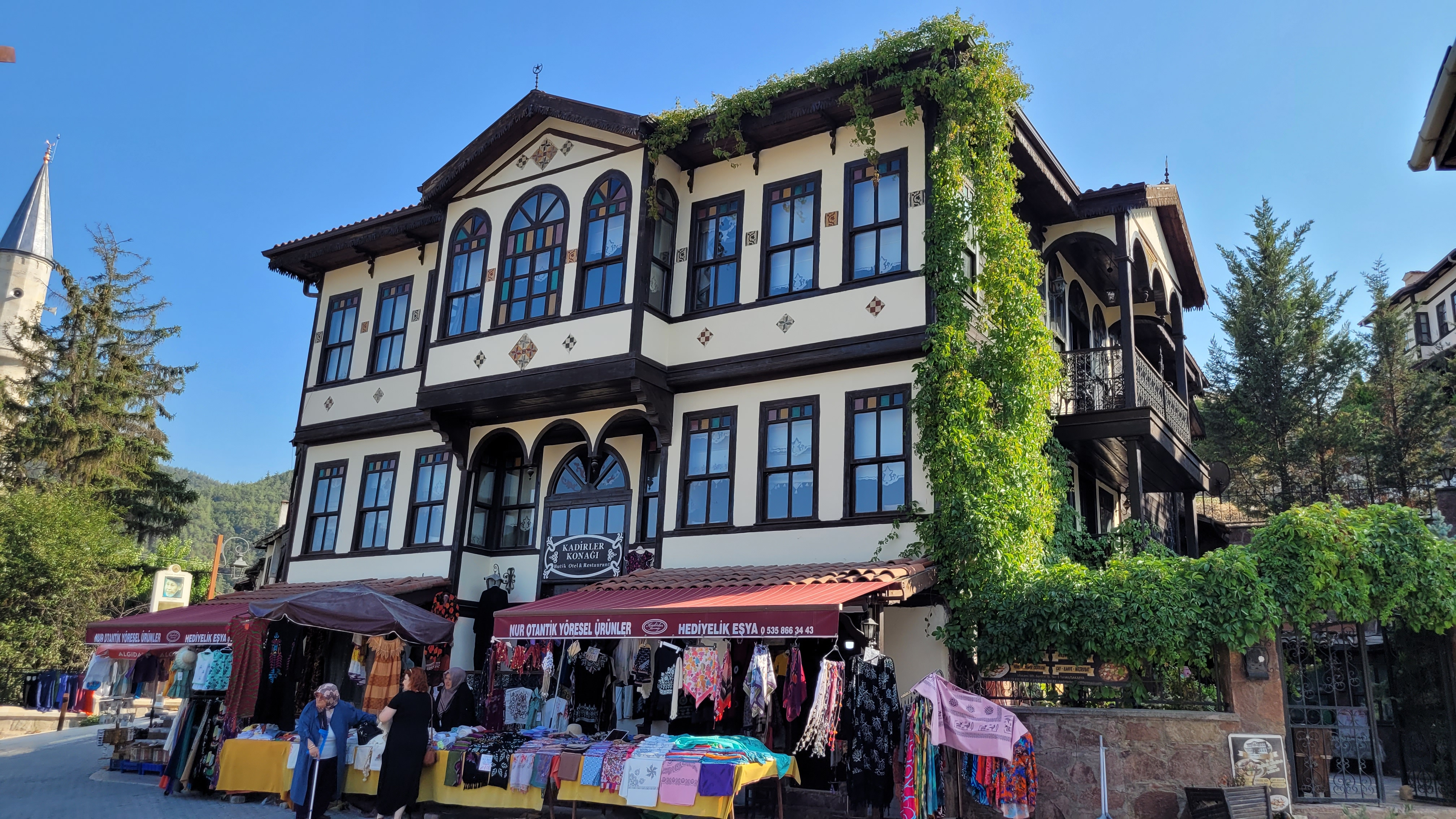
Kadir's Mansion Hotel & Restaurant

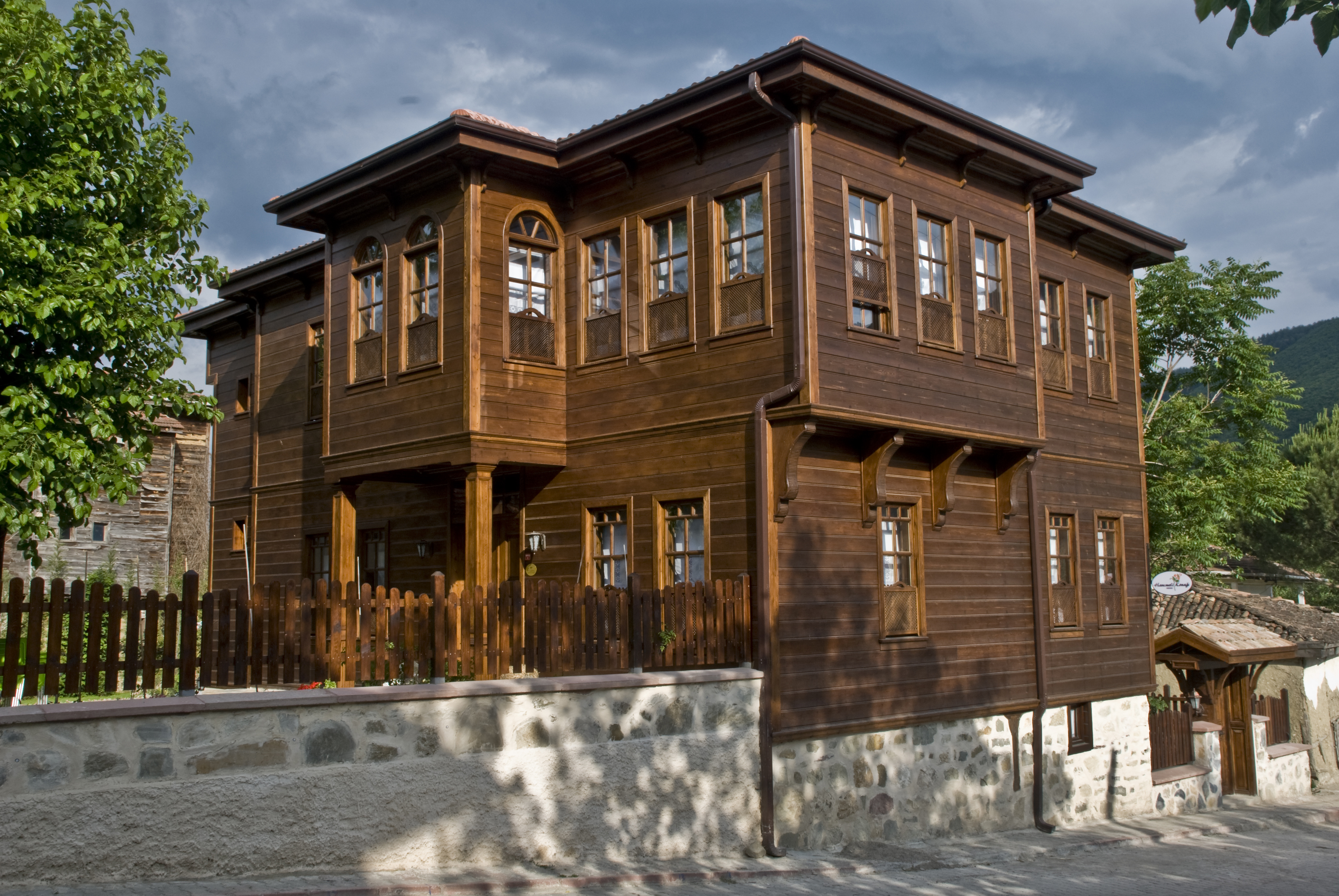
Honeysuckle Mansion

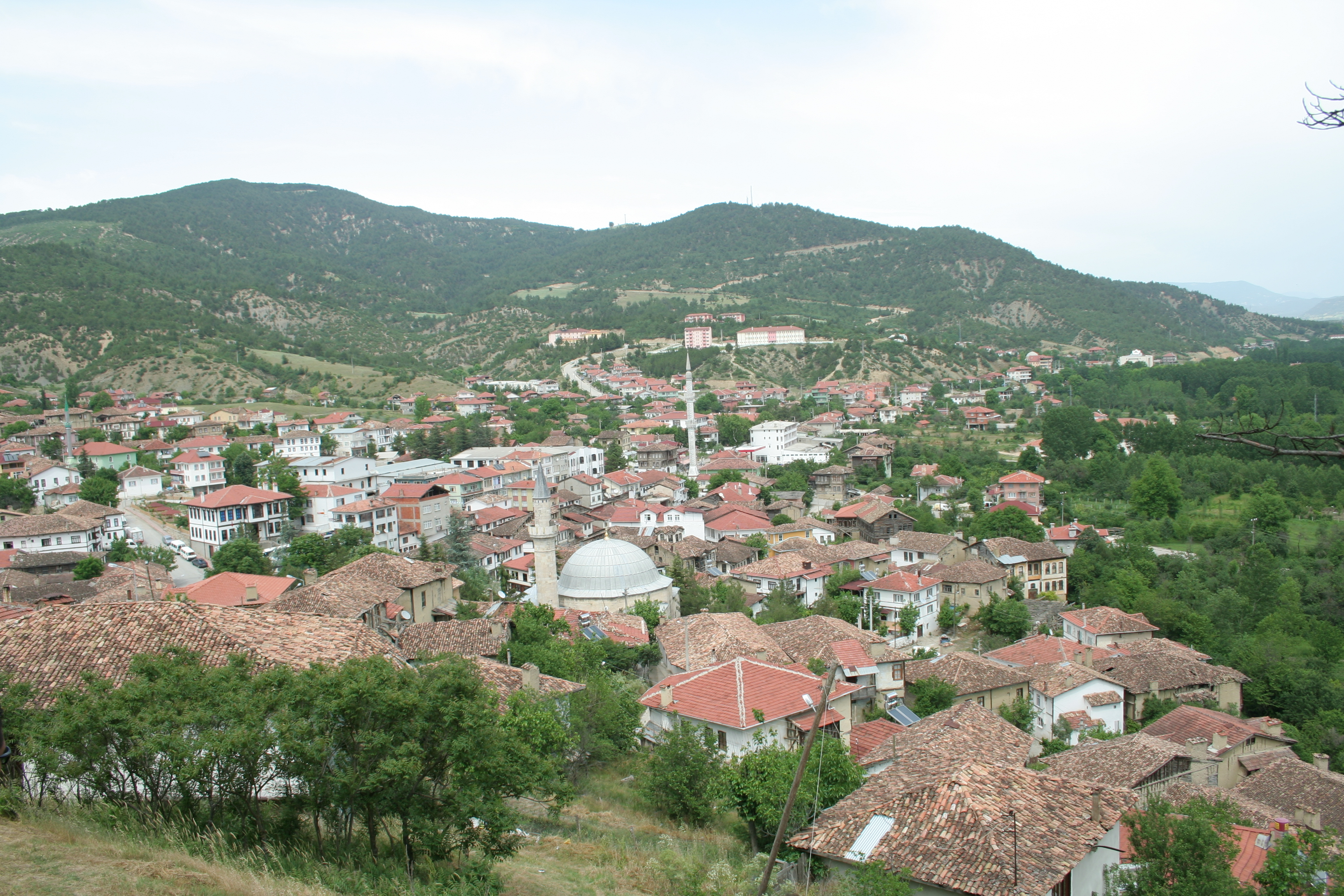
A panoramic view of Taraklı

Taraklı, formerly known as Dablar is a municipality and district of Sakarya Province, Turkey. Its area is 292 km^{2}, and its population is 6,894 (2022). It is a historic town, surrounded by forest and located approximately midway between Istanbul and Ankara. The district governor is Burak Serttaş, and the mayor is İbrahim Pilavcı (MHP).

A former member of the Cittaslow movement, Tarakli features cobblestone streets and architecture dating back to the Ottoman Empire. The town has undergone extensive renovations and has gained attention as a tourist destination. A local bazaar offers handmade crafts like wooden combs and spoons. Nearby attractions include thermal springs, the Karagöl Plateau, and Hark Canyon and Cave.

The Yunus Pasha Mosque, built in 1517 by Ottoman architect Mimar Sinan, lies at the center of Tarakli. It was built with molten lead and heated from below with steam from an adjacent public bath.

== Composition ==
There are 22 neighbourhoods in Taraklı District:

- Akçapınar
- Aksu
- Alballar
- Avdan
- Çamtepe
- Dışdedeler
- Duman
- Esenyurt
- Hacıaliler
- Hacımurat
- Hacıyakup
- Harkköy
- İçdedeler
- Kemaller
- Mahdumlar
- Pirler
- Tuzla
- Uğurlu
- Ulucami
- Yenidoğan
- Yeniköy
- Yusufbey
