= Cittaslow =

Italian organization

Cittaslow International
- Cittaslow logo
- Formation: 15 October 1999 (27 years ago)
- Headquarters: Orvieto, Italy
- Region served: Worldwide
- Members: 308 (December 2025)
- Honorary President: Paolo Saturnini
- International President: Mauro Migliorini - Mayor of Asolo
- Secretary General: Pier Giorgio Oliveti
- Website: www.cittaslow.org

Cittaslow is an organisation founded in Italy and inspired by the slow food movement. Cittaslow's goals include improving the quality of life in towns by slowing down its overall pace, especially in a city's use of spaces and the flow of life and traffic through them.

As of November 2025, Cittaslow has 308 members, 221 in Europe, 71 in Asia, 6 in North America, 4 in South America, 4 in Oceania, and 2 in Africa. Countries with most members are Italy (90), Poland (37), Turkey (28), Germany (24), China (18), South Korea (15), France (13) and Spain (11).

== History ==
Cittaslow was founded in Italy in October 1999, following a meeting organised by the mayor of Greve in Chianti, Tuscany. A 54-point charter was developed, encouraging high quality local food and drink, general conviviality and the opposition to cultural standardisation. In 2001, 28 Italian towns were signed up to the pledge, certified by trained operatives of Cittaslow.

The first Slow City in the English-speaking world was Ludlow, England, in 2003. In 2004, Reszel became the first Polish town to join Cittaslow, and several soon followed with the number growing to 12 by September 2013 and to 37 by November 2025, making Poland the country with the second highest number of member towns (after Italy).

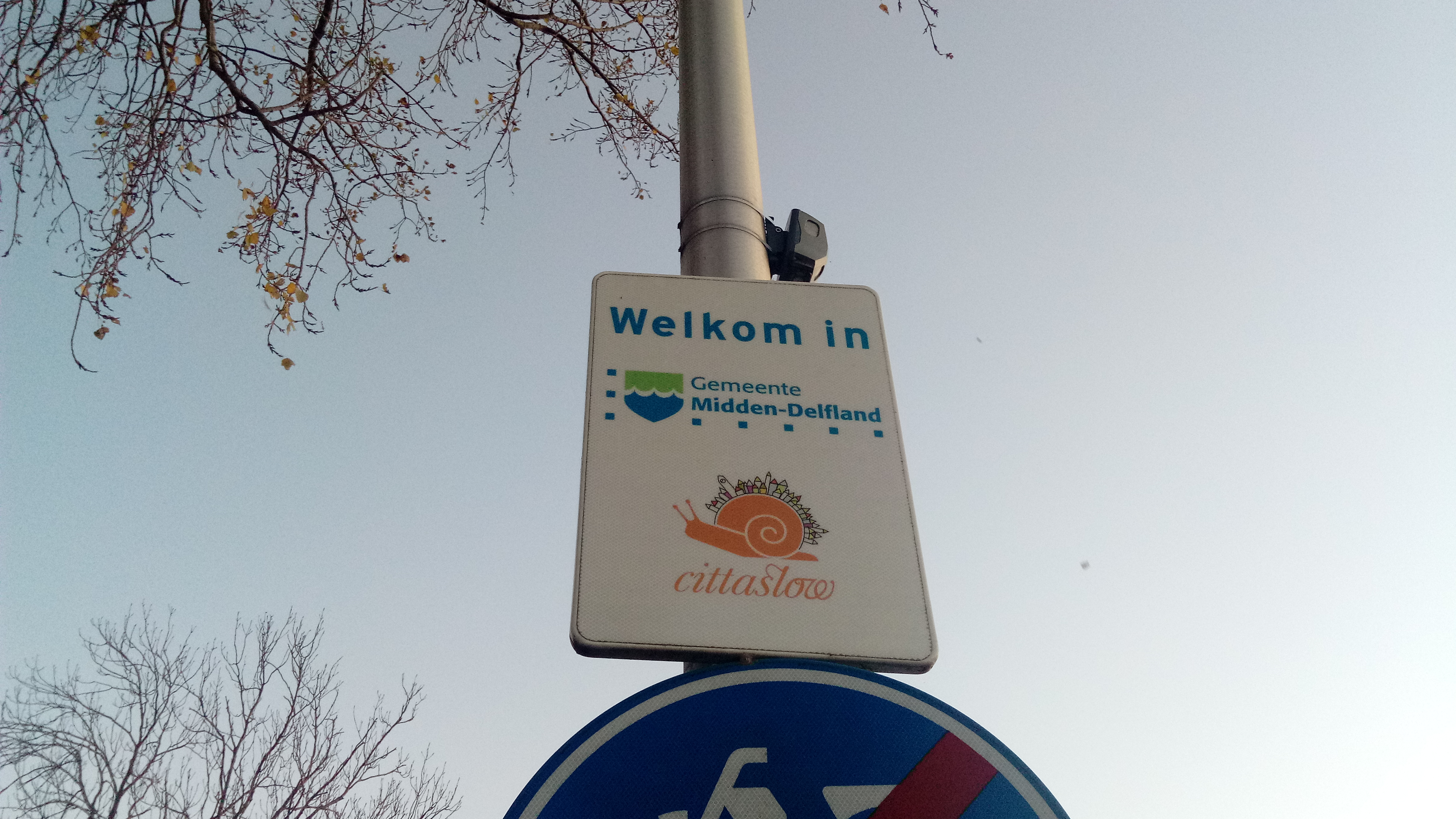
Welcome sign in Midden-Delfland, Netherlands, containing the Cittaslow logo. Midden-Delfland in 2008 was the first Dutch municipality to join

The movement expanded broadly beyond Italy and, by 2006, national Cittaslow networks existed in Germany, Norway and the United Kingdom. In March 2007 the South Australian town of Goolwa was declared a Cittaslow member and became the first Non-European to gain Cittaslow membership. By 2007, several slow cities had been introduced across South Korea.

By mid-2009, fourteen countries had at least one officially accredited Cittaslow community. In July 2009, the small seaside village of Cowichan Bay in Canada became the North American continent's first Cittaslow town. In June 2011, Gökçeada in Turkey became the first and only Cittaslow island. As of September 2013, Cittaslow had 177 members, the most in Italy (73), Poland, South Korea, Germany (12 each), Turkey (9) and France (8).

In October 2020, Izmir, Turkey's 3rd metropolitan municipality, has become The First Cittaslow Metropolis of the World.

== Membership ==
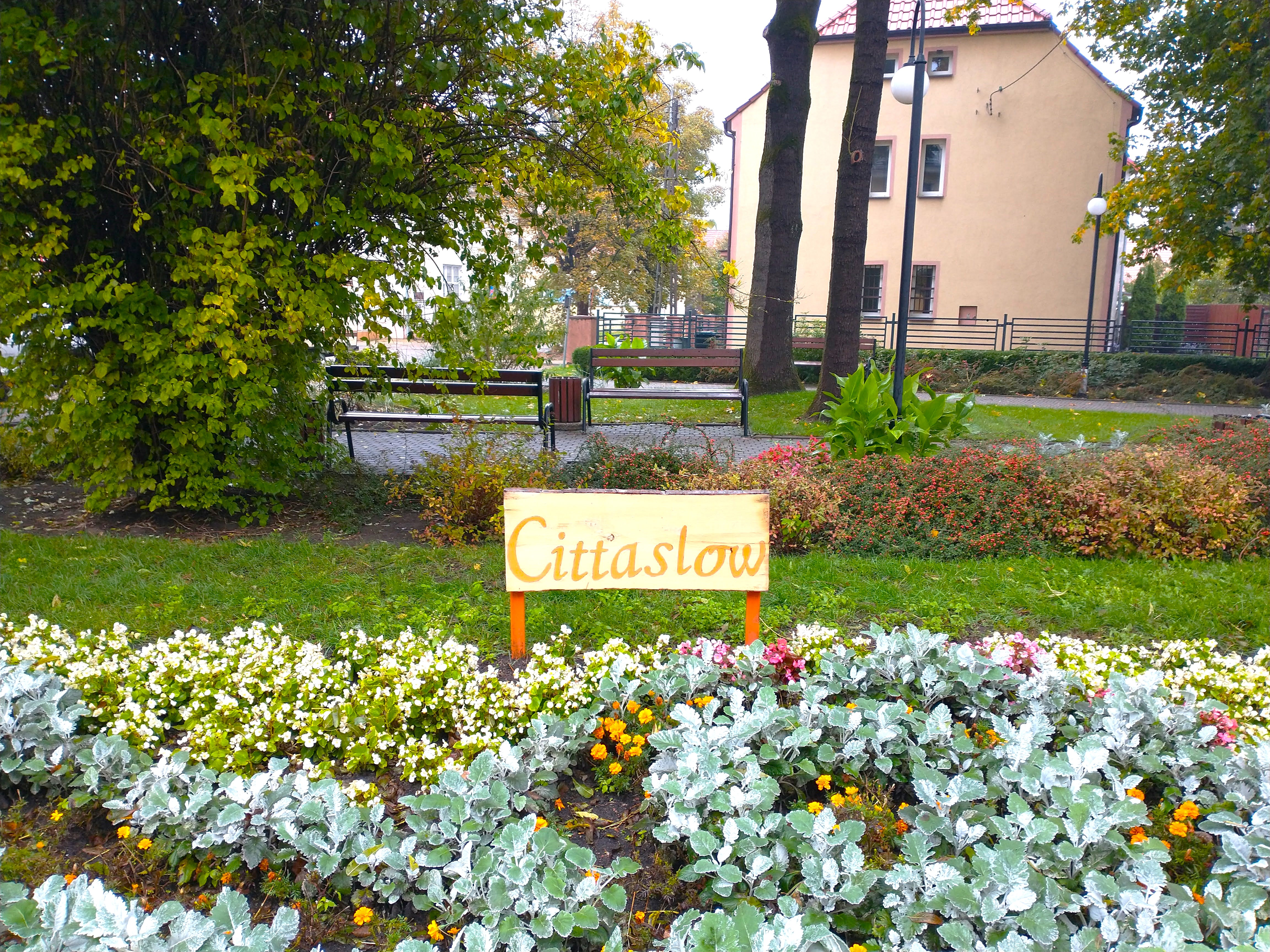
Cittaslow sign in Orneta, Poland

There are three categories of membership: Cittaslow town (population less than 50,000); Cittaslow Supporter (population more than 50,000); and Cittaslow Friend (individual or family).

Like Slow Food, Cittaslow is a membership organisation. Full membership of Cittaslow is only open to towns with a population under 50,000. To become eligible for membership, a town must normally score at least 50 percent in a self-assessment process against the set of Cittaslow goals, and then apply for admission to the appropriate Cittaslow national network. An annual membership fee is payable by towns.

The first town in England to become a Cittaslow city (and the first in the English-speaking world) was Ludlow in November 2003; the first in Wales was Mold. There are currently three towns in the UK that are members.

Pijao, a small town in Colombia, is to become the first Cittaslow city in Latin America.

Polish Cittaslow towns participate in the annual Cittaslow Towns Festival, hosted each year by a different member town in Poland. The first festival took place in 2010 in Reszel.

Some localitites withdrew from the organization, including Diss, UK, Fairfax, California, US, Ludlow, UK, Perth, UK, Taraklı, Turkey, and Wydminy, Poland.

== Members ==
Country	Slow Cities	Number
Australia	Goolwa, Katoomba, Yea	3
Austria	Enns, Hartberg, Horn	3
Belgium	Beauvechain, Chaudfontaine, Damme, Enghien, Estinnes, Jurbise, Lens, Maaseik, Silly	9
Brazil	Socorro	1
Canada	Cowichan Bay, Lac-Megantic, Naramata, Wolfville	4
China	Changjia, Dongying, Erdaobaihe, Fuli, Jingyang, Longbo, Longhe, Luzhi, Nan'ao, Shimenshan, Songbai, Yanyang, Yaxi, Yingpan, Yuhu, Yunping	16
Colombia	Guacamayas, Marulanda, Pijao	3
Croatia	Bale, Makarska, Samobor	3
Denmark	Mariagerfjord, Svendborg	2
Finland	Kristinestad	1
France	Cazaubon, Creon, Labastide-d'Armagnac, Labouheyre, Le Haillan, Lectoure, Loix, Mirande, Saint-Antonin-Noble-Val, Samatan, Segonzac, Simorre, Valmondois	13
Germany	Bad Essen, Bad Schussenried, Bad Wimpfen, Berching, Bischofsheim, Blieskastel, Deidesheim, Hersbruck, Homberg (Efze), Lüdinghausen, Maikammer, Meldorf, Michelstadt, Nördlingen, Penzlin, Schneverdingen, Schwetzingen, Selfkant, Spalt, Stollberg, Überlingen, Waldkirch, Wirsberg, Zwingenberg	24
Hungary	Hódmezővásárhely	1
Iceland	Djúpivogur	1
Ireland	Clonakilty	1
Italy	Abbiategrasso, Acqualagna, Acquapendente, Altomonte, Amalfi, Amelia, Anghiari, Asolo, Baiso, Barga, Bellano, Borgo Val di Taro, Bra, Brisighella, Caiazzo, Capalbio, Casalbeltrame, Castel Campagnano, Castel San Pietro Romano, Castel San Pietro Terme, Castelnovo ne' Monti, Castelnuovo Berardenga, Castiglione in Teverina, Castiglione Olona, Cerreto Sannita, Chiavenna, Chiaverano, Cisternino, Città della Pieve, Città Sant'Angelo, Civitella in Val di Chiana, Controguerra, Cortona, Cutigliano, Farra di Soligo, Ficulle, Fiumefreddo Bruzio, Follina, Fontanellato, Francavilla al Mare, Galeata, Gioi, Giuliano Teatino, Gravina in Puglia, Greve in Chianti, Grumes, Guardiagrele, Levanto, Marradi, Massa Marittima, Monte Castello di Vibio, Montefalco, Morimondo, Mulazzo, Nicolosi, Norcia, Novellara, Orsara di Puglia, Orvieto, Parrano, Pellegrino Parmense, Penne, Perito, Pianella, Pineto, Pollica, Positano, Pratovecchio Stia, Preci, Ribera, Salorno, San Miniato, San Vincenzo, Sant'Agata di Puglia, Santa Sofia, Santarcangelo di Romagna, Sperlonga, Stio, Suvereto, Teglio, Tirano, Todi, Tolfa, Trani, Travacò Siccomario, Trevi, Turbigo, Usseglio, Zibello	90
Japan	Kesennuma, Maebashi-Akagi	2
Luxembourg	Clervaux	1
Netherlands	Alphen-Chaam, Borger-Odoorn, Echt-Susteren, Eijsden-Margraten, Gulpen-Wittem, Heerde, Midden-Delfland, Peel en Maas, Vaals, Westerwolde	10
New Zealand	Matakana	1
Northern Cyprus	Geçitkale, Lefka, Mehmetçik, Tatlısu, Yeniboğaziçi	5
Norway	Sokndal, Ulvik	2
Poland	Barczewo, Bartoszyce, Biała Piska, Biskupiec, Bisztynek, Braniewo, Dobre Miasto, Działdowo, Głubczyce, Golub-Dobrzyń, Gołdap, Górowo Iławeckie, Jeziorany, Kalety, Kisielice, Lidzbark, Lidzbark Warmiński, Lubawa, Morąg, Murowana Goślina, Nidzica, Nowe Miasto Lubawskie, Nowy Dwór Gdański, Olecko, Olsztynek, Orneta, Pasym, Prudnik, Rejowiec Fabryczny, Reszel, Ryn, Rzgów, Sępopol, Sianów, Sierpc, Szczytno, Węgorzewo	37
Portugal	São Brás de Alportel, Silves, Tavira, Viana do Castelo	4
Russia	Svetlogorsk	1
South Africa	Sedgefield	1
South Korea	Cheongsong County (Pacheon-myeon), Damyang County (Changpyeong-myeon), Hadong County (Akyang-myeon), Jecheon (Susan-myeon & Bakdaljae), Jeonju (Jeonju Hanok Village), Namyangju (Joan-myeon), Sangju (Hamchang-eup, Gonggeom-myeon, Ian-myeon), Shinan County (Jeung-do island), Wando County (Cheongsando Island), Yeongwol County (Kimsatgat-myeon), Yesan County (Daeheung & Eungbong-myeon)	11
Spain	Artà, Balmaseda, Begues, Begur, Benabarre, Bubión, Lekeitio, Mungia, Pals, Rubielos de Mora, Valle de la Orotava	11
Sweden	Falköping	1
Taiwan	Chihshang, Dalin, Dongyin, Fonglin, Maolin, Nanzhuang, Sanyi, Zhutian	8
Turkey	Ahlat, Akyaka, Arapgir, Çameli, Daday, Demre, Eğirdir, Finike, Foça, Gerze, Gökçeada, Göynük, Güdül, Halfeti, İbradı, İznik, Kemaliye, Köyceğiz, Mudurnu, Perşembe, Safranbolu, Seferihisar, Şarköy, Şavşat, Uzundere, Vize, Yalvaç, Yenipazar	28
United Kingdom	Aylsham, Llangollen, Mold	3
United States	Sebastopol CA, Sonoma CA	2

== The goals and aims ==
There are 50 goals and principles that each Cittaslow town commits to work to achieve. They serve as benchmarks to improve the quality of life in each city.

The main aims of the movement are:

- making life better for everyone living in an urban environment
- improving the quality of life in the cities
- resisting the homogenization and globalization of towns around the globe
- protecting the environment
- promoting cultural diversity and uniqueness of individual cities
- providing inspiration for a healthier lifestyle

== See also ==
- Slow food
- Slow architecture
- Slow Photography
- Carlo Petrini
