= Tax Credit Assistance Program =

US housing grant program

The Tax Credit Assistance Program (TCAP) is a Federal housing grant program administered by HUD which assists Low Income Housing Tax Credit (LIHTC) projects funded during 2007, 2008 and 2009. The TCAP program is part of the American Recovery and Reinvestment Act which was signed by President Obama on February 17, 2009. The program is designed to assist troubled LIHTC deals struggling to find a tax credit investor.

As a result of the faltering economy and financial markets, the value of Low Income Housing Tax Credits plummeted in 2008 and continued to decline during 2009. Most LIHTC deals struggle to find investors. The TCAP program provides supplemental grant funds to make the project feasible.

Administration of the TCAP funds at the Federal level occurs at HUD. HUD then delegates administration of the program on the state level to the designated housing finance agency charged with administering the LIHTC program. HUD established the basic requirements of the program and the state housing finance agencies established more specific qualification and award criteria.

State	TCAP $
Alaska	$5,490,631
Alabama	$31,952,086
Arkansas	$20,463,053
Arizona	$32,308,066
California	$325,877,114
Colorado	$27,349,670
Connecticut	$26,170,888
District Of Columbia	$11,644,346
Delaware	$6,608,893
Florida	$101,134,952
Georgia	$54,481,680
Hawaii	$9,861,610
Iowa	$18,978,542
Idaho	$8,753,622
Illinois	$94,676,979
Indiana	$38,048,333
Kansas	$17,121,110
Kentucky	$31,616,176
Louisiana	$39,383,397
Massachusetts	$59,605,630
Maryland	$31,701,696
Maine	$10,690,750
Michigan	$63,974,711
Minnesota	$28,434,123
Missouri	$38,687,026
Mississippi	$21,881,803
Montana	$7,818,360
North Carolina	$52,152,687
North Dakota	$4,860,574
Nebraska	$11,380,566
New Hampshire	$8,269,787
New Jersey	$61,243,670
New Mexico	$13,876,558
Nevada	$15,184,795
New York	$252,659,616
Ohio	$83,484,547
Oklahoma	$25,723,568
Oregon	$27,343,971
Pennsylvania	$95,050,396
Puerto Rico	$42,646,082
Rhode Island	$11,933,403
South Carolina	$25,384,973
South Dakota	$5,405,055
Tennessee	$39,032,515
Texas	$148,354,769
Utah	$11,639,074
Virginia	$44,247,749
Vermont	$5,416,546
Washington	$43,010,192
Wisconsin	$35,594,904
West Virginia	$16,541,848
Wyoming	$4,846,908
Total	$2,250,000,000
Source: HUD

== See also ==
- Tax Credit Assistance Program (TCAP), Official HUD TCAP Page
- "HUD Issues Tax Credit Assistance Program (TCAP) guidance", Nixon Peabody, May 5, 2009
