= Slow architecture =

Type of architecture

Slow architecture is a term believed to have grown from the slow food movement of the mid-1980s. Slow architecture is generally architecture that is created gradually and organically, as opposed to building it quickly for short-term goals. It is often combined with an ecological, environmentally sustainable approach.

Slow architecture could also be interpreted literally to mean architecture that has taken a very long time to build, for example the Sagrada Família, in Barcelona.

When Eduardo Souto de Moura won the 2011 Pritzker Prize, a jury member described his buildings as slow architecture, because it required careful consideration to appreciate its intricacies. Professor Kenneth Frampton said "Souto de Moura's work is sort of more grounded in a way... They have their character coming from the way in which they have been developed as structures." 2012 Pritzker winner Wang Shu was described as "China's champion of Slow architecture".

== Slow architecture examples ==
=== Canada ===
Professor John Brown of the University of Calgary has launched a not-for-profit website designed to promote "slow homes". This follows ten years of research. A slow home is described as attractive, in harmony with the neighbourhood, and energy efficient, using a smaller carbon footprint.

=== China ===
Pritzker Prize winning architect Wang Shu has been described as "China's champion of Slow architecture". His buildings evoke the densely packed architecture of China's older cities, with intimate courtyards, tilting walls and a variety of sloping roofs. "Cities today have become far too large. I’m really worried, because it’s happening too fast and we have already lost so much" he says.

=== Ireland ===
The slow architecture project in Ireland launched a touring exhibition by canal boat in 2010. The boat travelled between seven locations over a six-week period, with artists and architects holding workshops and lectures at each stopping point.

=== United States ===
In 2008, architects from leading US practices took part in a San Francisco-based project called Slow Food Nation. They created constructions that were generally food-related and ecologically motivated, including a variety of pavilions, a water station made from recycled bottles, a compost exhibit and a "soapbox" for farmers.

== See also ==
- Slow movement (culture)
- Slow Food
- Cittaslow (Slow Cities)
- Slow photography
