= Regulatory Barriers Clearinghouse =

The Regulatory Barriers Clearinghouse (RBC) collects, processes, assembles, and disseminates information on existing barriers that inhibit the production and conservation of affordable housing. RBC is part of the U.S. Department of Housing and Urban Development's (HUD's) Office of Policy Development and Research (PD&R) overall effort to help create cohesive, economically viable, and healthy communities. It was created as part of the Removal of Regulatory Barriers to Affordable Housing Act of 1992, and also as part of the Housing and Community Development Act of 1992.

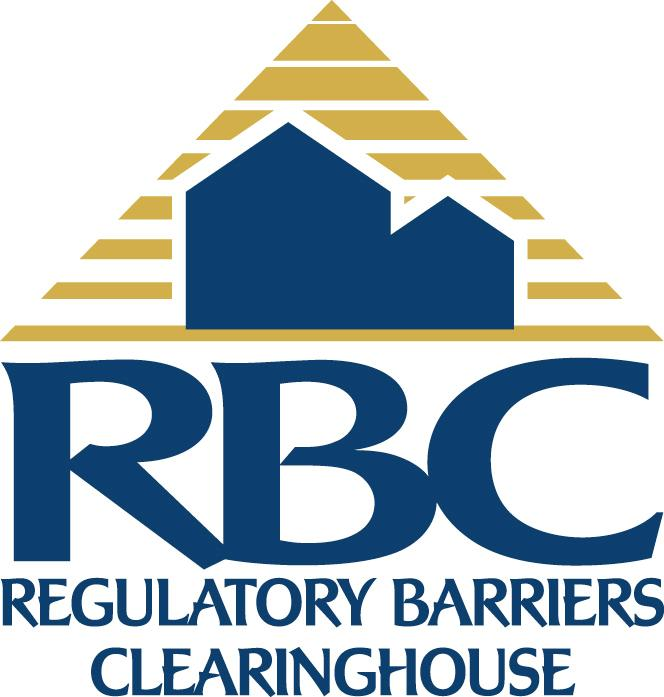
RBC Logo

== RBC's Services ==
RBC maintains a searchable online database, which categorizes actual state and local regulatory reform strategies that support affordable housing. The database now contains over 4,000 barriers and proposed solutions. Database entries are divided into the following 10 categories: administrative processes, building and housing codes, fair housing and neighborhood deconcentration, fees and dedications, planning and growth restrictions, redevelopment/infill, rent controls, state/local environment and historic rules, tax policies, and zoning and land development.

RBC’s webpage hosts a This Just In section that highlights a variety of useful and interesting database entries, and the Strategy of the Month Club, a bimonthly listserv that features new and innovative approaches to overcoming regulatory barriers.

RBC also staffs a toll-free phone line, Monday through Friday, from 8:30 a.m. to 5:15 p.m, Eastern Time, along with email support.

== Publications ==
The Clearinghouse publishes a free bimonthly e-newsletter, Breakthroughs, which contains successful strategies for overcoming regulatory barriers to affordable housing. Breakthroughs articles are submitted by the public, or are the result of interesting developments throughout the housing industry.

== See also ==
- HUD USER
- U.S. Department of Housing and Urban Development
- Visitability – Social Integration Beyond Independent Living
- Prefabricated Home
