= HUD User =

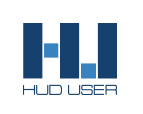
- Website type: "hosts research, publications, and datasets in housing, community development, and more."
- Available in: English
- Owners: US Department of Housing and Urban Development's Office of Policy Development and Research (PD&R)
- Website: www.huduser.gov/portal/home.html

HUD USER is an information source containing reports and reference documents for the U.S. Department of Housing and Urban Development (HUD). HUD USER was established by the HUD's Office of Policy Development and Research (PD&R) in 1978.

== Background ==
HUD USER contains over 800 documents, comprising a variety of reference material for researchers and policy makers. In addition to published works, HUD User hosts data sets and a bibliographic database. Most of the material can be downloaded for free or purchased in print-form.

== Periodicals ==
HUD USER publishes at regular intervals, the Research Works newsletter, the Breakthrough e-newsletter, the tri-quarterly Cityscape journal and a quarterly report on U.S. housing market conditions.

== Data sets ==
HUD USER provides researchers with access to the original data sets generated by PD&R-sponsored data collection efforts. These data sets include the American Housing Survey, HUD median family income limits, microdata from research initiatives, the HUD-insured multifamily housing stock, and the public housing population.

== Additional sections ==
In addition to the resources noted above, the HUD USER also hosts smaller, content-specific sections, including specialized clearing houses, housing, and community developments. HUD USER also hosts a case studies section highlighting development projects.
