= Jiangning (disambiguation) =

- Traditional Chinese: 江寧
- Simplified Chinese: 江宁
Transcriptions
Standard Mandarin
- Hanyu Pinyin: Jiāngníng

Jiangning was an old name of Nanjing, China.

Jiangning may also refer to:

- Jiangning District, a district in Nanjing
  - Jiangning Subdistrict, a subdistrict in Jiangning District
- Jiangning Prefecture, a historical prefecture centered in Nanjing
- Jiangning Town, a town in Bobai County, Guangxi, China

== See also ==
- Jiang Ning (born 1986), Chinese footballer
- Jiangning Road Subdistrict, a subdistrict in Shanghai, China
