= Yangshan =

Yangshan could refer to the following places in China:

- Yangshan Port (洋山港), part of Port of Shanghai
- Yangshan Park Station (羊山公园站), a station on the Line No. 2 of the Nanjing Metro, opened on 28 May 2010
- Yangshan County (阳山县), in Guangdong
- Yangshan Town
  - Yangshan, Chaoyang County (羊山镇), in Liaoning
  - Yangshan, Jinxiang County (羊山镇), in Shandong
  - Yangshan, Wuxi (阳山镇), in Huishan District, Wuxi, Jiangsu
  - Yangshan, Shengsi County (洋山镇), in Shengsi County, Zhoushan, Zhejiang
- Yangshan Township
  - Yangshan Township, Wuwei County (羊山乡), in Wuwei County, Anhui
  - Yangshan Township, Wencheng County (仰山乡), in Wencheng County, Zhejiang
- Yangshan Quarry (阳山碑材), an ancient stone quarry near Nanjing
