= Niushoushan =

Buddhist cultural park in Nanjing, China

- 牛首山
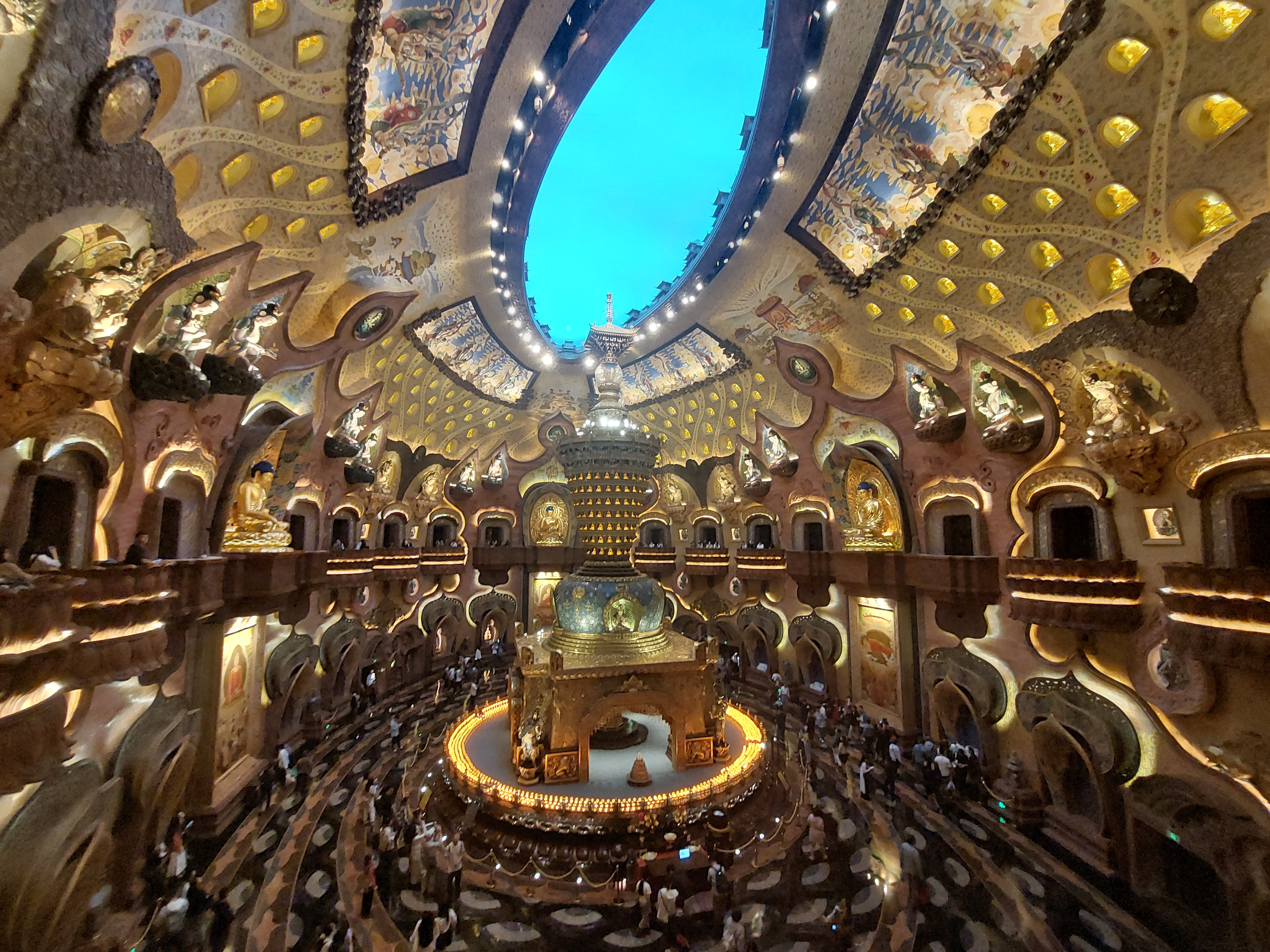
- Inside the Great Usnisa Hall at Niushoushan
- Interactive map of Niushoushan
- Type: Buddhist cultural park
- Location: Dongshanqiao Town, Jiangning District, China
- Nearest city: Nanjing
- Nearest town: Dongshanqiao Town
- Coordinates: 31.91322°N 118.74507°E
- Area: 80 ha (Phase One: 17.5 ha)
- Opened: 2014
- Operator: Nanjing Niushoushan Culture Tourism Development
- Visitors: 5 million (3 years after opening)
- Status: Open
- Budget: 4 billion RMB
- Website: eng.niushoushan.net

Niushou Mountain, or Niushoushan, located in Jiangning District of Nanjing City, Jiangsu Province, China, is a low hill belonging to the southern branch of the western Ningzhen Hills. Its main peak stands at an elevation of 242.9 meters.

The mountain name literally means the "Ox Head Mountain" because the east and west peaks form the shape of two horns of an ox). The mountain derives its name from its twin peaks, which resemble the horns of an ox.It is also known as Tianque Mountain and is referred to as Niutou Mountain by locals.

The park is newly developed and opened as a tourist attraction in 2014, but the location has been a Buddhist site since the Tang dynasty (618–907AD). However, the original temple was destroyed in the 1850s during the Taiping Rebellion.

Since 2015, the palace has been the shrine for the world's only parietal relic of Buddha (the skull of Shakyamuni), making Niushoushan a sacred location for Buddhists. The relic was found in the Ashoka Pagoda in the underground palace of the Bao'en Temple (the former Changgan Temple of the Song dynasty) in Qinhuai District, Nanjing.

== History ==
=== Year 317 ===
Emperor Yuan of Jin, Sima Rui, crossed the Yangtze River and established the Eastern Jin Dynasty with its capital in Jiankang (modern-day Nanjing). He planned to construct a pair of ceremonial towers outside the southern gate, Xuanyang Gate (now Zhonghua Gate), as a symbol of imperial supremacy. However, Prime Minister Wang Dao, understanding the fledgling nature of the dynasty, advised against large-scale construction projects. Instead, he invited Emperor Yuan to gaze southward from Xuanyang Gate toward Niushou Mountain, where the two peaks stood majestically opposite each other. Taking advantage of the moment, Wang Dao persuaded the emperor, saying, "These are Heaven's Towers; why trouble to build new ones?" The emperor happily abandoned the construction plans and proclaimed Niushou Mountain as "Heaven's Towers."

=== Year 459 ===
In the 3rd year of the Daming era of the Liu Song dynasty in the Southern Dynasties, Youqi Temple was established. It became one of the most prominent early temples among the "480 Temples of the Southern Dynasties."

=== Year 461 ===
In the 5th year of the Daming era of Emperor Xiaowu of Liu Song, the monk Pizhi lived in a cave on the southern slope of the western peak of Niushou Mountain. According to legend, he "achieved enlightenment and ascended to immortality" in this cave. Hence, the cave became known as Pizhi Buddha Cave or Buddha Grotto Cave, and Niushou Mountain was briefly referred to as Xian Ku Mountain ("Immortal Grotto Mountain").

=== Year 503 ===
In the 2nd year of the Tianjian era of the Liang dynasty, Sima Xu Du established the initial Buddha Grotto Temple (now Hongjue Temple) on the southern side of Niushou Mountain.

=== Year 643 ===
In the 17th year of the Zhenguan era of the Tang Dynasty, Dharma Master Farong, praised as the "Bodhidharma of the Eastern Summer," founded a meditation chamber in the northern rock of Youqi Temple. Following the teachings of the Fourth Patriarch Daoxin of Chan Buddhism, he established the Niu Tou Chan School. This marked the true Sinicization of Indian Chan Buddhism, making Niushou Mountain a significant origin of Chinese Chan Buddhismgs to disciples.

=== Year 943 ===
The burial sites of Li Bian, the first emperor of the Southern Tang, and his empress Song, known as "Qinling," as well as the burial sites of Li Jing, the second emperor, and his empress Zhong, known as "Shunling," are collectively referred to as the Two Mausoleums of the Southern Tangzh：南唐二陵. Located on the southern slopes of Niushou Mountain, they are the largest imperial tombs of the Five Dynasties and Ten Kingdoms period and are now designated as national key cultural heritage sites.

=== Years 1436–1449 ===
In the 8th year of the Xuande era of the Ming Dynasty, the renowned navigator Zheng He died on the west coast of India in Calicut and was granted burial at Niushou Mountain in Nanjing.

During the Zhengtong era of the Ming Dynasty, Buddha Grotto Temple was renamed Hongjue Temple. It became one of the prominent Buddhist temples in Nanjing, subordinate to the Grand Bao'en Temple, and was among the eight great imperial temples of Ming Dynasty Nanjing.

=== Year 2010 ===
After research and approval by religious and cultural authorities, as well as the Buddhist and cultural heritage communities, plans were finalized to construct an underground palace at the Niushou Mountain Heritage Park to enshrine the Buddha's parietal bone relic.

=== October 27, 2015 ===
The grand ceremony to enshrine the Buddha's parietal bone relic (舍利) of Shakyamuni Buddha was held at Niushou Mountain in Nanjing. The Niushou Mountain Cultural Tourism Zone was simultaneously completed and officially opened to the public.

== Attractions ==
Niushou Mountain is renowned for its breathtaking natural scenery, often praised as "Springtime Niushou." Rich in history and culture, it is a site of great significance: the location of Yue Fei's resistance against the Jin dynasty and the final resting place of Zheng He. It is also the birthplace and foundational site of the Niu Tou Chan School, an important lineage of Chinese Chan Buddhism with a profound spiritual legacy.

As one of Nanjing's major cultural projects during the 12th Five-Year Plan period, the Niushou Mountain Cultural Tourism Zone was developed around the theme of "permanently enshrining the world's most sacred Buddhist relic—the Buddha's parietal bone." The project is positioned as "a new global Buddhist cultural heritage site and a contemporary architectural marvel." By integrating ecological, cultural, and tourism resources, the zone aims to create three distinctive realms: ecology, culture, and leisure.

Key landmarks and attractions at Niushou Mountain include:

=== Fortifications for Battle against Jin Wuzhu ===
In April of the 4th year of Jianyan Period in Southern Song Dynasty, Jin Wuzhu led an army and approached Jiankang（present Nanjing. Yue Fei ambushed his troops around Niushou Mountain and built a base, thus Jin Wu Wuzhu was defeated. The Fortifications for Battle against Jin Wuzhu is the fence built with russet stones when Yuefei's troops battled with Jin Wuzhu's. The fence was 0.5 meters wide at the bottom of the wall and 1.5 meters long, winding and well arranged through high and low walls.

According to History of Song: Yue Fei zh：《宋史•岳飞传》, "Jin Wuzhu led his army approaching Jiankang; then Yue Fei ambushed his troops around Niushou Mountain and waited for his troops; Yue ordered about 100 soldiers with black clothes to sneak into Jin's troops and attacked. Jin's troops were in great panic and attacked themselves". This was the famous battle: Niushou Mountain Campaign. A section of 200-meter site built with stones still remained, which is rare because it has been 860 years since Yuefei's battle against Jin Wuzhu happened.

=== Foding Palace ===
Foding Palace is an underground architectural complex built to enshrine the Buddha's parietal bone relic. It measures 220 meters in length, 160 meters in width, and has a total height of 89.3 meters, with a building area of approximately 136,000 square meters. The above-ground section consists of a large and a small dome, with the large dome measuring 220 meters along its major axis and 130 meters along its minor axis. Its highest point rises 52 meters above Foding Square.

The lower section features a lotus throne composed of 56 Flying Apsara Bodhi gates and 56 cloud-patterned ruyi columns.

Foding Palace was constructed within an abandoned mining pit. Between 1937 and 1958, large-scale iron mining caused severe damage to the western peak of Niushou Mountain, leaving a pit over 60 meters deep, while the eastern peak remained intact.

=== Zen Realm Grand View ===
The Zen Realm Grand View is located in the above-ground section of Foding Palace. It is oval-shaped, measuring 112 meters in length from north to south and 62 meters in width from east to west, with a total height of 46.5 meters and a space area exceeding 6,000 square meters. Its centerpiece features a jade reclining Buddha.

=== Thousand Buddha Hall ===
The Thousand Buddha Hall stands 28 meters tall and houses 1,343 statues of Buddhas and Bodhisattvas. Its layout is inspired by the Tang Dynasty Vajradhatu Mandala, depicting a sacred scene of Buddhas and Bodhisattvas offering blessings to each other.

=== Ten Thousand Buddha Corridor ===
Encircling the Thousand Buddha Hall is the Ten Thousand Buddha Corridor, a circular gallery with two levels. Each level consists of numerous walls with Thousand Buddha niches and various murals. The corridor's design centers on the twelve zodiac signs and their associated guardian Buddhas, with each statue showcasing unique hand gestures. The corridor also features porcelain panels illustrating the Buddha's life stories, lacquered sculptures of the Sixteen Bodhisattvas of the Auspicious Eon, and colorful caisson paintings.

=== Foding Tower ===
Adjacent to Foding Palace stands Foding Tower and the Ming Dynasty Hongjue Temple Pagoda. Foding Tower is 88 meters tall, covering an area of 4,677 square meters, with nine levels and four facades, designed in the Tang architectural style.

On the eighth floor, a bronze-cast Foding Vajra Bell is inscribed with the full text of the Diamond Sutra, written by Master Longxiang. The ninth floor houses the Tathagata Hall, which enshrines a statue of Vairocana Buddha.

=== Zheng He Cultural Park ===
The Zheng He Cultural Park is the burial site of Zheng He. The original tomb was rectangular, oriented north-south, measuring approximately 150 meters in length, 60 meters in width, and 8 meters in height. The tomb, restored in 1985, retains traditional Hui and Muslim burial customs. It features a horseshoe-shaped stone mausoleum made of bluestone, with a tomb cover carved with yunjin and lotus patterns, along with Arabic inscriptions. A stone tablet embedded in the rear wall bears the inscription "Tomb of Zheng He" in carved clerical script.

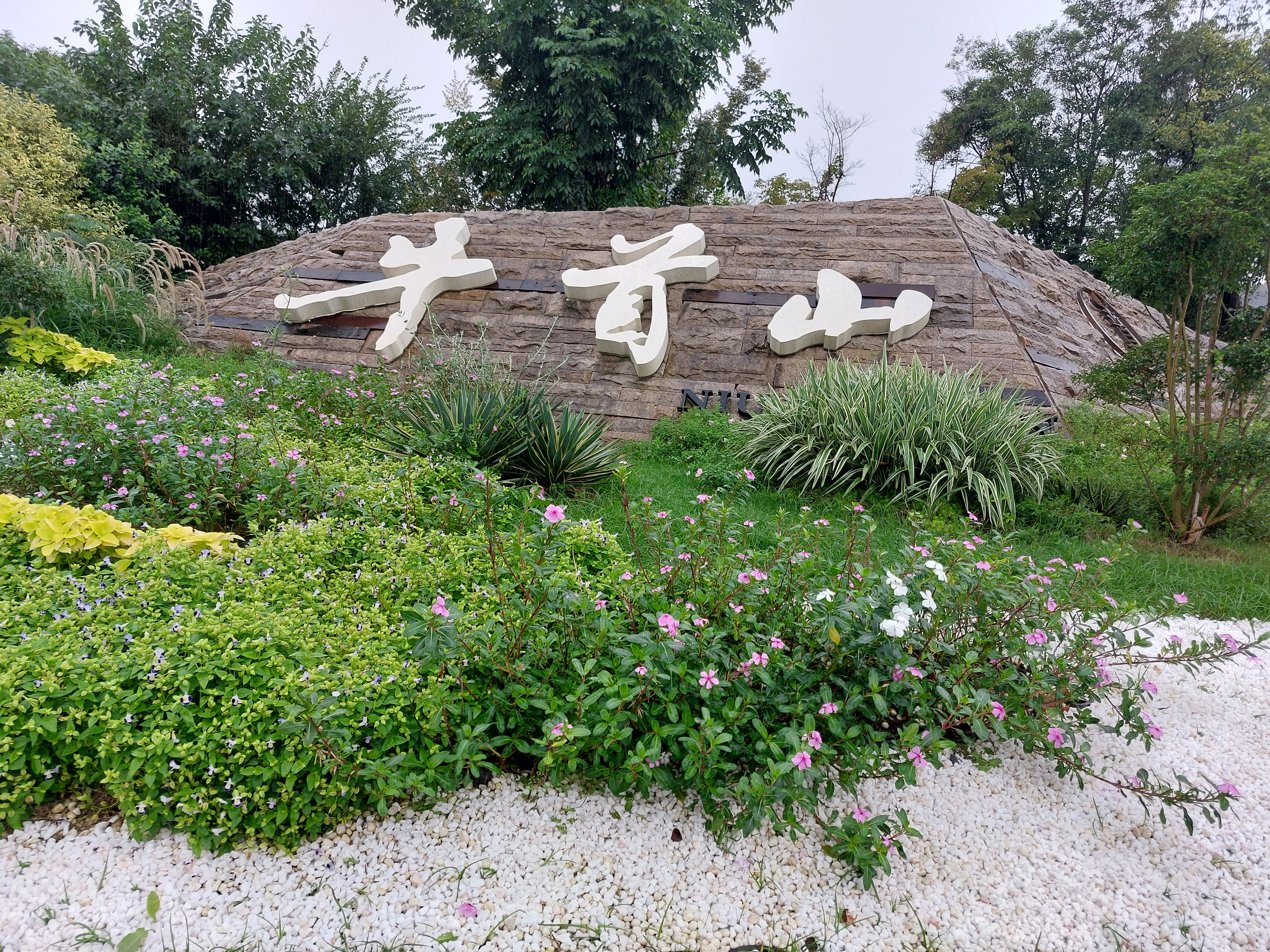
Sign at the main east entrance to the Niushoushan Cultural Park

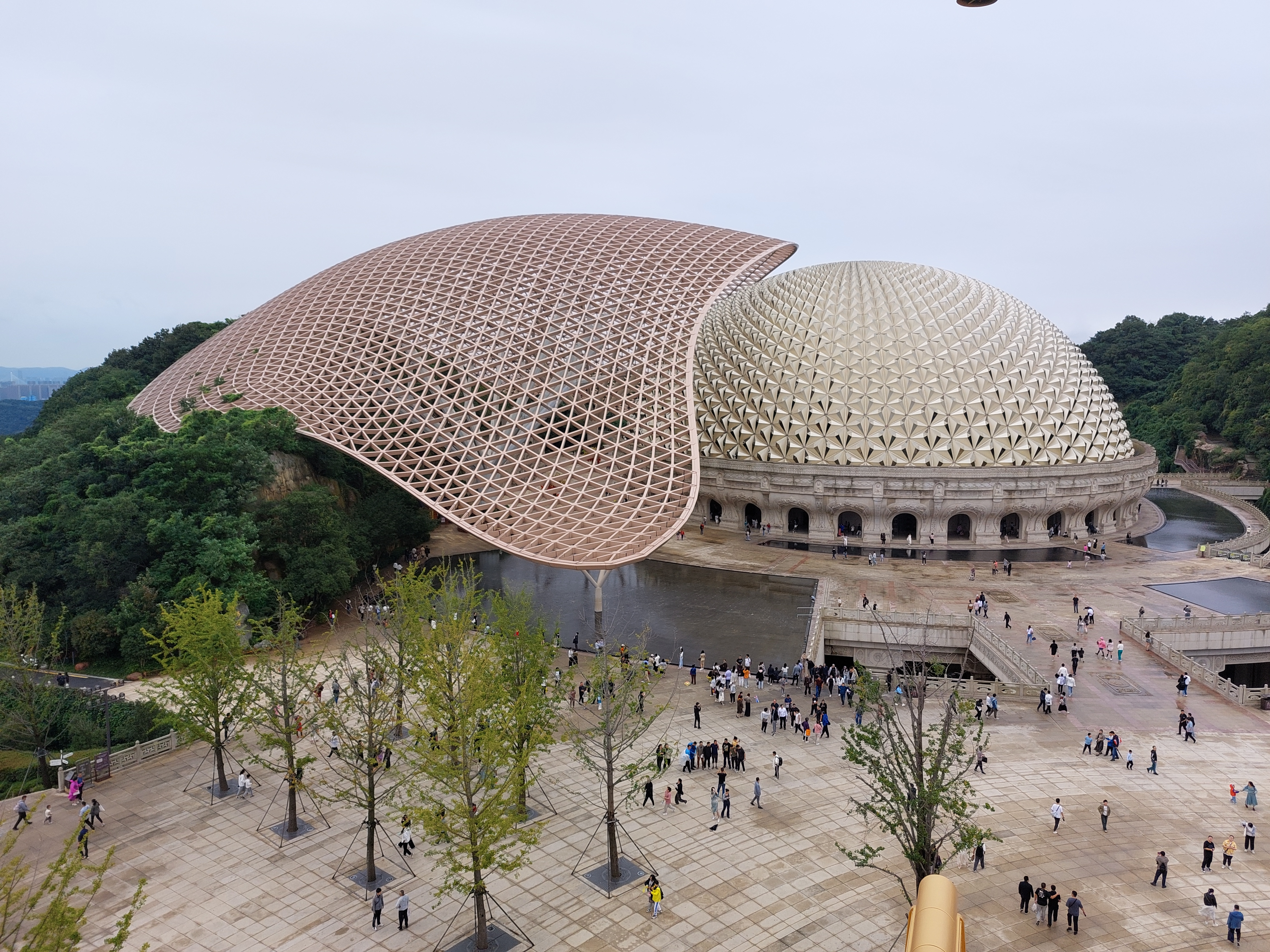
View of the Foding Palace domes from the Foding Pagoda

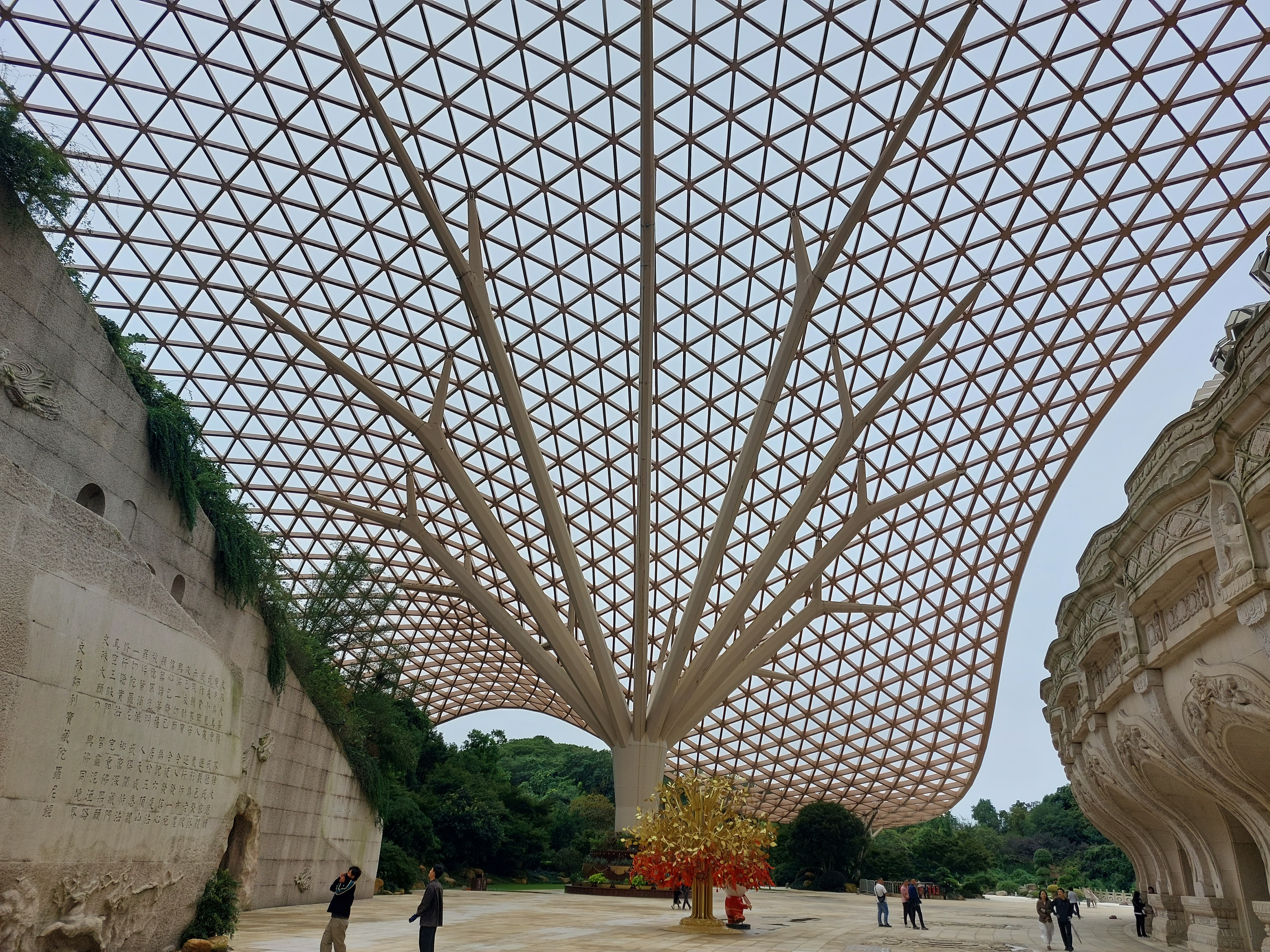
View under the large dome by the palace

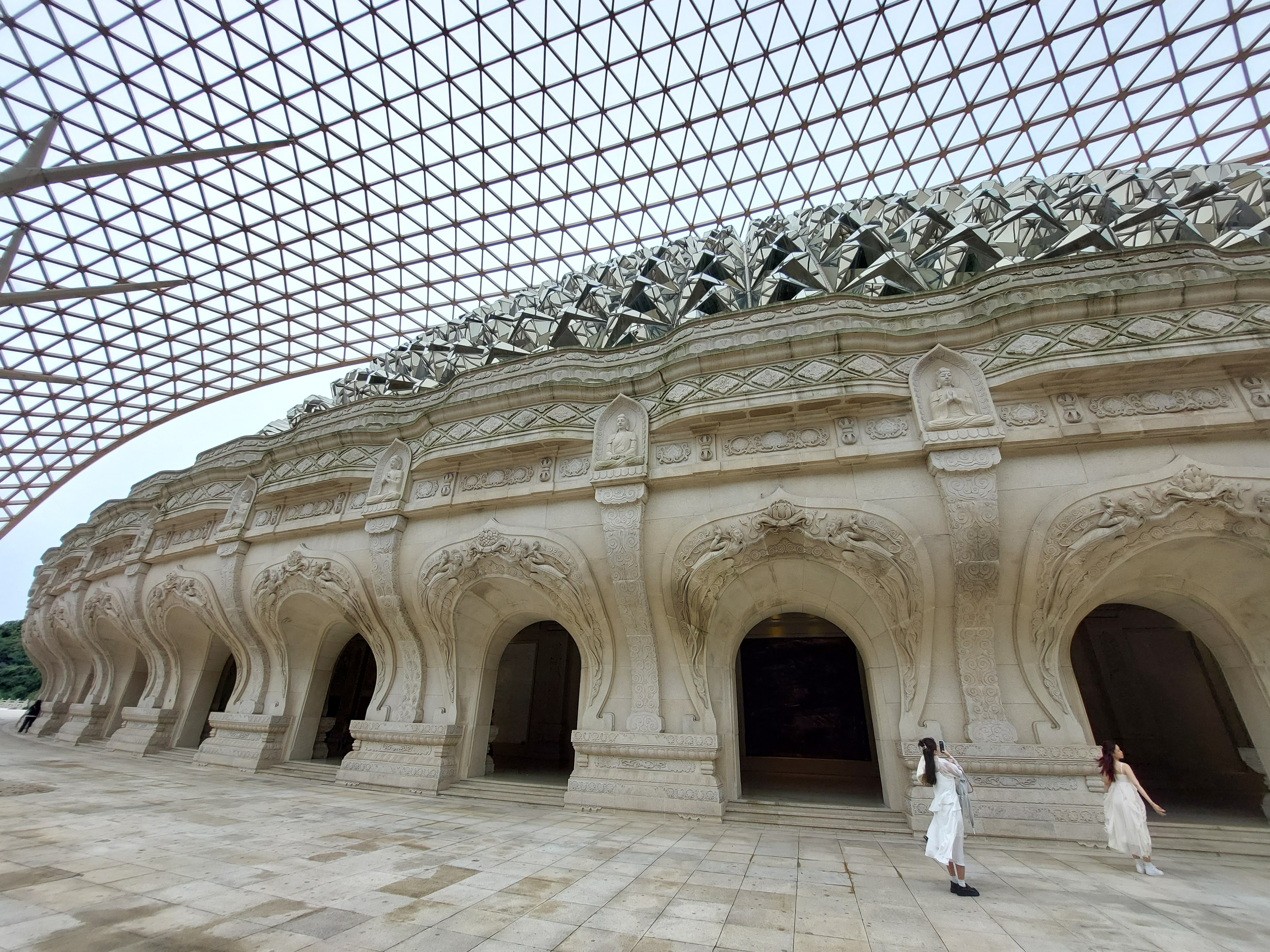
Gates into the Foding Palace

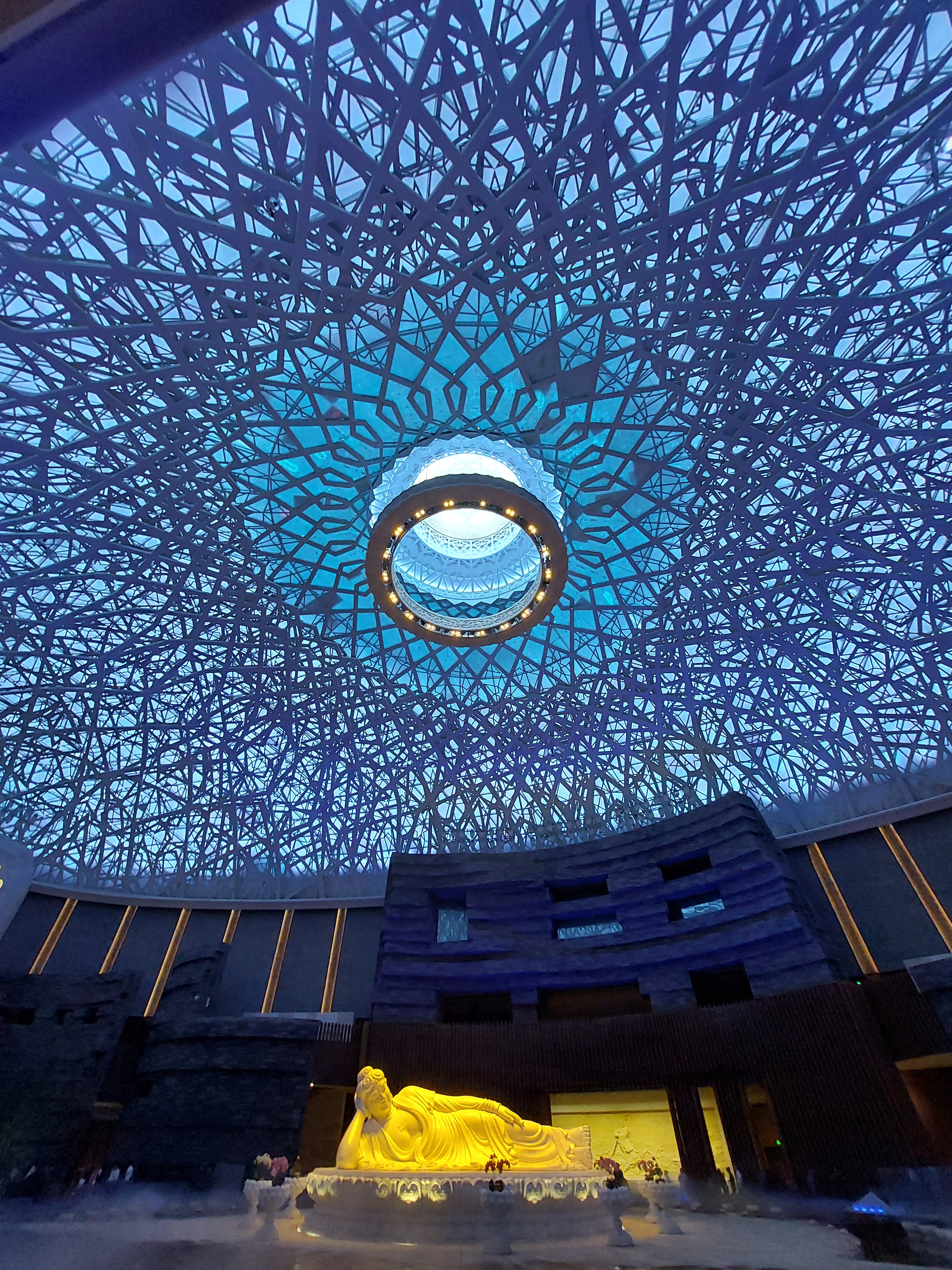
The dome in the Foding Palace

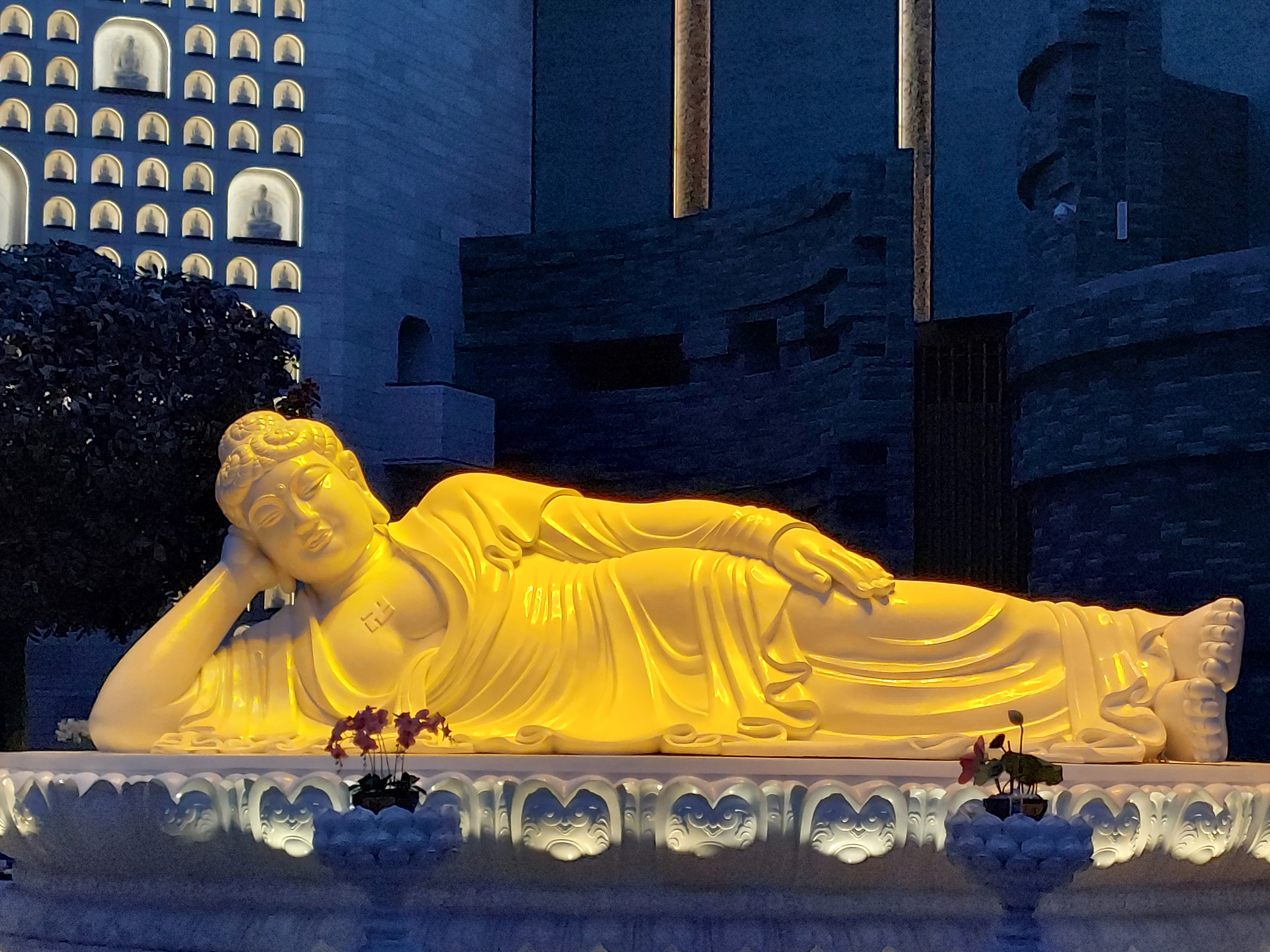
The reclining Buddha

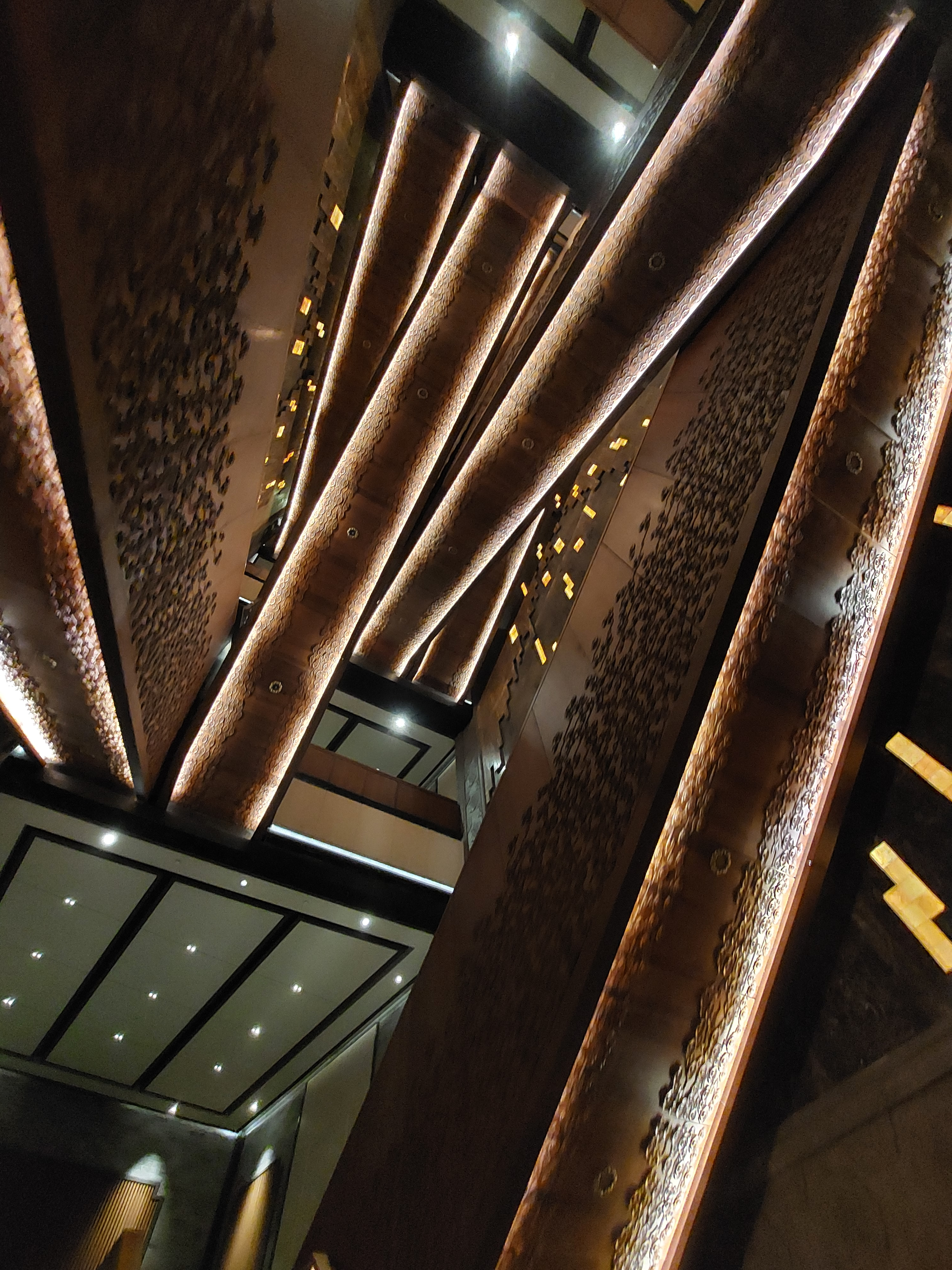
Escalators to the Great Usnisa Hall

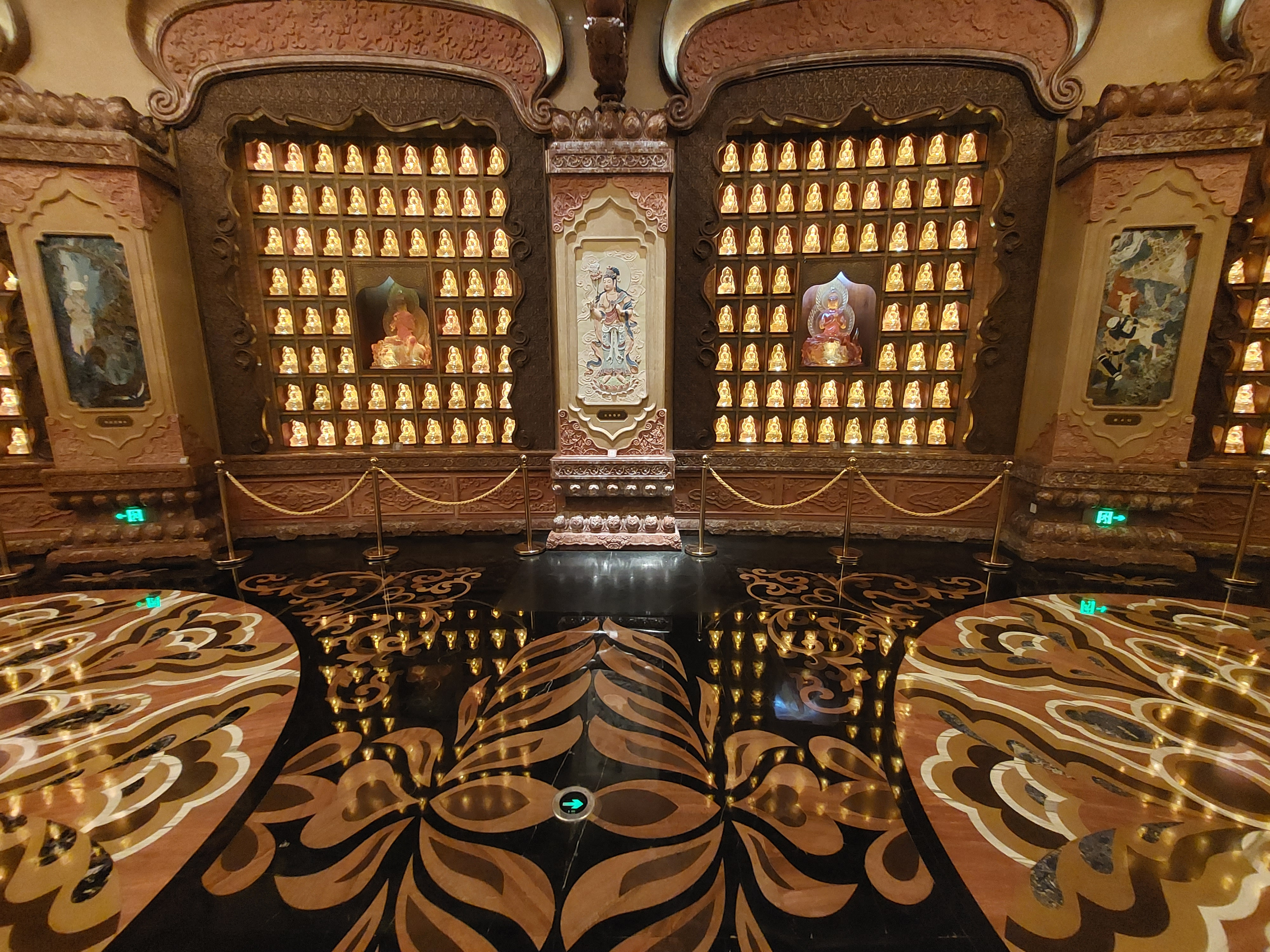
Corridor outside the Great Usnisa Hall

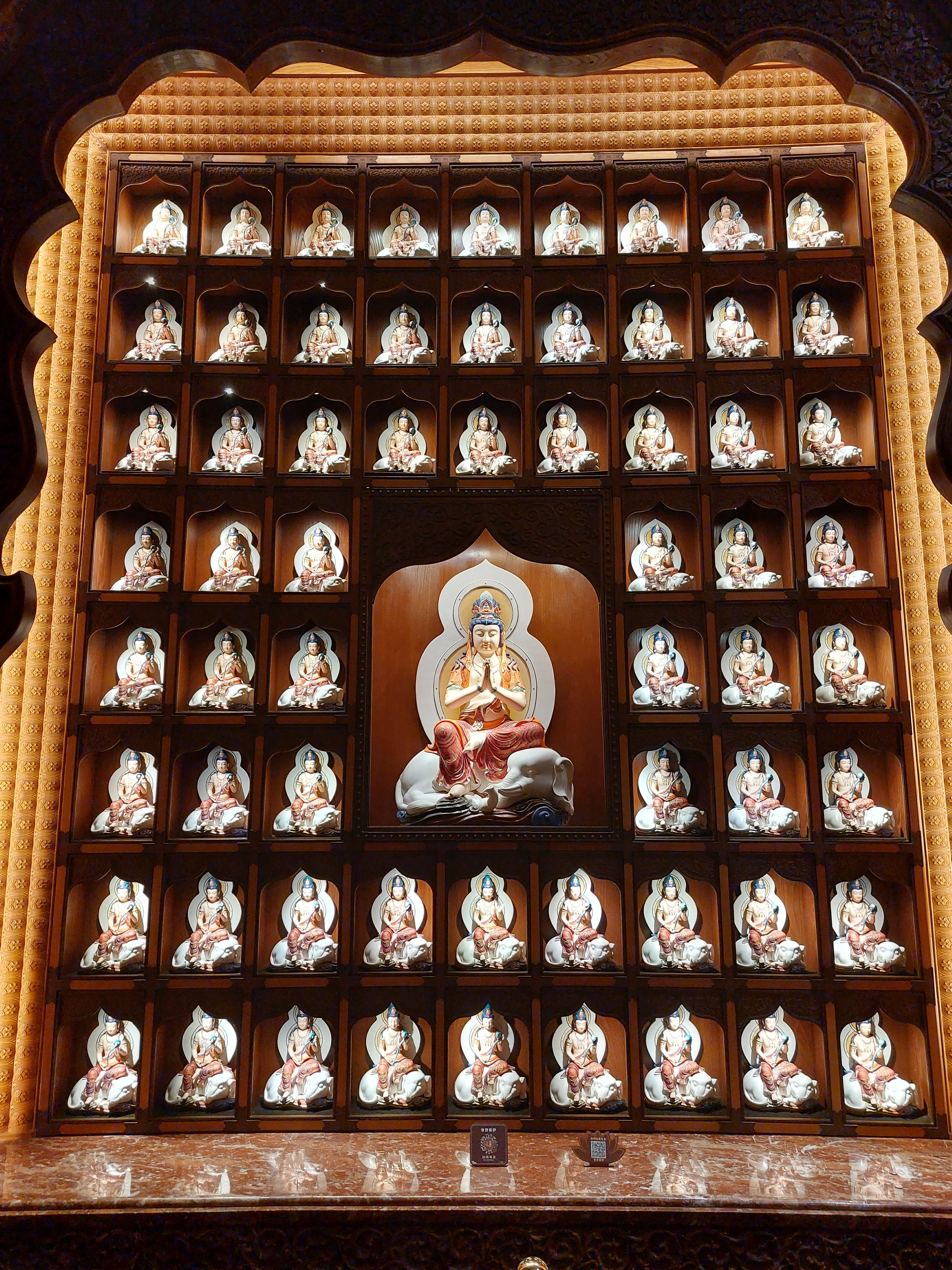
Buddha statues in the palace

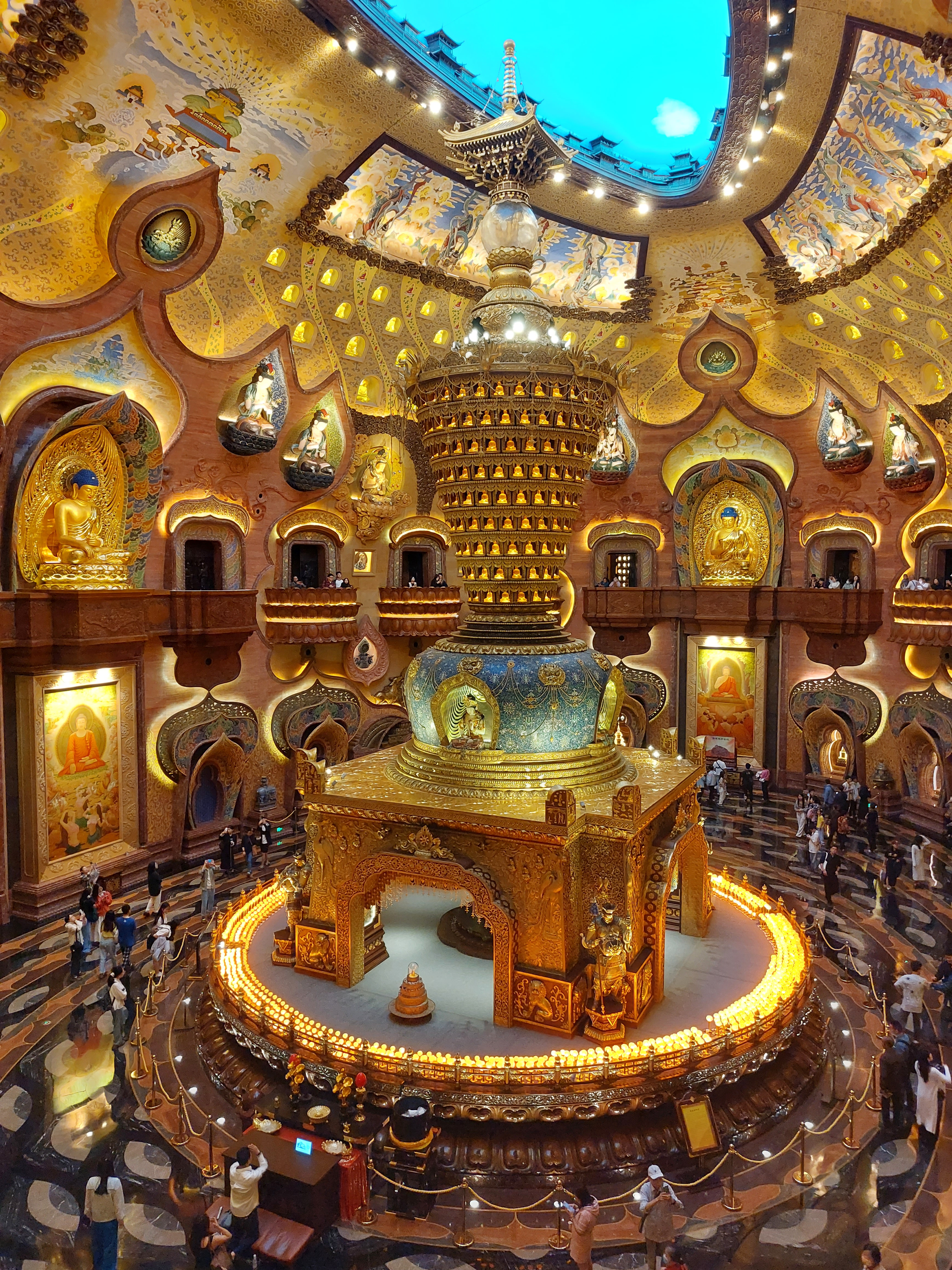
View in the Great Usnisa Hall

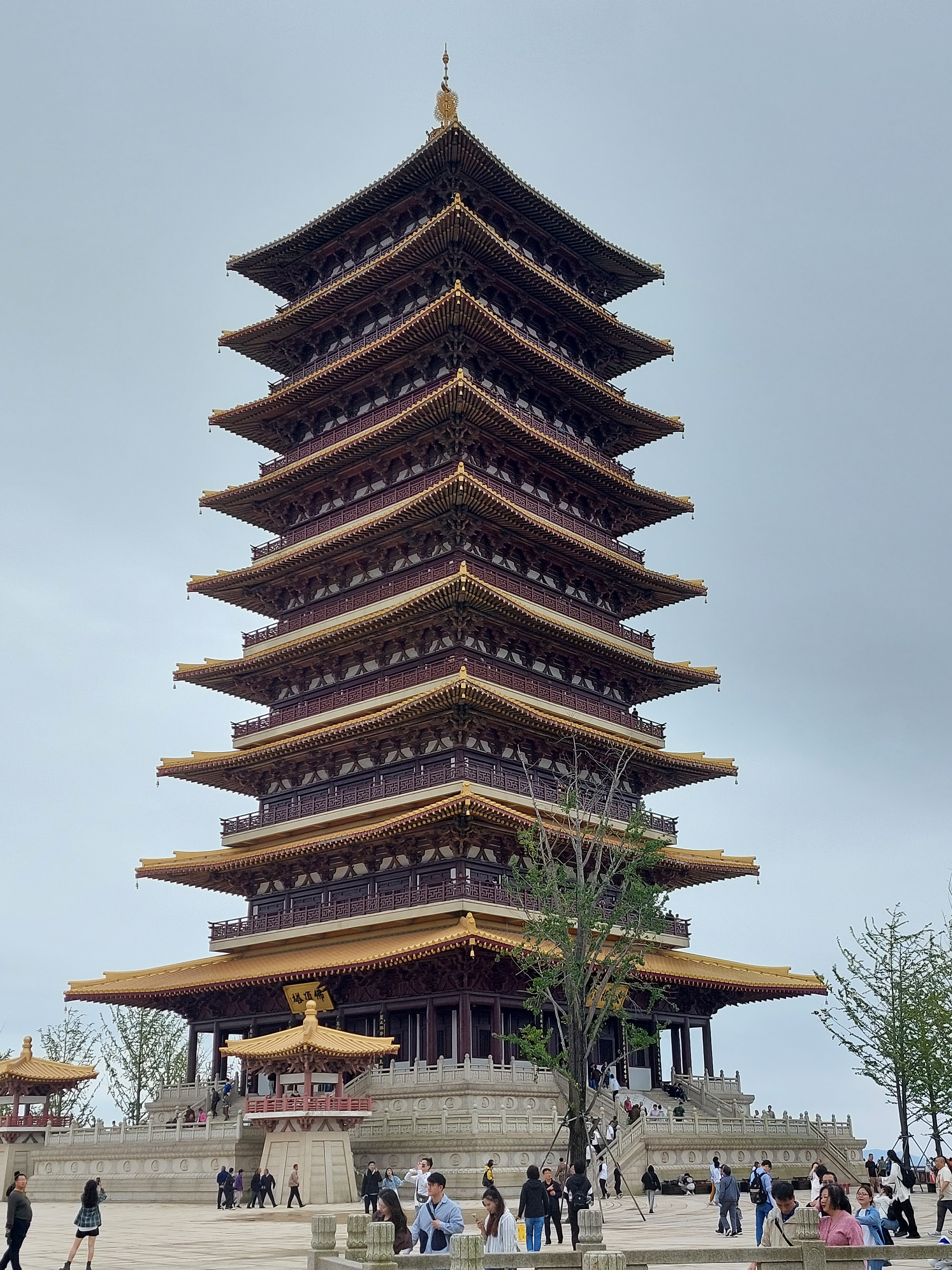
View of the Foding Pagoda

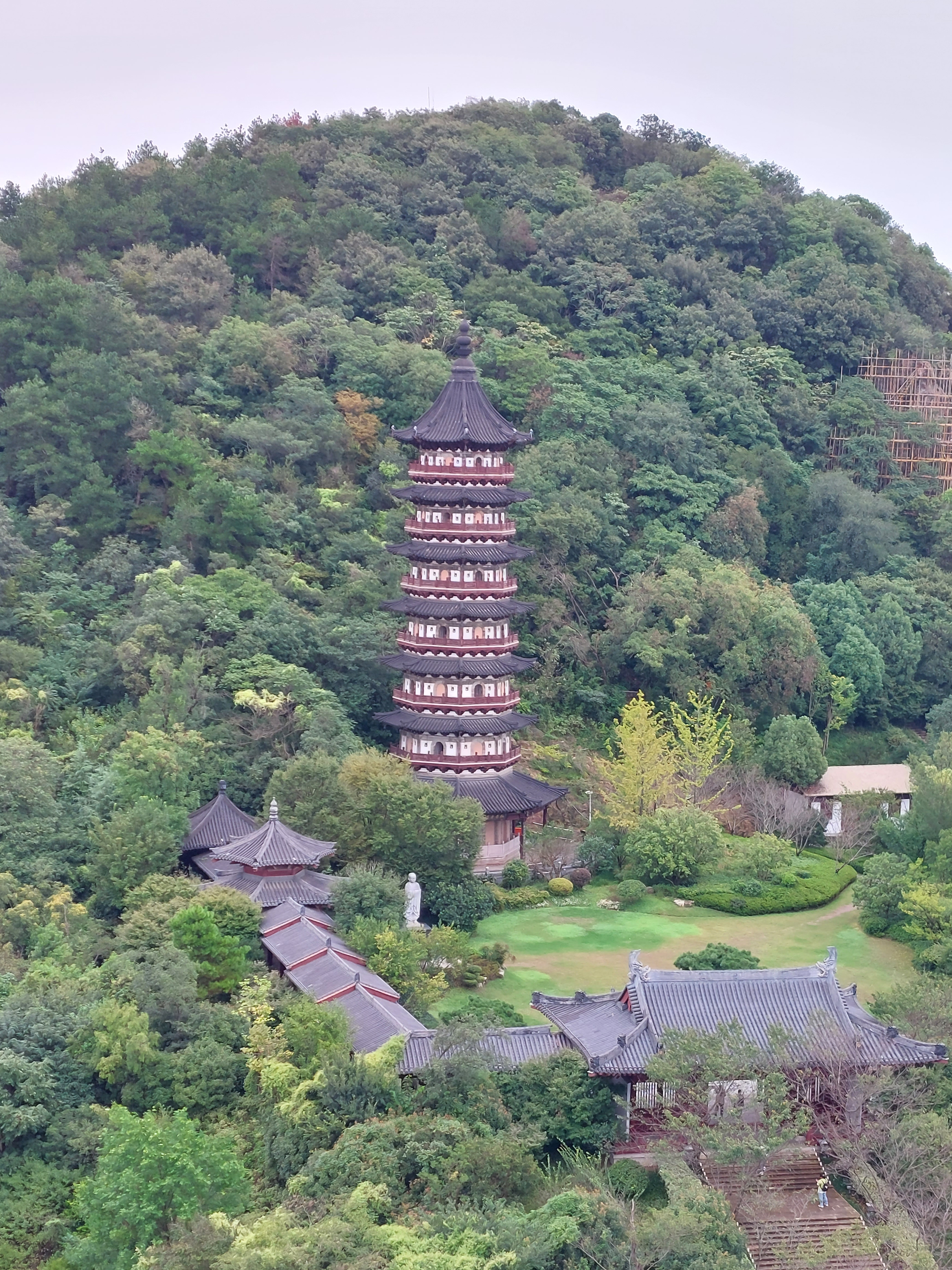
View of the Hongjue Pagoda

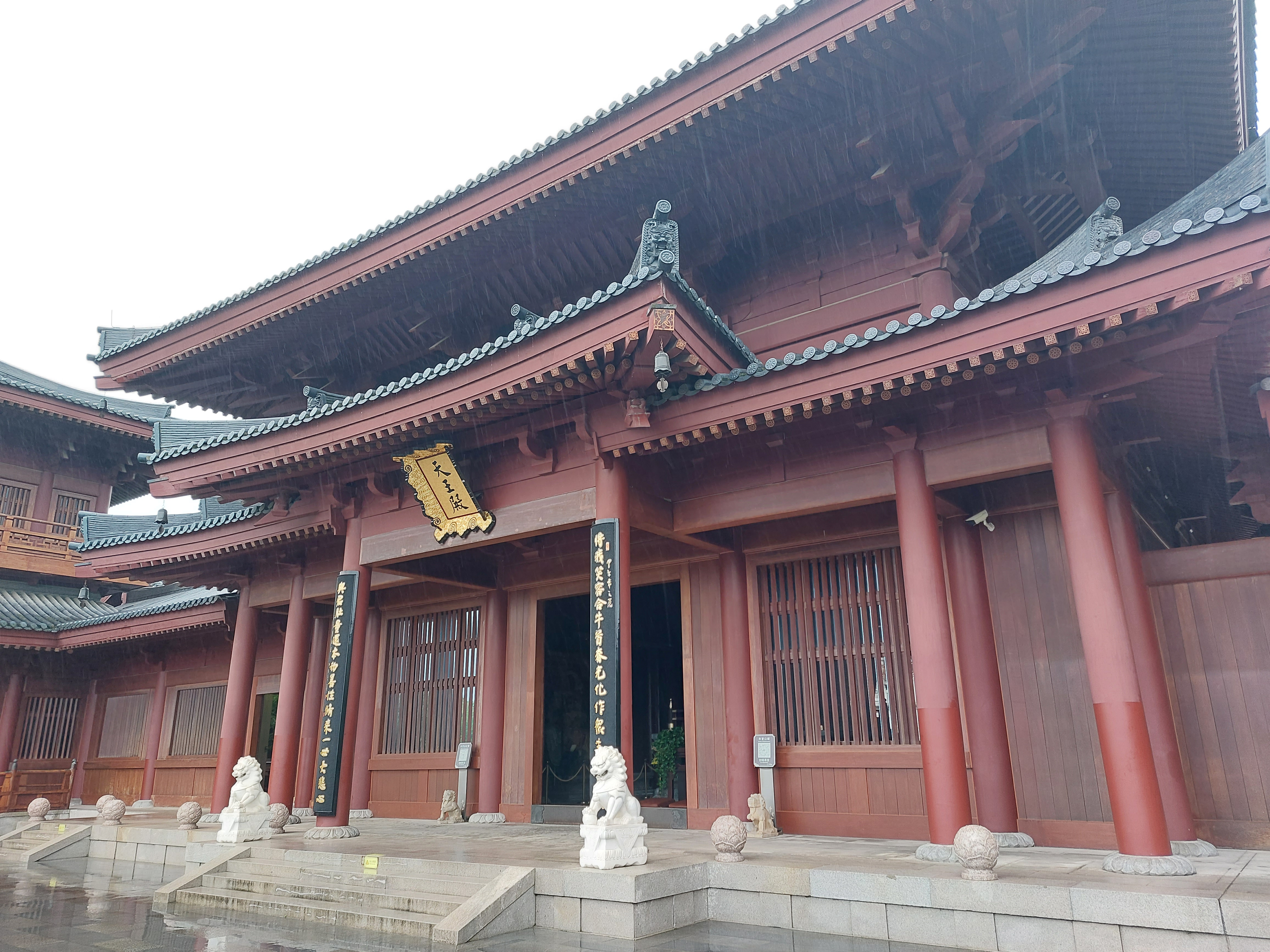
Foding Temple in the Niushoushan Cultural Park

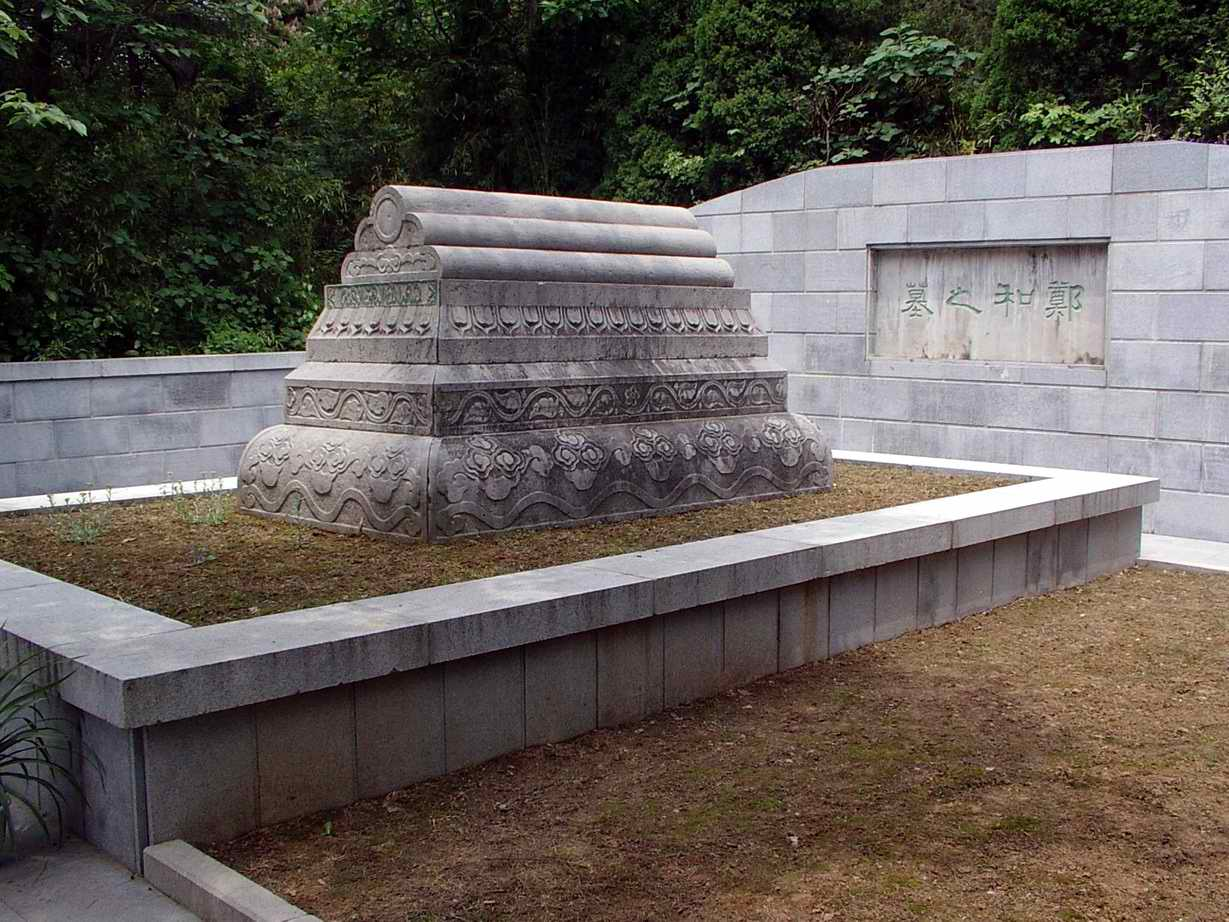
The tomb of Zheng He in the Zheng He Culture Park

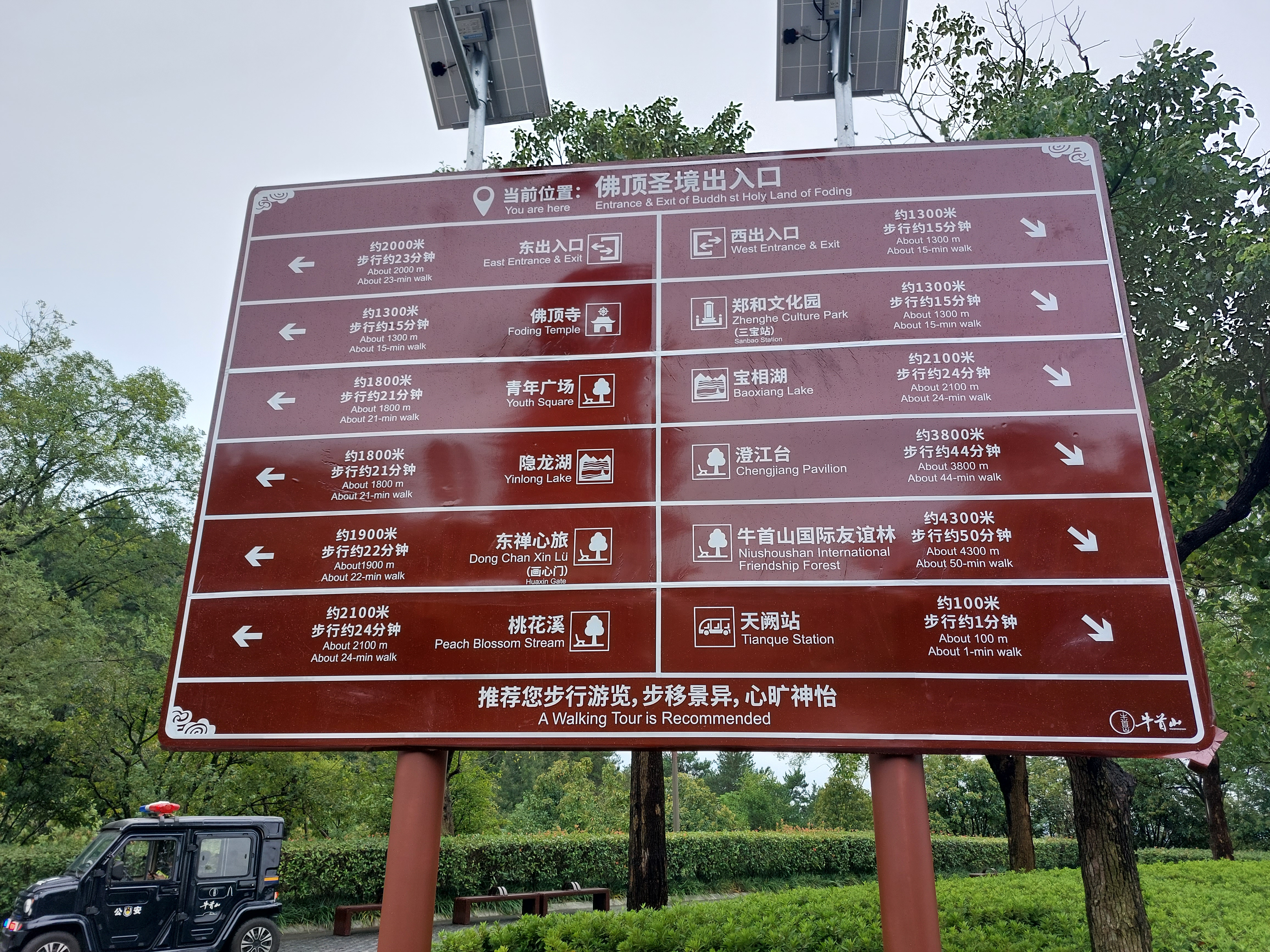
Sign in the Niushoushan Cultural Park

== Culture ==
=== Buddhism and Chan Culture ===
Niushou Mountain has been a famous Buddhist mountain, with over 30 temples from southern dynasty to the Tang Dynasty. During the Liang period of southern dynasty, temples flourished in Nanjing. Niushou Mountain was core area of Buddhist culture in Nanjing. Niushou Mountain, together with Mount Wutai in Shanxi, Mount Emei in Sichuan, is considered as one of the three famous preaching sites.

=== Zheng He and Maritime Culture ===
Zheng He, the world's first intercontinental navigator, led seven voyages across the Western Seas over 28 years, crossing the Indian Ocean and visiting more than 30 countries and regions across Southeast Asia, South Asia, West Asia, and East Africa. Covering over 100,000 nautical miles, these expeditions established the famed Maritime Silk Road. Zheng He's contributions to Chinese and global maritime history, advancements in ancient navigation technology, promotion of international trade, and fostering of cultural exchange remain unparalleled.

Zheng He was also a devout Buddhist. In the first year of the Yongle era, he became a disciple of the monk Yao Daoyan, receiving the Bodhisattva Precepts and adopting the Dharma name "Fujixiang". He dedicated himself to building temples, commissioning Buddhist scriptures, and practicing acts of charity. During his voyages, Zheng He made donations to Buddhist temples in the countries he visited. In the 10th year of the Yongle era, Zheng He was appointed as the overseer of the construction of the Great Bao'en Temple in Nanjing.
