= Nanjing Jiangning Senior High School =

- Nanjing, Jiangsu, People's Republic of China

Information
- Type: Public Secondary
- Motto: Honesty, Strictness, Diligence, Innovation
- Established: 1934
- Principal: ZhouShidong 周世东
- Campus: suburban
- Website: Official site

Nanjing Jiangning Senior High School is a state school in Jiangning District, Nanjing, Jiangsu, China.

== About the school ==
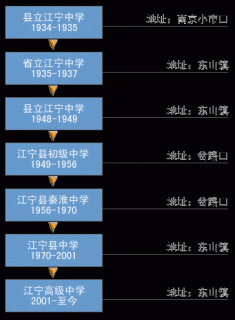
the school history

Nanjing Jiangning Senior High School was founded in 1934, formerly County Jiangning School. It has moved premises five times and changed its name six times. In 1980, it was identified as one of the first key schools that Jiangsu Provincial Government decided to run well (首批办好的省重点中学). In 1992, the school was approved by the government to be the qualified key school (省合格重点中学) after overall inspection. In April 2002, Jiangning Senior High School was awarded "the national model key high school" (国家级示范高中) and then became one of the first Jiangsu four-star high schools (江苏省首批四星级普通高中) in March 2004.

== Awards ==
- Jiangsu Civilization Unit (by the Jiangsu Government, twice)（江苏省文明单位）
- Provincial Moral Advanced School（省德育先进学校）
- Provincial Education and Research Advanced Group（省教科研先进集体）
- Provincial Advanced Unit for Implementation of the Quality Education（省实施素质教育先进单位）

== Educational philosophy ==
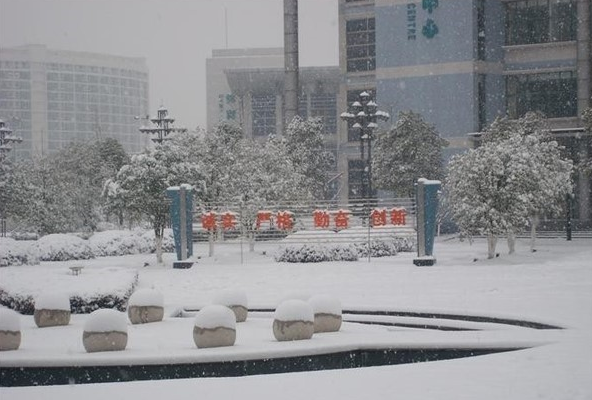
school ethos

- School ethos—honesty, strictness, diligence, innovation（诚实、严格、勤奋、创新）
- Teaching style—rigorousness, realism, aggressiveness, love（严谨、求实、进取、爱生）
- Learning style—diligence, refined thinking, more questions, more practice（勤学、精思、好问、多练）

Since Jiangning Senior High School was identified as one of the first key schools that Jiangsu Provincial Government decided to run well in 1980, all the faculty and students have been inheriting the fine traditions of school, working together as a unit, advancing reforms. Into the new century, under the premise of the full implementation of quality education and comprehensive innovation of educational philosophy and methods, school established the educational philosophy of “putting the foundation for the students’ good behavior, knowledge and innovation” based on the lifelong development of students.

== Talents ==
After 70 years of hard work, Jiangning Senior High School has cultivated over 20,000 students, many of whom were successful, such as the famous writer LuLing（路翎）, well-known economist LiuGuoguang（刘国光）, the member of Chinese Academy of Engineering GongXianyi（宫先仪, the Air Force deputy commander WangLiangwang（王良旺, China Ambassador to Finland ZhangZhijian（张直鉴, Minister of Railways ShengGuangzu（盛光祖, the Asian Games marathon champion ZhaoYoufeng（赵友凤 and the like. In recent years, the quality of education improves continuously with the efforts of teachers and students. The number of graduates admitted to university or college lists first in five counties in Nanjing and ranks among the best in provincial key high schools in Nanjing over these years. The number one in Nanjing GaoKao in 2000 Zhangyun and the number two in Nanjing GaoKao in 2004 Gaoqiang comes from Jiangning Senior High School. Dozens of students are admitted by top universities such as Tsinghua University, Nanjing University, Shanghai Jiaotong University.

== School size ==
To speed up the pace of modernization of education and meet the needs of people for quality education, the new campus of Jiangning Senior High School started to be built in 2002 and in 2004, it came into operation officially. The new campus is located at the foot of FangShan（方山）, near Qinhuai River（秦淮河）, in the Jiangning Science Park, close to the Jiangning University City. It covers an area of 300 mu with a building area of 110,000 square meters and an investment of nearly 200 million yuan. It is beautiful, well-equipped and has the first-class facility.

== Teachers ==
Jiangning Senior High School has a high-quality and high-level teaching body. School has trained an expert who enjoys the State Council Special Allowance（国务院津贴）, 5 special-grade teachers, 82 senior teachers. There are 10 city academic leaders（市学科带头人） and 20 city outstanding young teachers. The number of district academic leaders and youth teaching models is 73. There are 18 teachers who have or will have the master's degree. Now, new teachers are from Beijing Normal University, Huadong Normal University, Nanjing Normal University and Anhui Normal University. Every year, the school will offer some training courses to teachers in summer holiday. Nowadays, new generations of people of Jiangning Senior High School are going forward to create new glories with a brand-new attitude and the spirit of perseverance.

== Other information ==
=== Address ===
669, TianYuan East Road, Science Park, Jiangning District, Nanjing, Jiangsu

=== Zip code ===
211100

== School scenery ==
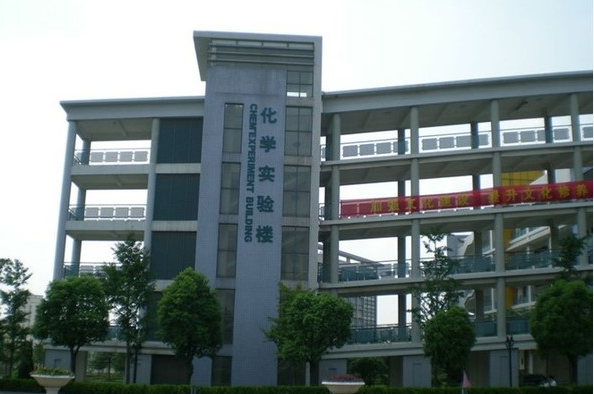
Chemistry experiment building

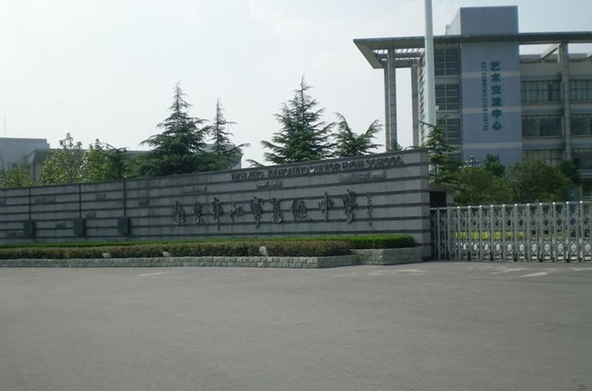
Gate of the school

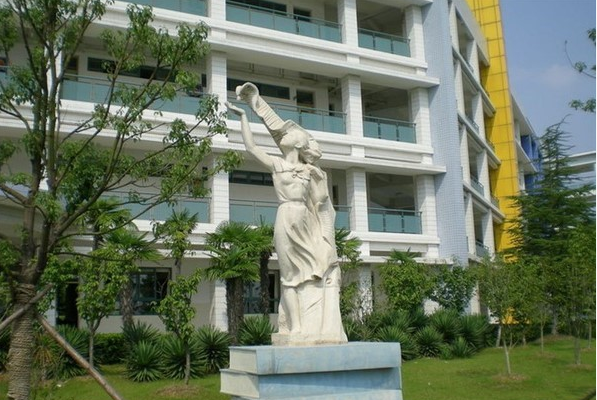
Statue

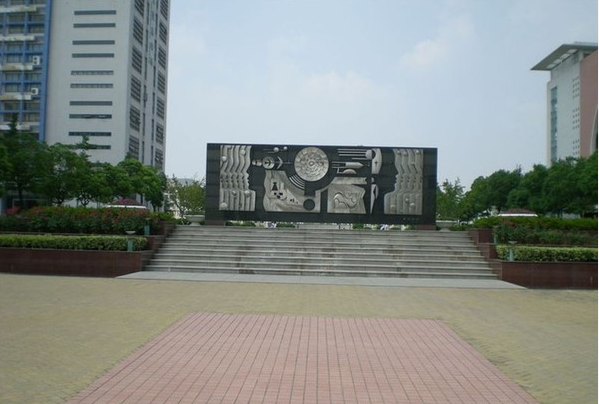
Statue

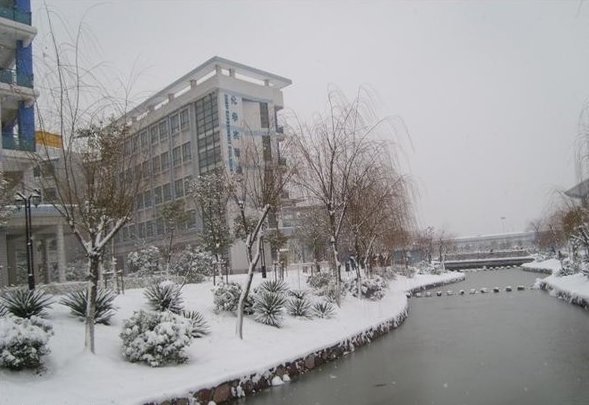
School in snow

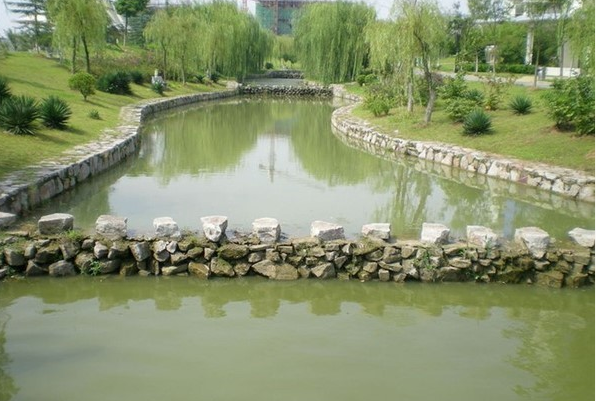
Small pond

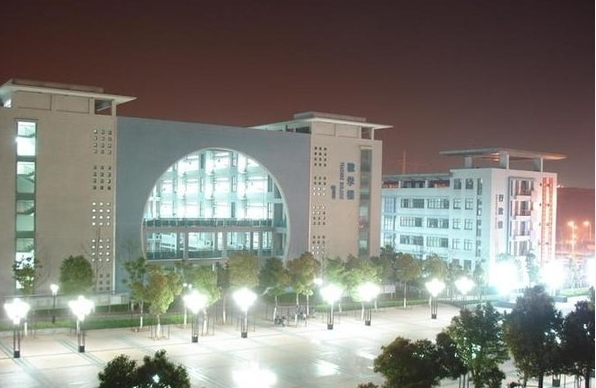
Teaching buildings at night

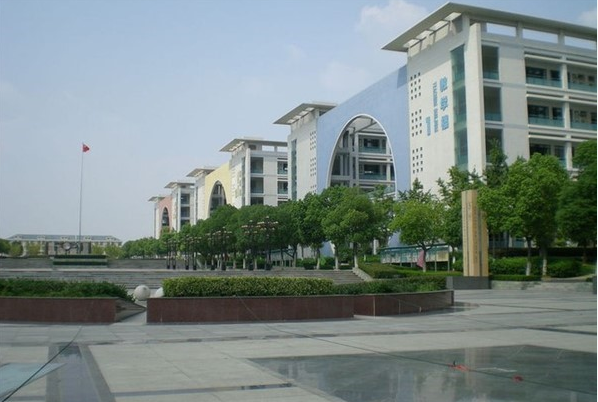
Teaching buildings
