= Jiangning, Nanjing =

Jiangning 江宁区
- District
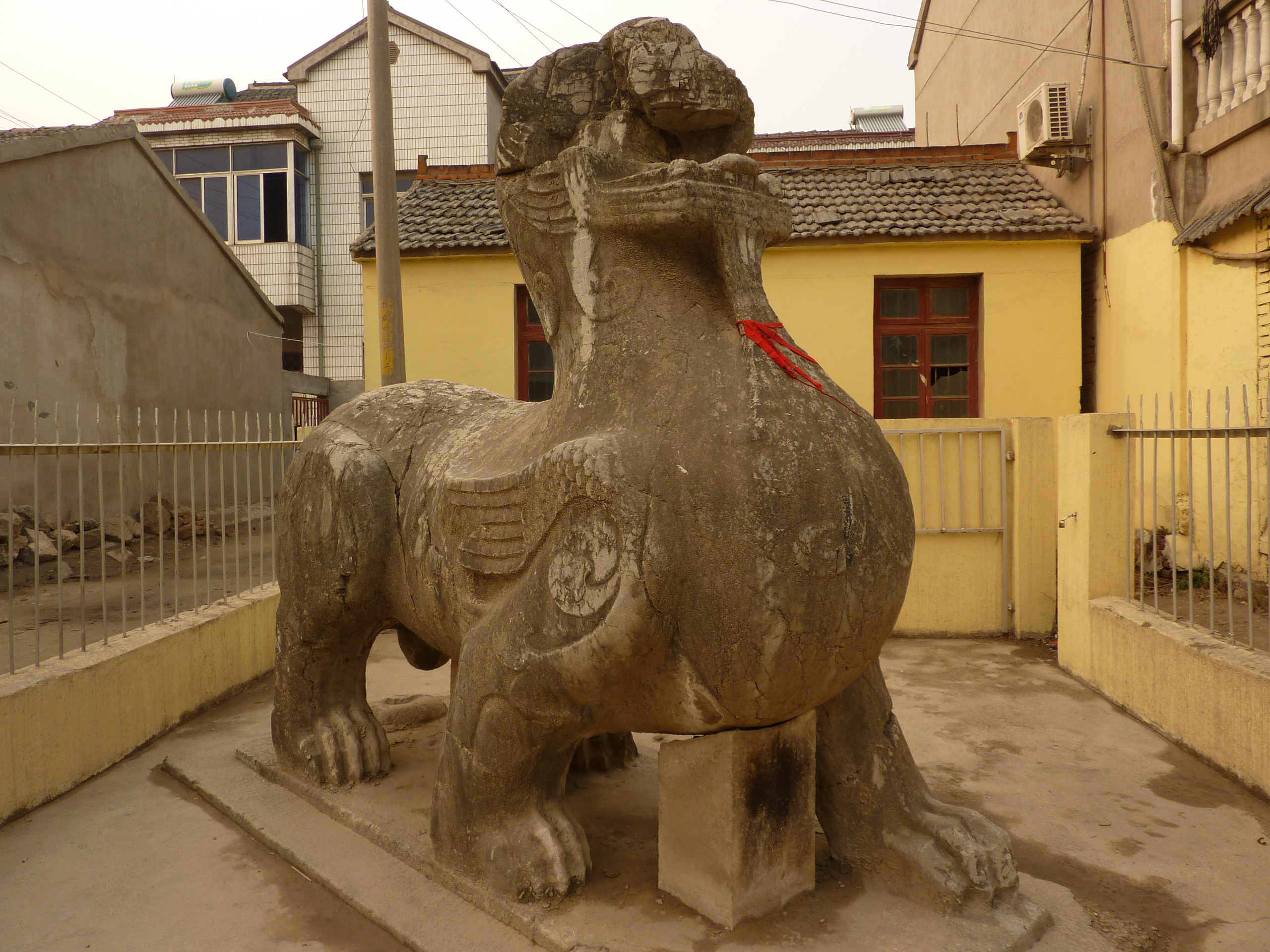
- A Liu Song Dynasty qilin in a resident's front yard in the town of Qilin, Jiangning District.

- Location in Jiangsu
- Coordinates: 31°51′59″N 118°48′07″E
- Country: People's Republic of China
- Province: Jiangsu
- Sub-provincial city: Nanjing

Area
  - District: 1,561 km^{2} (603 sq mi)

Population (2020 census)
  - District: 1,926,117
  - Density: 1,234/km^{2} (3,196/sq mi)
  - Urban: 1,503,459
  - Rural: 422,658
- Time zone: UTC+8 (China Standard)
- Postal Code: 211100
Nanjing district map
Subdivisions of Nanjing, Jiangsu
City Proper
1	Xuanwu
2	Qinhuai
3	Jianye
4	Gulou
5	Yuhuatai
6	Qixia
Suburban
7	Jiangning
8	Pukou
9	Luhe
Rural
10	Lishui
11	Gaochun

Jiangning District (simplified Chinese: 江宁区; traditional Chinese: 江寧區; pinyin: Jiāngníng Qū) is one of 11 districts of Nanjing, the capital of Jiangsu province, China. The District has a population of 1,926,000 and an area of 1,600 square kilometers. It includes southern and south-eastern suburbs of Nanjing.

Jiangning Development Zone is located in this district. It has a population of 210,000. The Zone was approved on February 2, 1997, to be a national-level high and new technology industry development zone. In June 2001, the Zone won the ISO14001 environmental management system certificate. In June 2002, it won the title of the Jiangsu Provincial Base for Electronic and Information Industry. Approved Power automation industry base by National Science Ministry on October 30, 2004.

== Name ==
The name of Jiangning means "peace in Jiangnan", the character "jiang" (江) means "river", which refers to the Yangtze river; the character "ning" (寧) means "peace". Jiangning was established in AD 280, and it was named Linjiang (臨江) at that time. The following year, it was said to be peaceful in Jiangnan (外江無事; wài jiāng wú shì), so the name was changed from Linjiang to Jiangning.

== Historical sites ==
- Chuning Tomb of Emperor Wu of Liu Song (c.422AD), Qilin Town.
- Niushoushan Buddhist cultural park.
- Tomb of Zheng He.
- Yangshan Quarry, with an unfinished giant stele from the reign of the Yongle Emperor, Tangshan Town.

== Transportation ==
- Nanjing Lukou International Airport

== Administrative divisions ==
Jiangning district has ten subdistricts:

- Dongshan (东山街道)
- Moling (秣陵街道)
- Tangshan (汤山街道)
- Chunhua (淳化街道)
- Lukou (禄口街道)
- Jiangning (江宁街道)
- Guli (谷里街道)
- Hushu (湖熟街道)
- Hengxi (横溪街道)
- Qilin (麒麟街道)

== Climate ==
Climate data for Jiangning District, elevation 22 m (72 ft), (1991–2020 normals)
Month	Jan	Feb	Mar	Apr	May	Jun	Jul	Aug	Sep	Oct	Nov	Dec	Year
Mean daily maximum °C (°F)	7.3 (45.1)	10.2 (50.4)	14.4 (57.9)	21.1 (70.0)	26.3 (79.3)	29.4 (84.9)	32.6 (90.7)	31.7 (89.1)	28.1 (82.6)	22.8 (73.0)	16.5 (61.7)	9.9 (49.8)	20.9 (69.5)
Daily mean °C (°F)	3.3 (37.9)	5.9 (42.6)	9.8 (49.6)	16.1 (61.0)	21.4 (70.5)	25.2 (77.4)	28.5 (83.3)	27.7 (81.9)	23.8 (74.8)	18.2 (64.8)	11.9 (53.4)	5.7 (42.3)	16.5 (61.6)
Mean daily minimum °C (°F)	0.3 (32.5)	2.5 (36.5)	6.2 (43.2)	12.0 (53.6)	17.3 (63.1)	21.7 (71.1)	25.4 (77.7)	24.7 (76.5)	20.5 (68.9)	14.6 (58.3)	8.1 (46.6)	2.6 (36.7)	13.0 (55.4)
Average precipitation mm (inches)	55.4 (2.18)	47.9 (1.89)	90.6 (3.57)	85.2 (3.35)	93.3 (3.67)	199.8 (7.87)	221.9 (8.74)	132.7 (5.22)	61.2 (2.41)	55.7 (2.19)	51.2 (2.02)	33.8 (1.33)	1,128.7 (44.44)
Average precipitation days (≥ 0.1 mm)	9.1	8.5	11.5	9.8	10.4	11.1	11.4	11.6	7.0	7.4	7.5	7.4	112.7
Average snowy days	3.3	2.3	1.2	0	0	0	0	0	0	0	0.4	1.1	8.3
Average relative humidity (%)	73	70	71	70	71	76	79	80	75	72	72	72	73
Mean monthly sunshine hours	124.7	127.4	140.9	165.8	178.6	152.6	194.2	182.1	168.1	166.6	145.0	126.3	1,872.3
Percentage possible sunshine	39	41	38	42	42	36	45	45	46	48	46	41	42
Source: China Meteorological Administration

== Education ==
The following schools are in Jiangning District:

- British School of Nanjing
- Nanjing Jiangning Senior High School
