= Yangshan Quarry =

Stone quarry in Jiangsu, China

- Yangshan Quarry
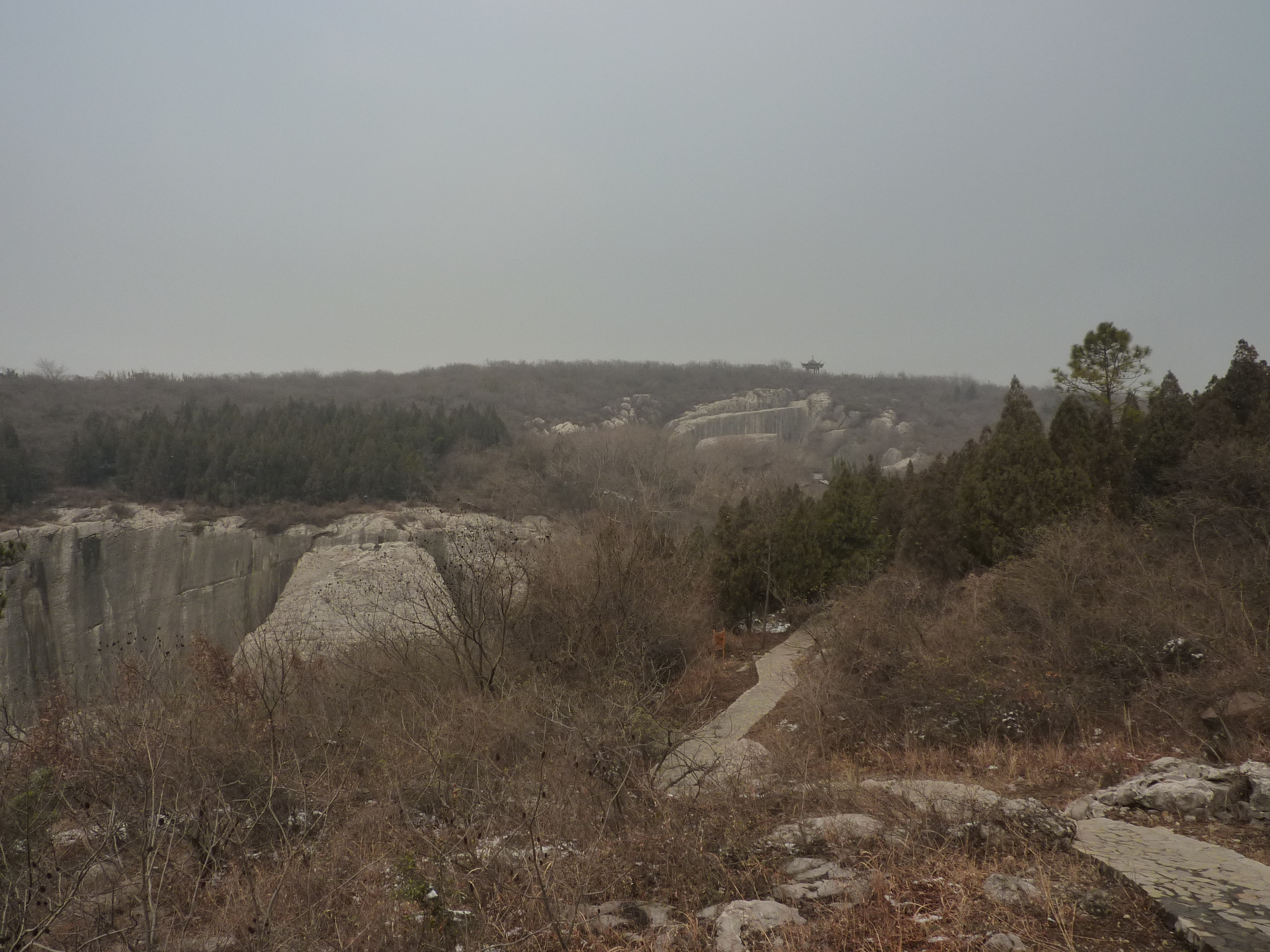
- An overall view of the quarry site from a walking trail. The stele base, center left; the stele body, and the stele head in front of it, near the horizon, a bit right of center

- Location within China
- 32°04′06″N 119°00′02″E
- Location: Nanjing, China

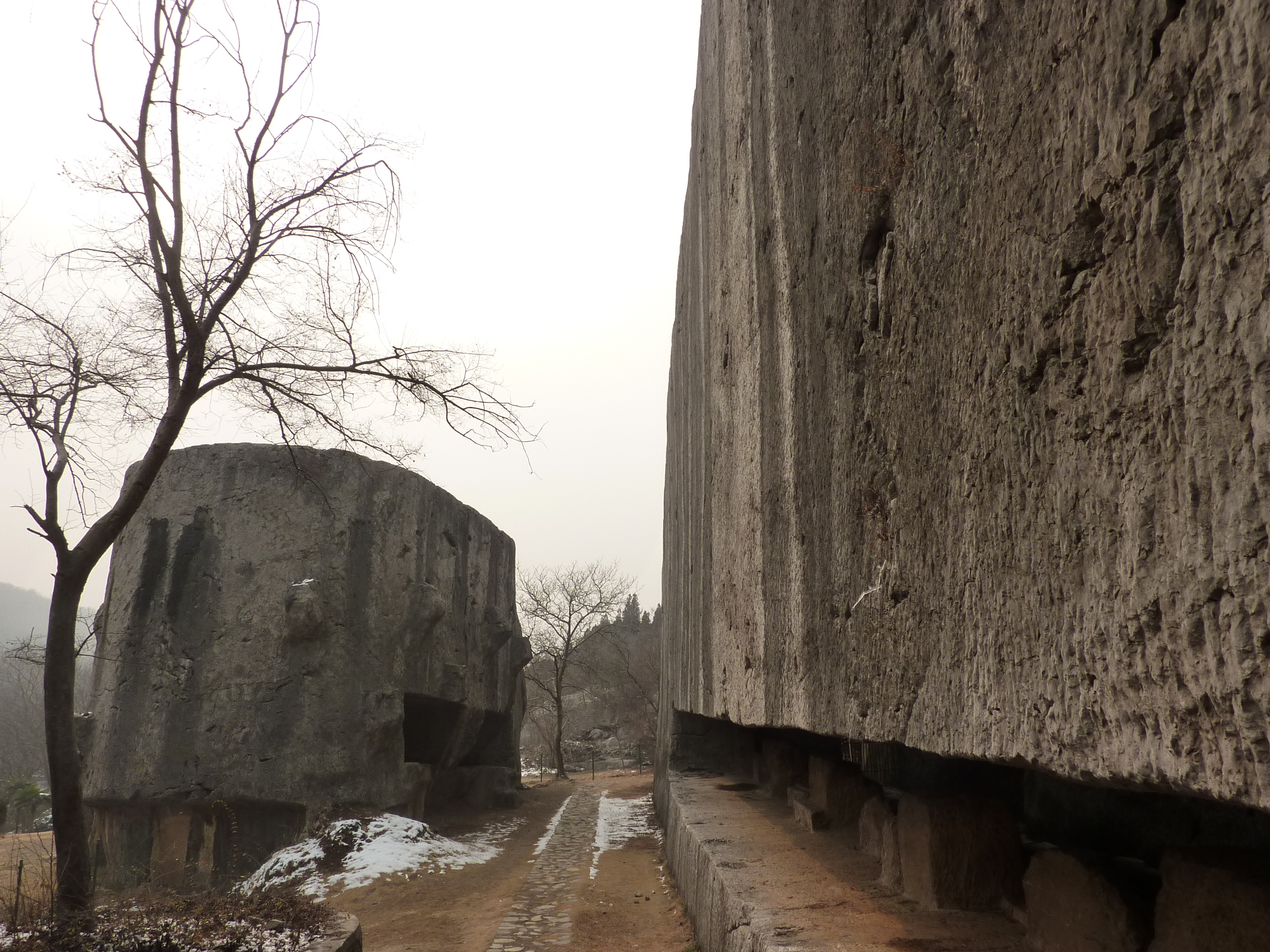
The unfinished stele body (right) and the stele head (left). The work on the dragon design had been started on the head before the project was abandoned

The Yangshan Quarry (Chinese: 阳山碑材; pinyin: Yángshān bēi cái; lit. 'Yangshan Stele Material') is an ancient stone quarry near Nanjing, China. Used many centuries as a source of stone for buildings and monuments of Nanjing, it is preserved as a historic site. The quarry is famous for the gigantic unfinished stele that was abandoned there during the reign of the Yongle Emperor in the early 15th century. In scope and ambition, the stele project is compared to other public works projects of Yongle era, which included the launching of the treasure fleet for Zheng He's maritime expeditions and the construction of the Forbidden City in Beijing.

== Location ==
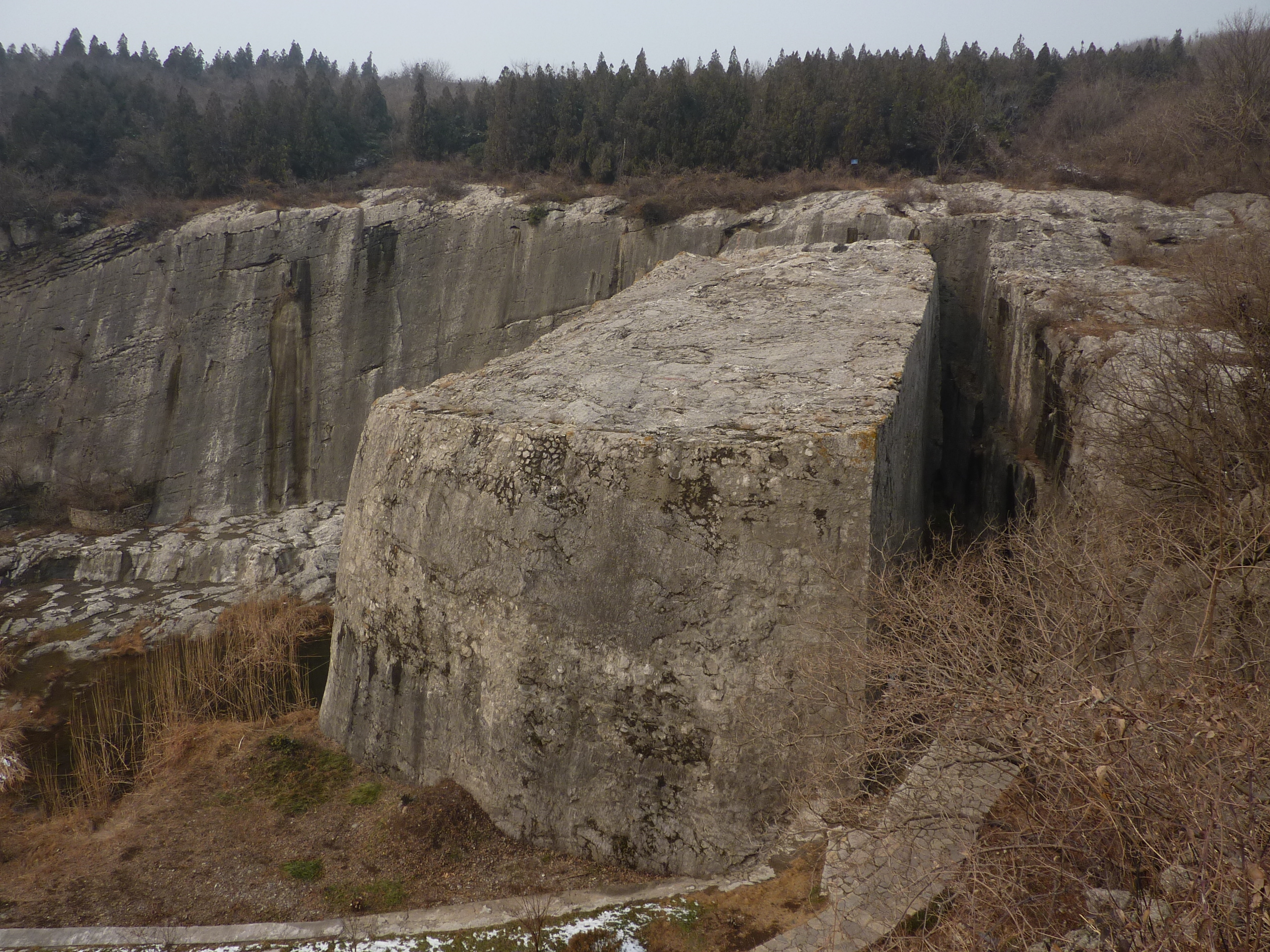
The stele base, partly separated from the body of the mountain

The Yangshan Quarry is situated on the Yangshan Mountain (elevation 140 m), also known as Yanmen Shan (雁门山), northwest of Tangshan Town (汤山镇). The Yangshan is the main peak of the Kongshan Mountain Range (孔山山脉). The site is located 15–20 km to the east from the eastern part of Nanjing City Wall and the Ming Xiaoling Mausoleum. Administratively, the area is in the Jiangning District of Nanjing City, Jiangsu Province.

== History ==
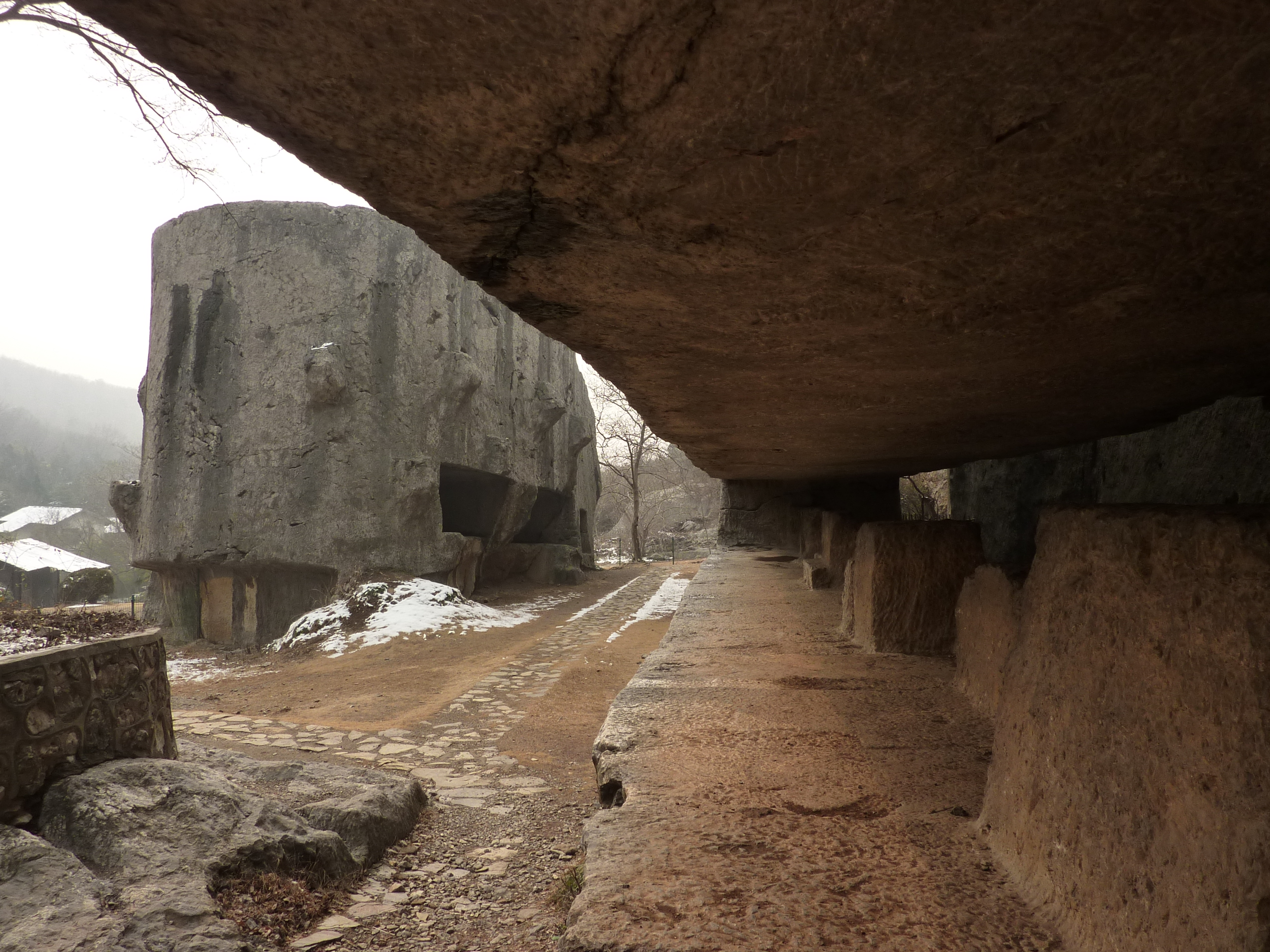
Under the stele body, mostly separated from the rock under it

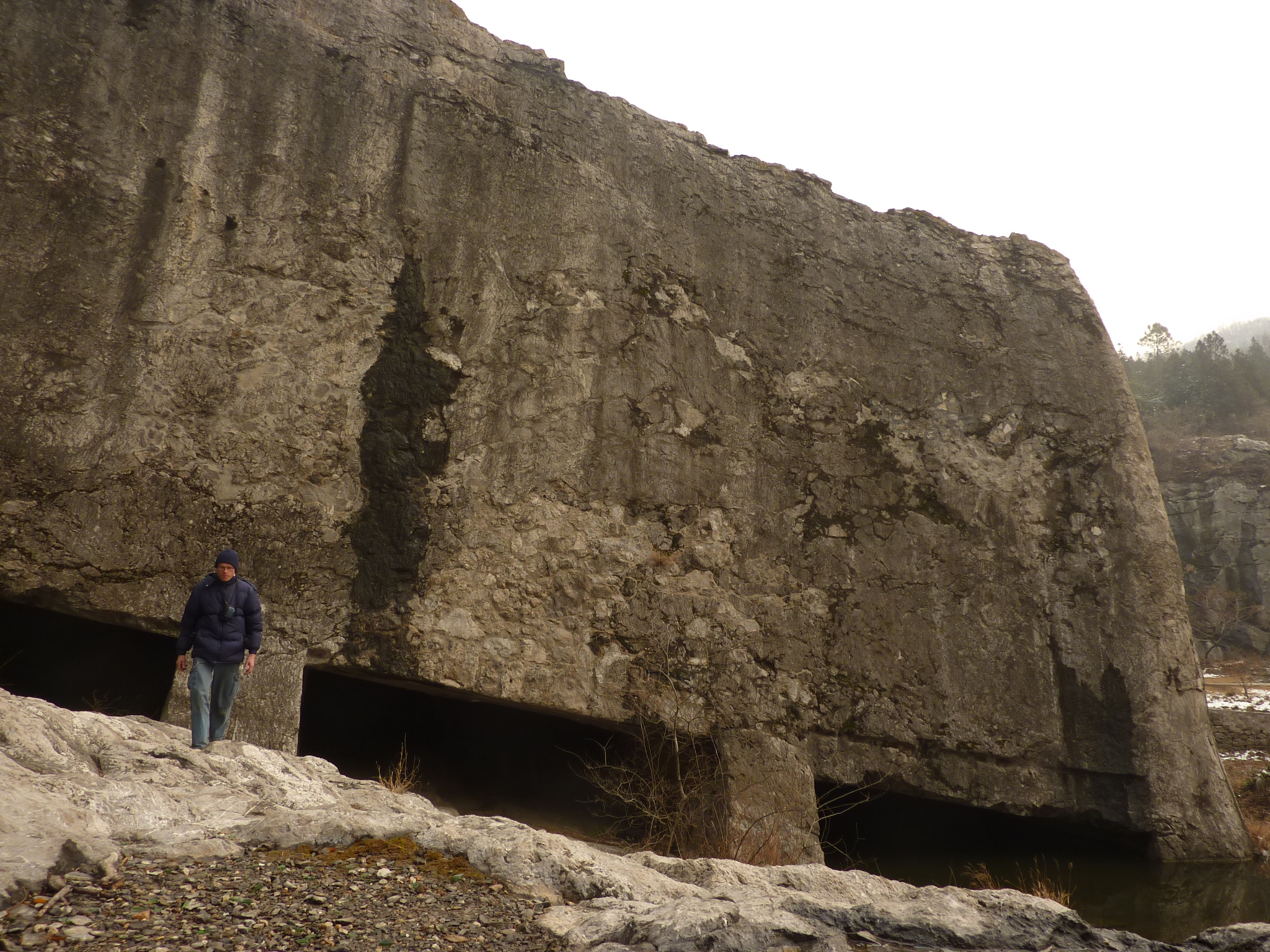
The stele base, with a hiker next to it for scale

The Yangshan Quarry has been worked from the time of the Six Dynasties, the local limestone being used for construction of buildings, walls, and statues in and around Nanjing.

After Zhu Yuanzhang (the Hongwu Emperor) founded the Ming dynasty in 1368, the city of Nanjing became the capital city of his empire. The Yangshan quarry became the main source of stone for the major construction projects that changed the face of Nanjing. In 1405, Hongwu's son, the Yongle Emperor, ordered the cutting of a giant stele in this quarry, for use in the Ming Xiaoling Mausoleum of his deceased father. In accordance with the usual design of a Chinese memorial stele, three separate pieces were being cut: the rectangular stele base (pedestal), the stele body, and the stele head (crown, to be decorated with a dragon design). After most of the stone-cutting work had been done, the architects realized that moving stones that big from Yangshan to Ming Xiaoling, let alone installing them there in a proper way, would not be physically possible. As a result, the project was abandoned. In place of the stele, a much smaller tablet (still, the largest in the Nanjing area), known as the Shengong Shengde ("Divine Merits and Godly Virtues") Stele was installed in Ming Xiaoling's "Square Pavilion" (Sifangcheng) in 1413.

The three unfinished stele components remain in Yangshan Quarry to this day, only partially separated from the solid rock of the mountain. The present dimensions and the usual weight estimates of the steles are as follows:

- The Stele Base (32°04′03″N 119°00′00″E), 30.35 m (99.6 ft) long, 13 m (43 ft) thick, 16 m (52 ft) tall, 16,250 metric tons.
- The Stele Body (32°04′07″N 119°00′02″E), 49.4 m (162 ft) long (this would be the height, if the stele were to be properly installed), 10.7 m (35 ft) wide, 4.4 m (14 ft) thick, 8,799 tons.
- The Stele Head (32°04′06″N 119°00′02″E), 10.7 m (35 ft) tall, 20.3 m (67 ft) wide, 8.4 m (28 ft) thick, 6,118 tons.

According to experts, if the stele had been finished and put together, by installing the stele body vertically on the base, and topping with the stele head, then it would have stood 73 metres (240 ft) tall. For comparison, the Shengong Shengde Stele actually installed in Ming Xiaoling is 8.78 metres (28.8 ft) tall (6.7 m (22 ft) body + crown, on top of a 2.8 m (9 ft 2 in) tall tortoise pedestal). The Song-dynasty (early 12th century) Wan Ren Chou ("Ten Thousand Men's Sorrow") Stele in Qufu, which is thought to be one of the tallest in China, is 16.95 m (55.6 ft) tall, 3.75 m (12.3 ft) wide, 1.14 m (3 ft 9 in) thick.

== Cultural references ==
According to a legend, workers who failed to produce the daily quota of crushed rock of at least 33 sheng would be executed on the spot. In memory of the workers who died on the construction site—including those who died from overwork and disease—a nearby village became known as Fentou (坟头), or "Grave Mound". Ann Paludan translates the place name as "Death's Head Valley".

In the centuries since the giant stele project was abandoned, a number of Ming, Qing, and modern authors visited the site and left accounts of it. The poet Yuan Mei (1716 – 1797) expressed his feelings in "The Song of Hongwu's Great Stone Tablet" (洪武大石碑歌), which concludes with "one hundred thousand camels could not move it!" ("十万骆驼拉不起"). The poem is published in his collection Xiao Cangshan Fang Wenji (小仓山房文集).

== Present day ==
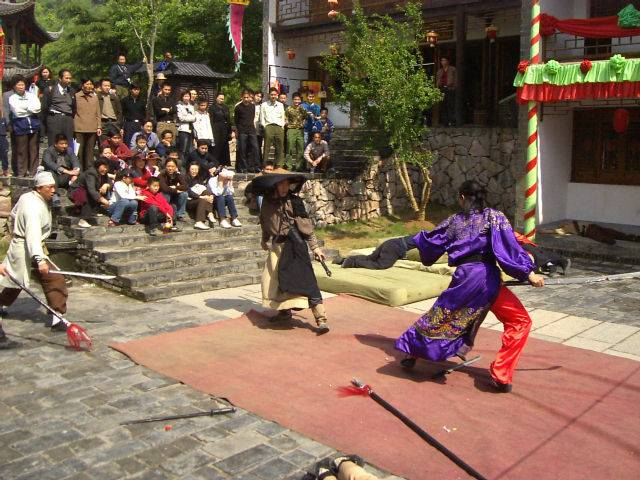
Performance at the Ming Culture Village

In 1956, the Yangshan Quarry was entered on the Jiangsu provincial register of protected cultural monuments. It is maintained as a tourist site, although, according to journalists who visited it at the turn of the 21st century, the site was little known even in Nanjing itself, and had few visitors.

A small theme park called the Ming Culture Village (明文化村, Míng Wénhuà Cūn) was constructed at the entrance to the site; as of 2011, it has a stage, children's rides, and various history-themed amusements. A single admission ticket allows one to visit the "village" and then to walk some 300–400 m (980–1,310 ft) to the quarry proper on one of several forest trails. The site is open year-round, but still is mostly deserted in winter.

Transportation from Nanjing to the Yangshan Quarry (either directly to the Ming Culture Village's entrance plaza, or to the "Yangshan Quarry" stop on the Jiangsu Provincial Highway 122 (S122)) is provided by several bus routes, including the Nanjing-Tangshan Line (南汤线, Nán-Tāng Xiàn) from the Nanjing Railway Station.

== Literature ==
- Yang, Xinhua (杨新华); Lu, Haiming (卢海鸣) (2001), 南京明清建筑 (Ming and Qing architecture of Nanjing), 南京大学出版社 (Nanjing University Press), ISBN 7-305-03669-2
- Ma, Weiyuan (马渭源) (2011), 大明帝国之朱棣卷 (The Book of Ming Empire's Zhu Di), ISBN 978-7-5641-2865-4
