= Jiangning Subdistrict =

Subdistrict in Nanjing, China

Coordinates: 31.8666°N 118.6034°E

Jiangning Subdistrict (江宁街道) is a subdistrict of Jiangning District, Nanjing, Jiangsu, China.
