= Yaxi =

Yaxi may refer to these places in China:

- Yaxi Subdistrict, in Gaochun District, Nanjing, Jiangsu
- Yaxi, Shandong, in Rongcheng, Shandong
- Yaxi, Zhejiang, in Lishui, Zhejiang
