= Tuanjiewei station =

Nanjing Metro station

Tuanjiewei 团结圩
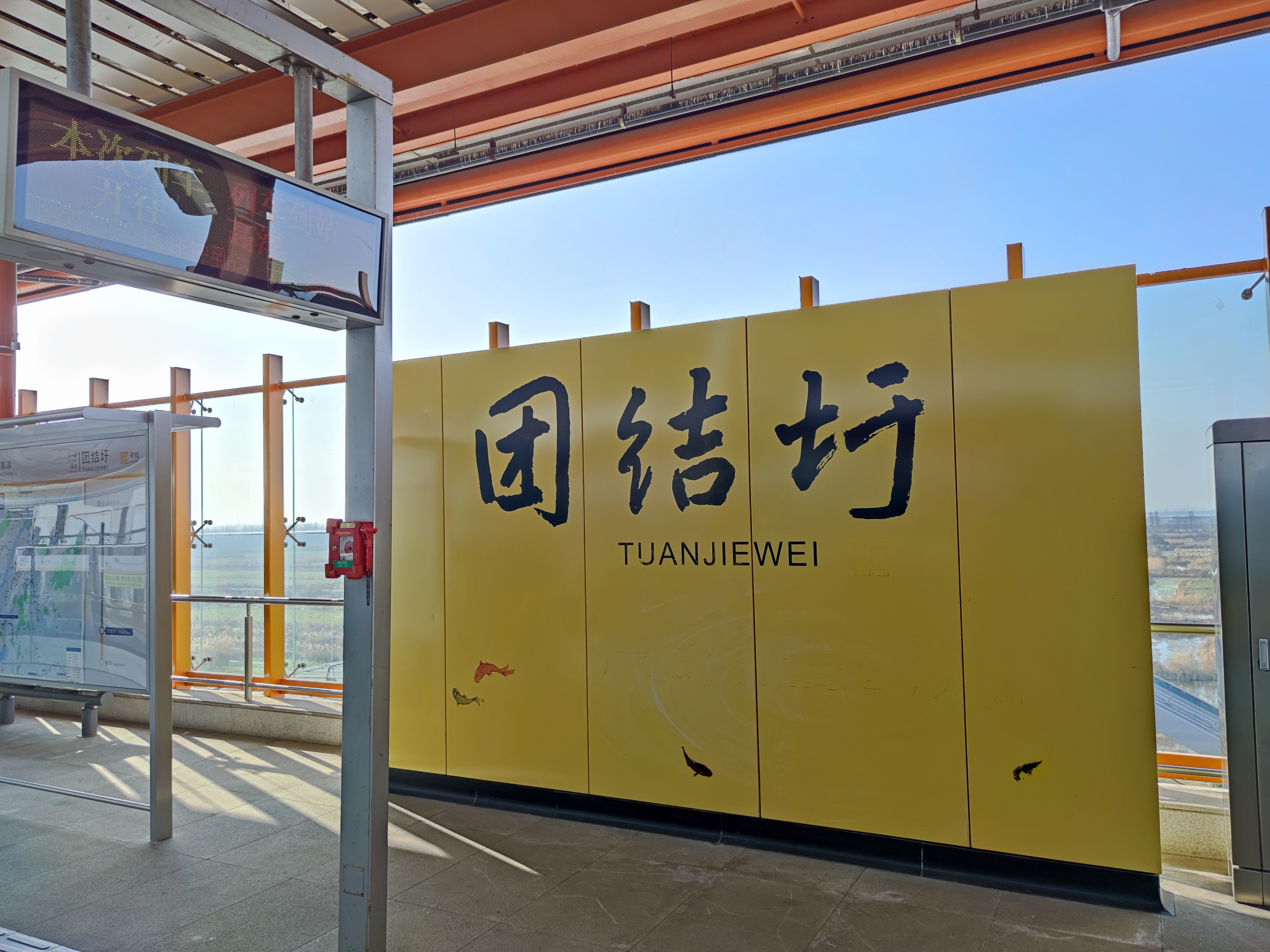

General information
- Location: Gaochun District, Nanjing, Jiangsu; China
- Coordinates: 31.3980°N 118.8827°E
- Operated by: Nanjing Metro Co. Ltd.
- Line: Line S9

History
- Opened: 30 December 2017

Services
Preceding station	Nanjing Metro	Following station
Mingjue towards Xiangyulunan	Line S9	Gaochun Terminus
Location

Tuanjiewei station (Chinese: 团结圩站) is a station of Line S9 of the Nanjing Metro. It started operations on 30 December 2017.
