= Southern Jiangsu =

Geographical region of Jiangsu, China

Southern Jiangsu 苏南
- Region
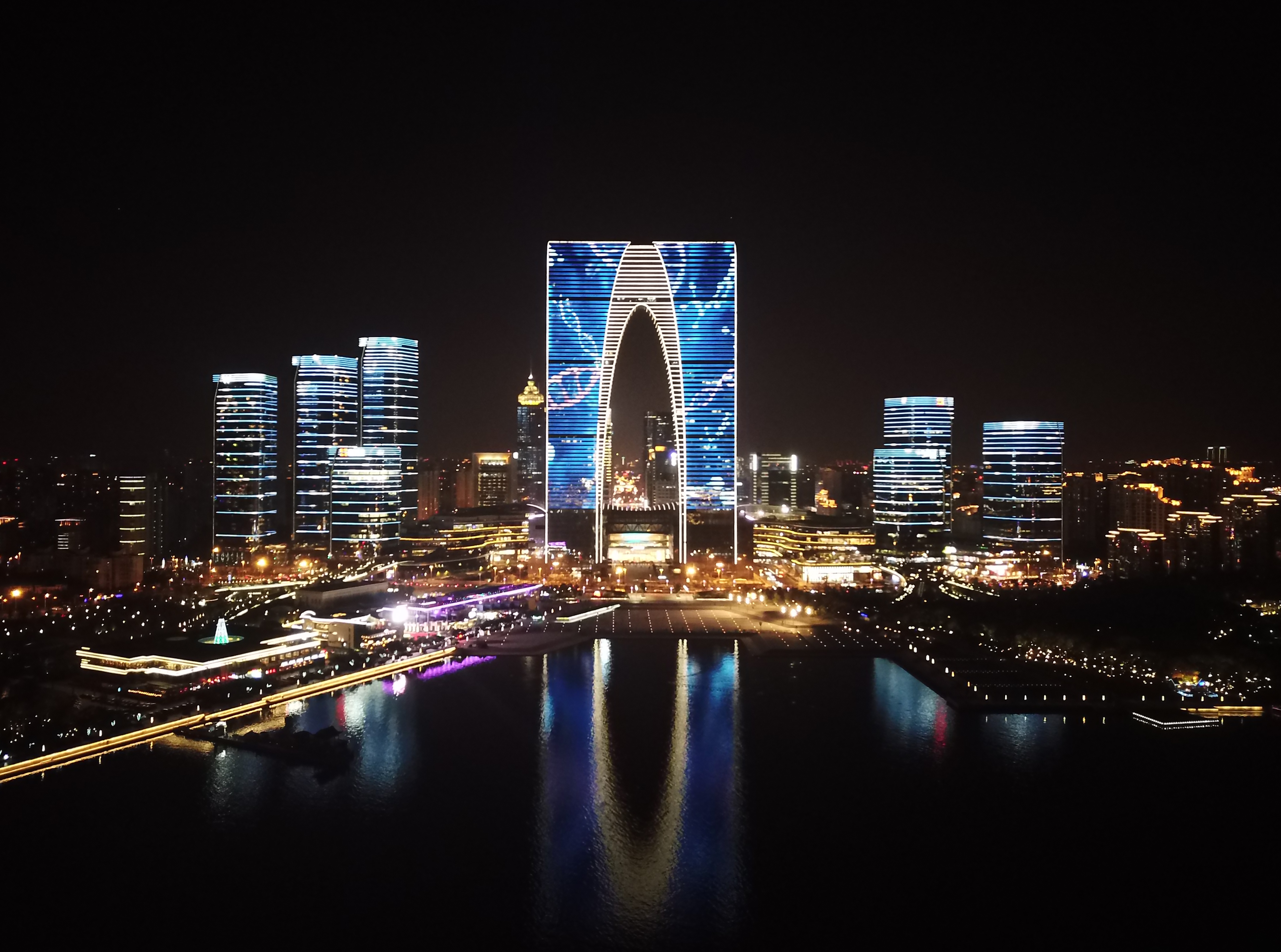
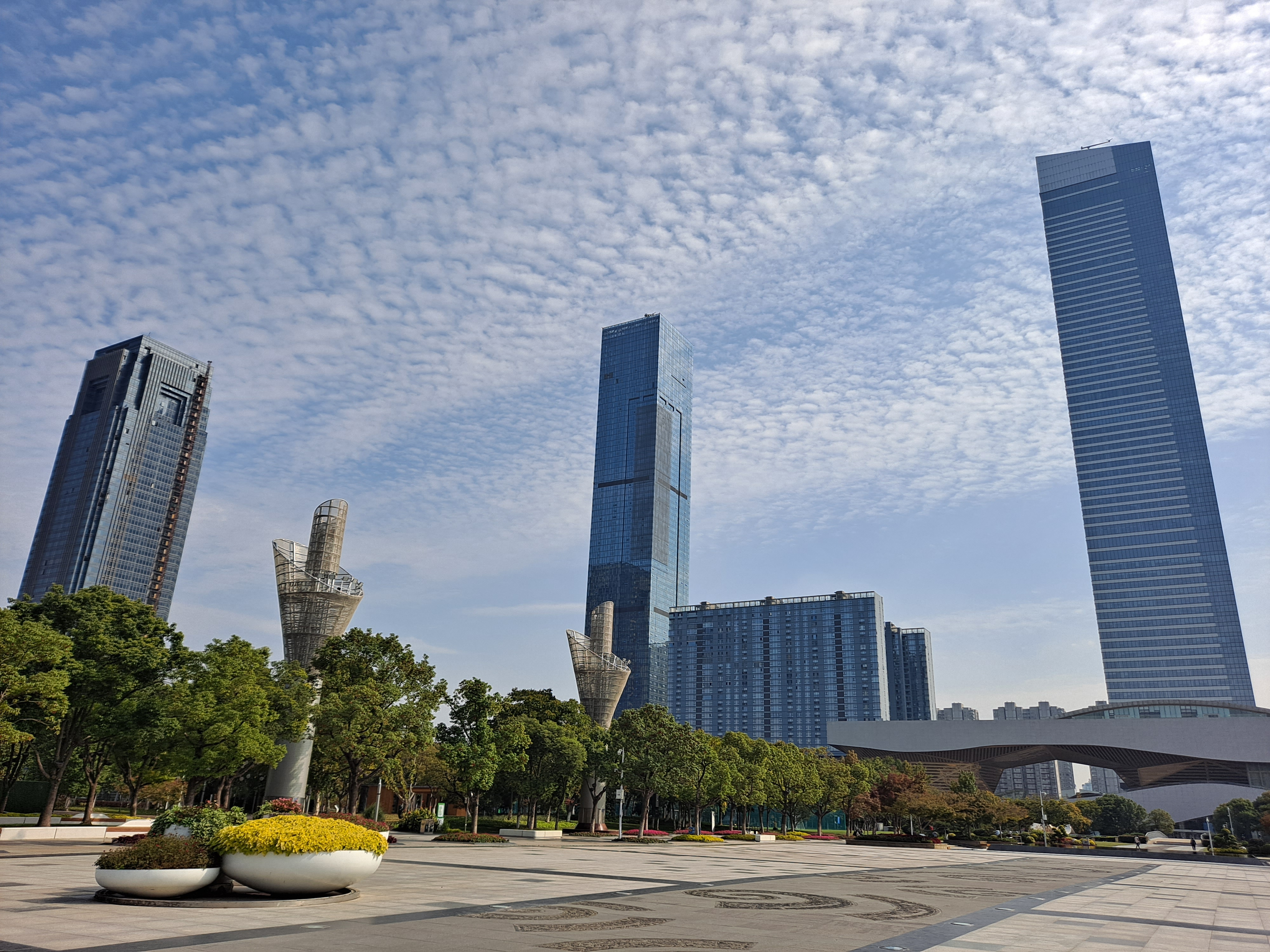
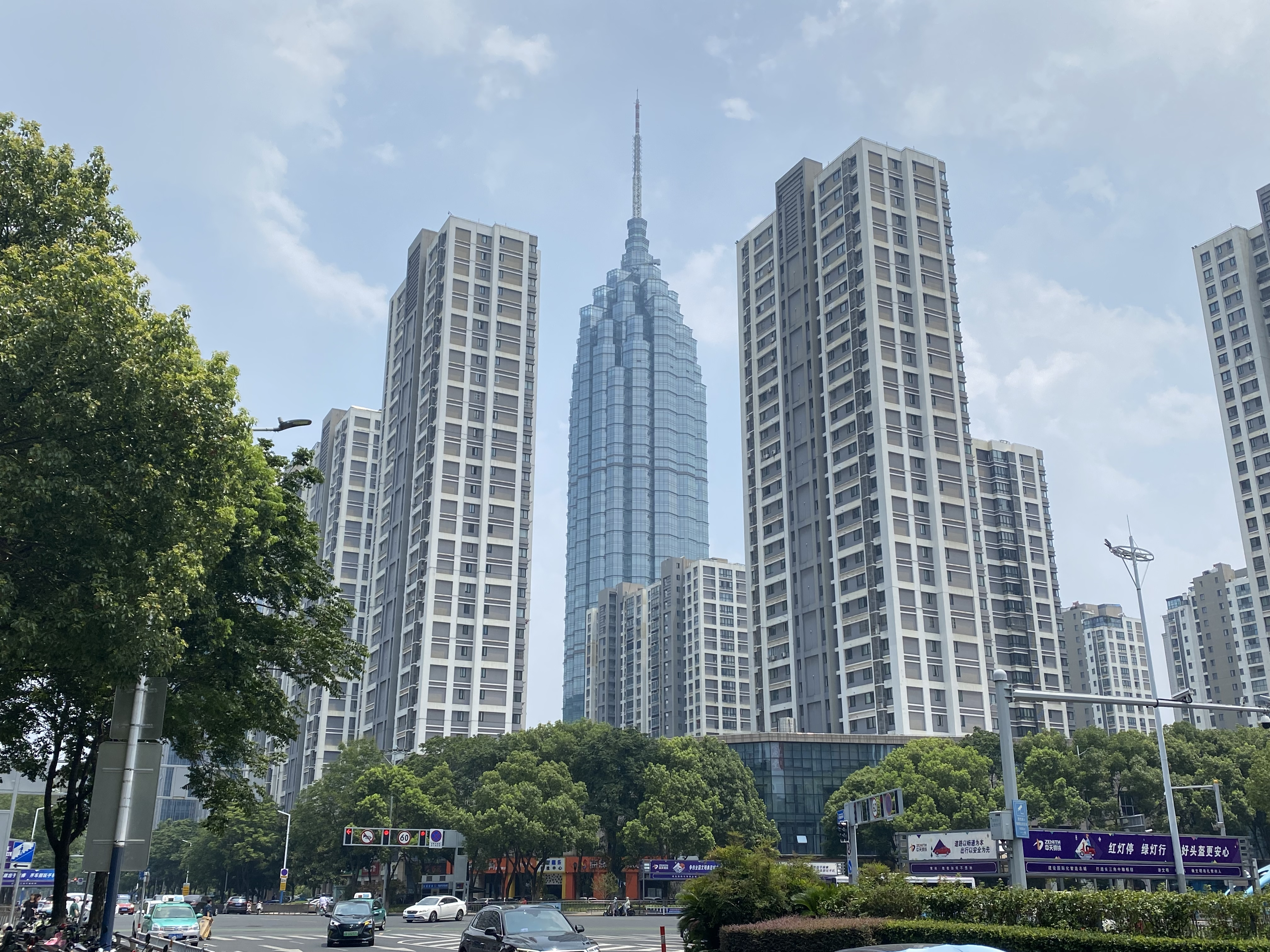
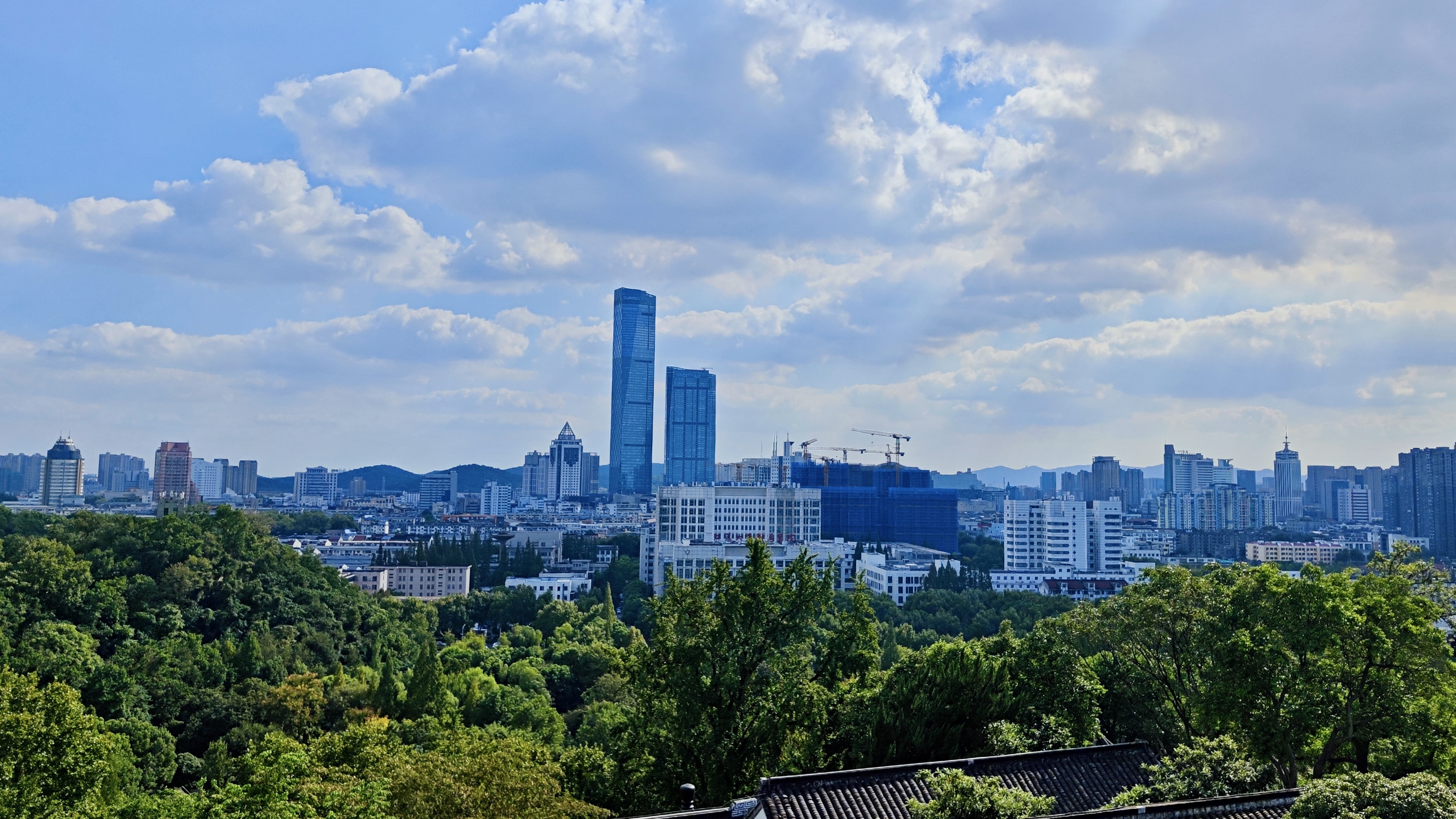
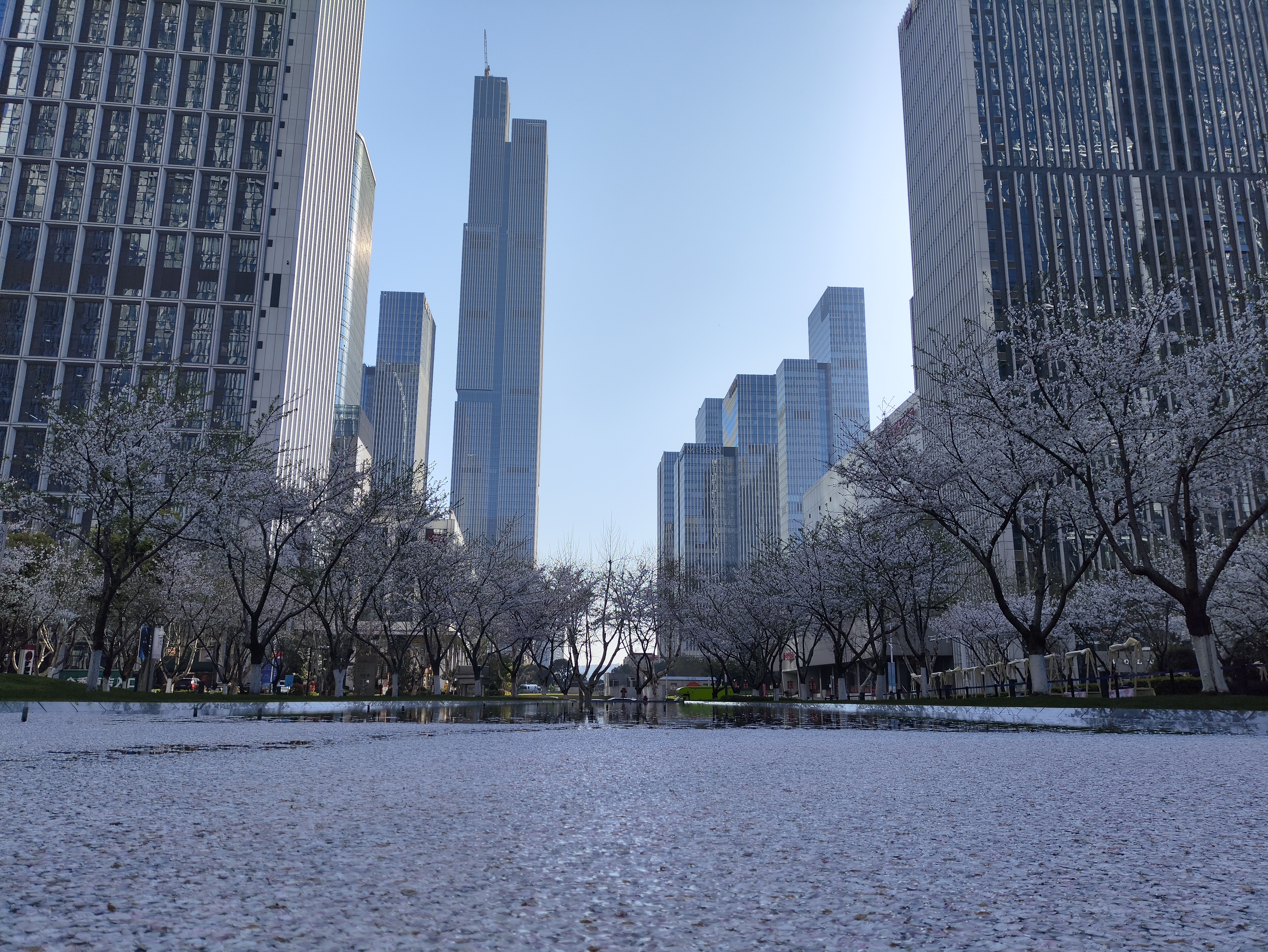
- From top left: Gate to the East in Suzhou; Taihu Square in Wuxi; Changzhou skyline; central Zhenjiang; and cityscape in Nanjing
- Country: China
- Province: Jiangsu
- Prefecture-level cities: Suzhou; Wuxi; Changzhou; Zhenjiang; Nanjing

Area
  - Total: 28,000 km^{2} (11,000 sq mi)

Population (2025)
  - Total: 38,862,300
  - Density: 1,400/km^{2} (3,600/sq mi)
- Year-end permanent population

GDP
  - Total: CN¥8.079 trillion (US$1.131 trillion) (2025)
  - Per capita: ≈CN¥207,900 (≈US$29,100)
- Time zone: UTC+8 (CST)

Southern Jiangsu (traditional Chinese: 蘇南; simplified Chinese: 苏南; pinyin: Sūnán) is a geographical and cultural region of the province of Jiangsu, China, contrasted with Central Jiangsu and Northern Jiangsu. Since 2002, it has been officially defined as comprising the five prefecture-level cities of Suzhou, Wuxi, Changzhou, Zhenjiang, and Nanjing in the south of Jiangsu. On 25 April 2013, the National Development and Reform Commission announced the Southern Jiangsu Modernization Demonstration Zone Plan, China's first regional plan centered on modernization.

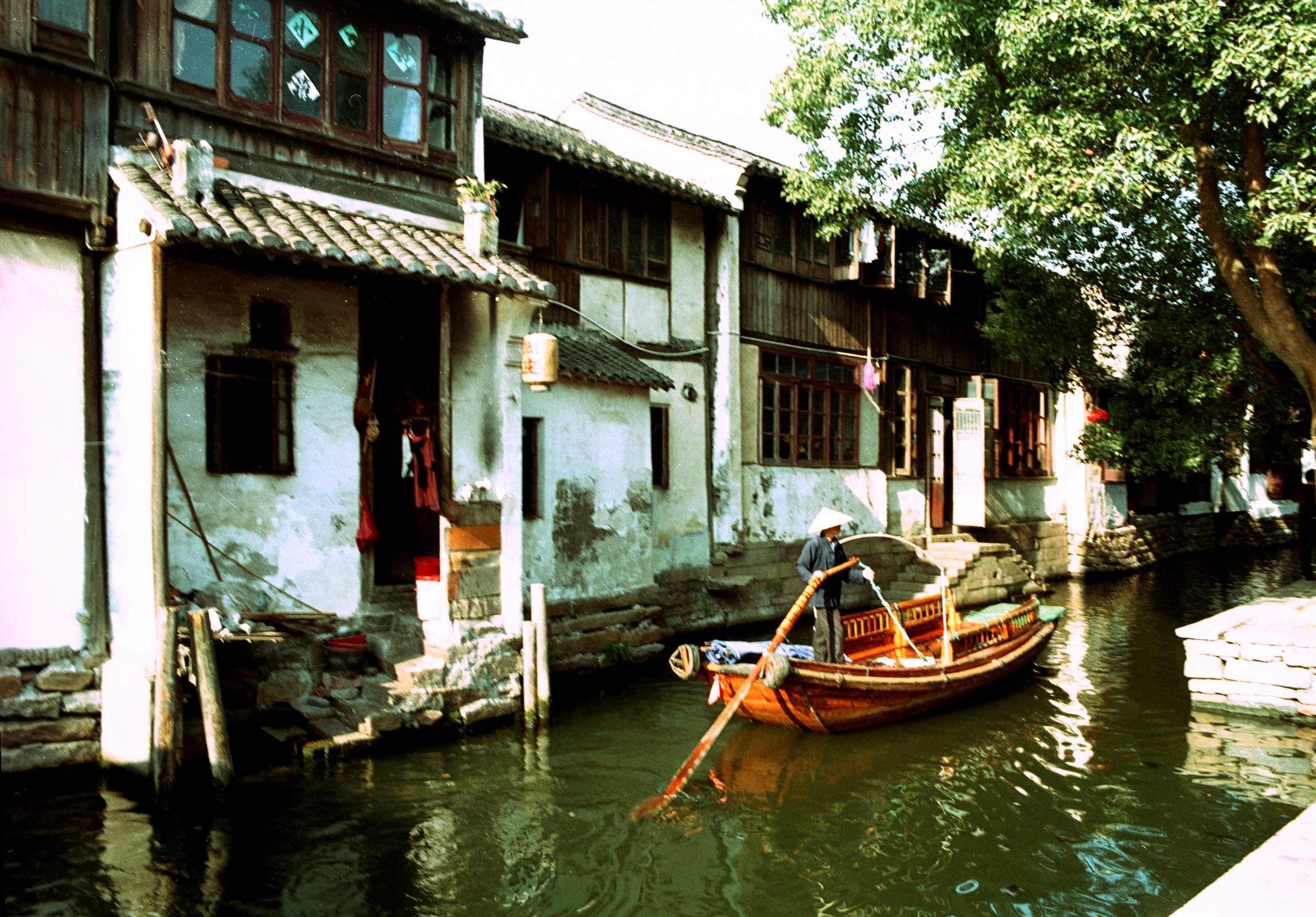
A water town in Southern Jiangsu

== Geography ==
The terrain of Southern Jiangsu is generally extremely flat in the east and center, where it forms part of the broad Lake Tai Plain. Isolated hills are scattered around Lake Tai, including Mount Hui in Wuxi, which rises to 328 m. The western part of the region, around Nanjing and Zhenjiang, is more hilly and includes Purple Mountain in Nanjing, at 448 m, and the Maoshan Mountains, which reach 372 m.

Most of Southern Jiangsu contains a dense network of rivers and canals, especially the eastern Lake Tai Plain. The region has numerous lakes, including Lake Tai, Yangcheng Lake, Gucheng Lake, and Ge Lake. Lake Tai was for a long period China's third-largest freshwater lake; as the areas of Dongting Lake and Poyang Lake have decreased over time, Lake Tai has become China's largest freshwater lake.

== History ==
Historically, the territories on the northern and southern banks of the Yangtze River within present-day Jiangsu generally belonged to different administrative divisions before the Ming dynasty. During the Northern Song dynasty, Suzhou, Changzhou (corresponding to present-day Changzhou and Wuxi), Runzhou (present-day Zhenjiang and parts of Nanjing), and Xiuzhou (present-day Shanghai and Jiaxing) in Southern Jiangsu belonged to Liangzhe Circuit, while Jiangning (present-day Nanjing) belonged to Jiangnan East Circuit. Northern Jiangsu belonged to Huainan East Circuit.

During the Yuan dynasty, Southern Jiangsu, such defined as to be the part of Jiangsu south of the Yangtze, belonged to Jiangzhe Province, while northern Jiangsu belonged to Henan Jiangbei Province.

During the Ming dynasty, northern and Southern Jiangsu were both incorporated into Nanzhili.

After Jiangsu was established as a province during the Qing dynasty, the province was on several occasions administered separately on the northern and southern sides of the Yangtze.

In 1645, the second year of the Shunzhi Emperor, the Qing government reorganized Nanjing (Nanzhili) as Jiangnan Province, whose territory roughly encompassed the present-day provinces of Jiangsu and Anhui and the municipality of Shanghai. Left and right provincial administration commissioners were established at Jiangning (present-day Nanjing), with the left commissioner senior to the right. Their offices, responsible for provincial administration and taxation, were located at Dagongfang, at present-day 128 Zhanyuan Road.

In 1661, the eighteenth year of the Shunzhi Emperor, the right provincial administration commissioner moved from Jiangning to Suzhou and administered five prefectures, including Jiangning, covering Southern Jiangsu and the Shanghai area. The left provincial administration commissioner remained in Jiangning and administered nine prefectures, including Huai'an, covering what is now northern Jiangsu and parts of Anhui.

Near the end of the Qing dynasty, the office of the governor of Jianghuai was briefly established at Qingjiangpu in Huai'an, alongside the governor of Jiangsu based in Suzhou.

During the Republic of China, Jiangsu was no longer divided administratively between north and south. The provincial capital was Nanjing from 1912 to 1929 and Zhenjiang from 1929 to 1949. Nanjing again became the national capital in 1927.

During the Wang Jingwei regime, however, the capital of Jiangsu province was moved to Suzhou, and the territory actually under its administration was limited to areas south of the Yangtze. Nanjing served as the capital during the Japanese occupation.

From 1949 to 1952, the Chinese Communist Party separately established the Sunan Administrative Region, headquartered in Wuxi, and the Subei Administrative Region, headquartered in Yangzhou, under the East China administrative region.

The Subei Administrative Region did not include the present-day urban area of Xuzhou, Tongshan County, Pizhou, Donghai County, Feng County, Pei County, Xuyi County, or Sihong County.

== Culture ==
In eastern and central Southern Jiangsu, most of Suzhou, Wuxi, and Changzhou lies within the Wu Chinese-speaking region, except for some areas along the Yangtze and most of the former Jintan county-level city under Changzhou, where Lower Yangtze Mandarin is spoken. Danyang, the southeastern part of Dantu District in Zhenjiang, and the former Gaochun County in Nanjing also belong to the Wu-speaking region. Most of Nanjing, with the exception of Gaochun, as well as the urban area of Zhenjiang and the county-level cities of Jurong and Yangzhong, belong to the Lower Yangtze Mandarin-speaking region.

Zhenjiang forms a transitional zone between the two language groups. Historically, it belonged to the Wu-speaking region. Following the southward migration of northern Chinese populations during the Disaster of Yongjia and subsequent waves of migration from northern China, the varieties spoken in urban areas along the Yangtze gradually shifted toward Lower Yangtze Mandarin varieties similar to the Yangzhou dialect, while Wu varieties continued to be spoken in areas southeast of the urban center, including Dantu and Danyang. Nanjing underwent a similar process, but because it repeatedly served as a national capital, migration from northern China had a greater influence there and its local speech became correspondingly more "northern" in character.

Major forms of local opera and narrative performance in Southern Jiangsu include Wuxi opera and Suzhou pingtan.

== Economy ==
Southern Jiangsu is the most economically developed region of Jiangsu and is among the fastest-growing and most economically developed regions of China.

In November 2006, the National Bureau of Statistics published its list of the "2006 Top 100 Counties (County-level Cities) in China", calculated using indicators of overall economic and social development. Seven of the top ten places were in Jiangsu: Kunshan ranked first, Zhangjiagang third, Jiangyin fourth, Changshu sixth, Wujin eighth, and Taicang and Wujiang were tied for ninth. In the 2009 list of the "Top 100 Counties (County-level Cities) in China", Jiangyin, Kunshan, Zhangjiagang, and Changshu were tied for first place, followed by Wujiang in fifth, Taicang in seventh, and Yixing in ninth. Wujin was no longer included in the ranking because it had been reorganized as an urban district of Changzhou.

On 19 February 2013, Lishui and Gaochun in Nanjing were converted from counties into urban districts. Since then, Southern Jiangsu has contained no counties, only county-level cities and urban districts.

== Transportation ==
Southern Jiangsu, particularly the Lake Tai Plain, is one of China's most highly developed regions for inland water transport, with an extremely dense network of waterways. The Yangtze River and the Beijing–Hangzhou Grand Canal form the principal routes. Towns and cities in the region were traditionally built along rivers and canals.

Rail transport emerged in the early 20th century, near the end of the reign of the Guangxu Emperor, with the Shanghai–Nanjing railway running across Southern Jiangsu. Since the 1990s, Jiangsu has developed an extensive expressway network.

== See also ==
- Jiangsu, Jiangnan Province, Nanzhili
- Northern Jiangsu, Central Jiangsu
- Anhui, Shanghai, Northern Zhejiang
- Yangtze River Delta
