= Shiqiu station =

Nanjing Metro station

Shiqiu 石湫
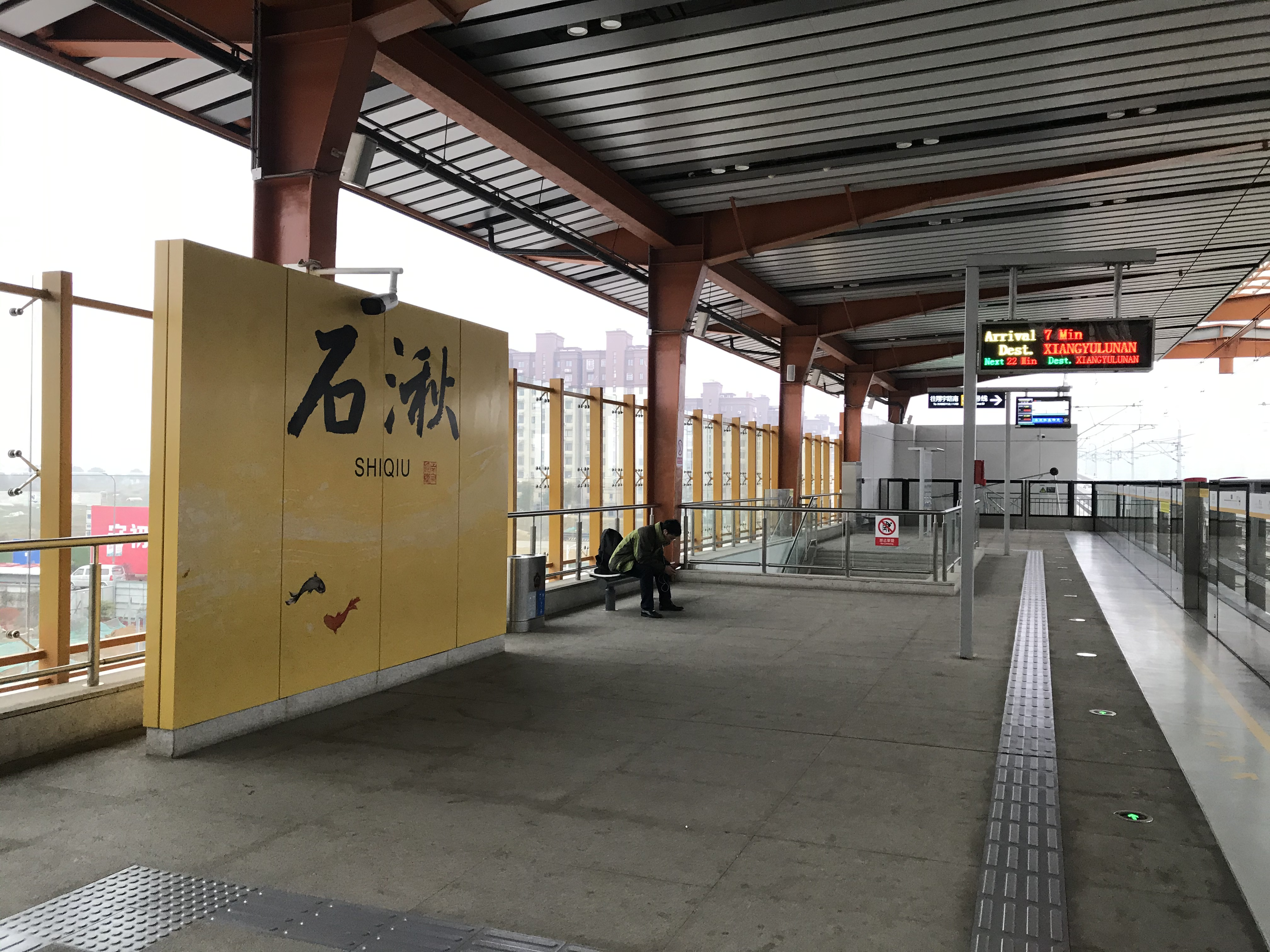

General information
- Location: Lishui District, Nanjing, Jiangsu; China
- Coordinates: 31.6425°N 118.9024°E
- Operated by: Nanjing Metro Co. Ltd.
- Line: Line S9

History
- Opened: 30 December 2017

Services
Preceding station	Nanjing Metro	Following station
Tongshan towards Xiangyulunan	Line S9	Mingjue towards Gaochun
Location

Shiqiu station (Chinese: 石湫站) is a station of Line S9 of the Nanjing Metro. It started operations on 30 December 2017.
