= Mingjue station =

Nanjing Metro station

Mingjue 明觉
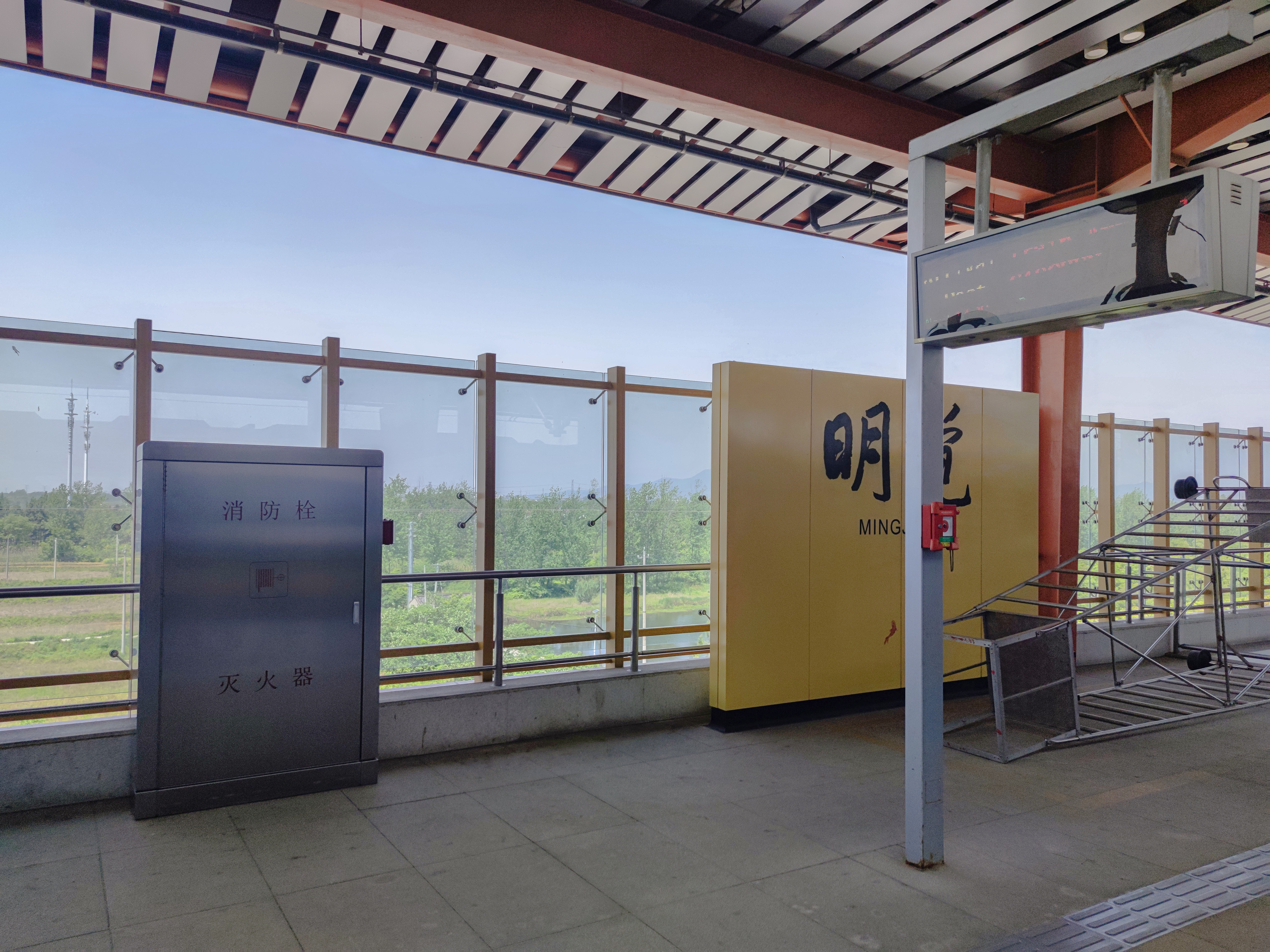

General information
- Location: Jiangning District, Nanjing, Jiangsu; China
- Coordinates: 31.5486°N 118.8971°E
- Operated by: Nanjing Metro Co. Ltd.
- Line: Line S9

History
- Opened: 30 December 2017

Services
Preceding station	Nanjing Metro	Following station
Shijiao towards Xiangyulunan	Line S9	Tuanjiewei towards Gaochun
Location

Mingjue station (Chinese: 明觉站) is a station of Line S9 of the Nanjing Metro. It started operations on 30 December 2017.
