= Line S9 (Nanjing Metro) =

Metro line in Nanjing, China

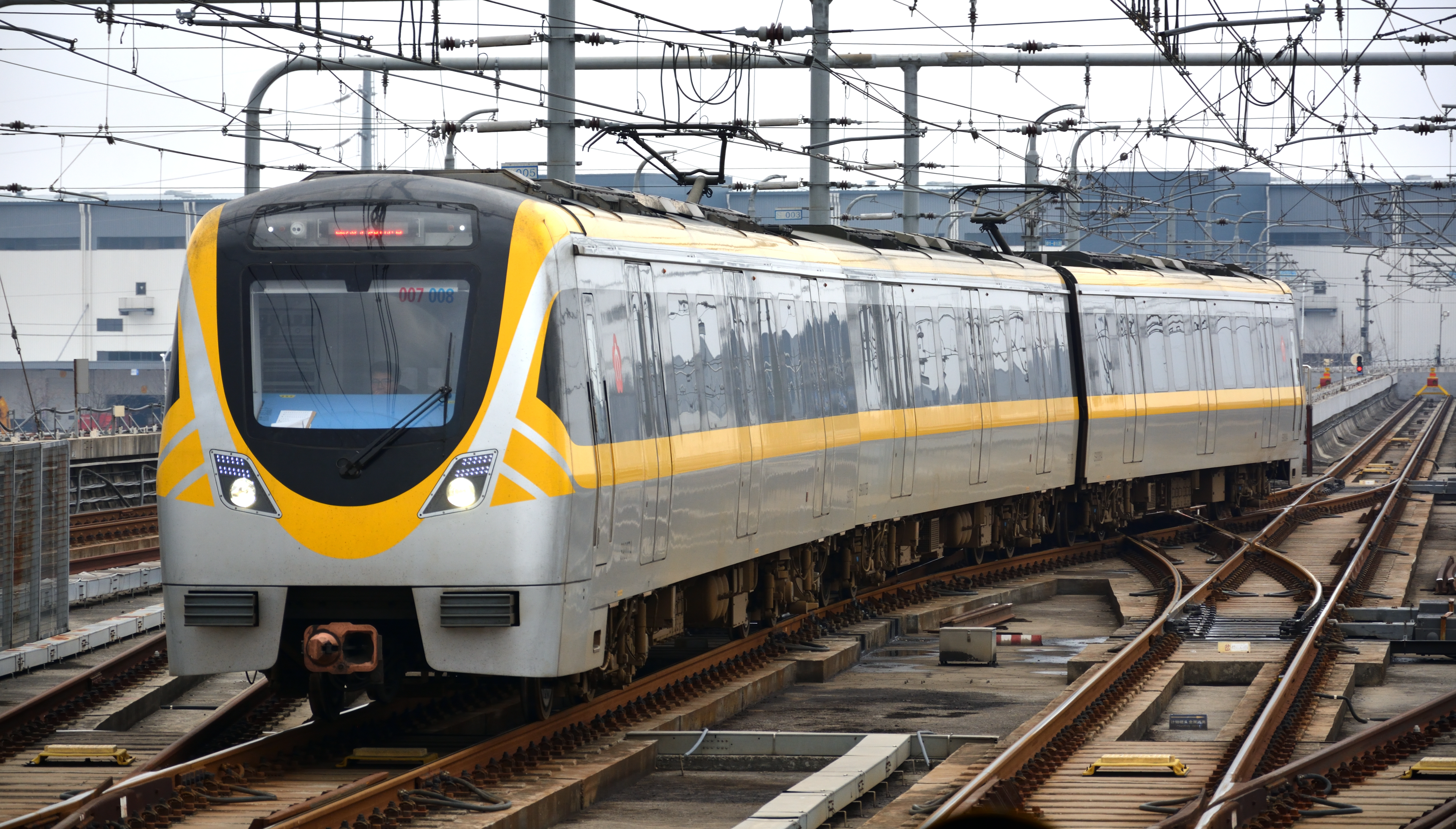
- Line S9 train at Xiangyulunan station

Overview
- Other names: Gaochun line; Nanjing–Gaochun intercity railway Phase 2; Ninggao intercity railway Phase 2 (Note: "Ning" (宁), is the standard Chinese abbreviation for Nanjing. It comes from the name "Jiangning" (江宁) that the city had in the early Qing.); Ninggao Line
- Status: In operation
- Locale: Jiangning, Lishui, and Gaochun districts Nanjing, Jiangsu
- Termini: Xiangyulunan; Gaochun
- Stations: 6

Service
- Type: Rapid transit
- Operator: Nanjing Metro

History
- Opened: 30 December 2017; 8 years ago

Technical
- Line length: 52.4 km (32.6 mi)
- Number of tracks: 2
- Character: Elevated
- Track gauge: 1,435 mm (4 ft 8 1/2 in)

Line S9 is a north–south suburban metro line in the Nanjing Metro (Chinese: 南京地铁S9号线; pinyin: Nánjīng Dìtiě S-Jiǔ Hào Xiàn) system, which opened on December 30, 2017. It connects to Line S1 at Xiangyulunan and crosses Shijiu Lake on a 12 km (7.5 mi) long bridge between Mingjue and Tuanjiewei.

Line S9 also serves as the second stage of the Nanjing–Gaochun Intercity Railway, with Line S1 serving as the first stage. In June 2019 a few express trains started operating during rush hour, running non-stop between Xiangyulunan and Gaochun.

== Opening timetable ==
Segment	Commencement	Length	Station(s)	Name
Xiangyulunan — Gaochun	30 December 2017	52.4 km (32.56 mi)	6	Ninggao ICR Phase 2

== Station list ==
Services		Station Name		Connections	Distance km		Location
L	Ex	English	Chinese	Connections	Distance km		Location
●	●	Xiangyulunan	翔宇路南	S1	0.000	0.000	Jiangning
●	|	Tongshan	铜山		10.003	10.003	Jiangning
●	|	Shiqiu	石湫		7.374	17.377	Lishui
●	|	Mingjue	明觉		11.219	28.596	Lishui
●	|	Tuanjiewei	团结圩		16.912	45.508	Gaochun
●	●	Gaochun	高淳		6.232	51.740	Gaochun

== Rolling Stock ==
Line S9 uses car Class B aluminum alloy trains with a maximum service speed of 120 km/h (75 mph). The train cars are 2.8 meters (9 ft 2 in) wide with a transverse 2+2 seating layout, with 151 seats and a capacity of 441 people. Unlike most Class B metro trains, each car only has 3 doors per side instead of 4, owing to the line's length and speed.
