= Tongshan station =

Metro station in Nanjing

Tongshan 铜山
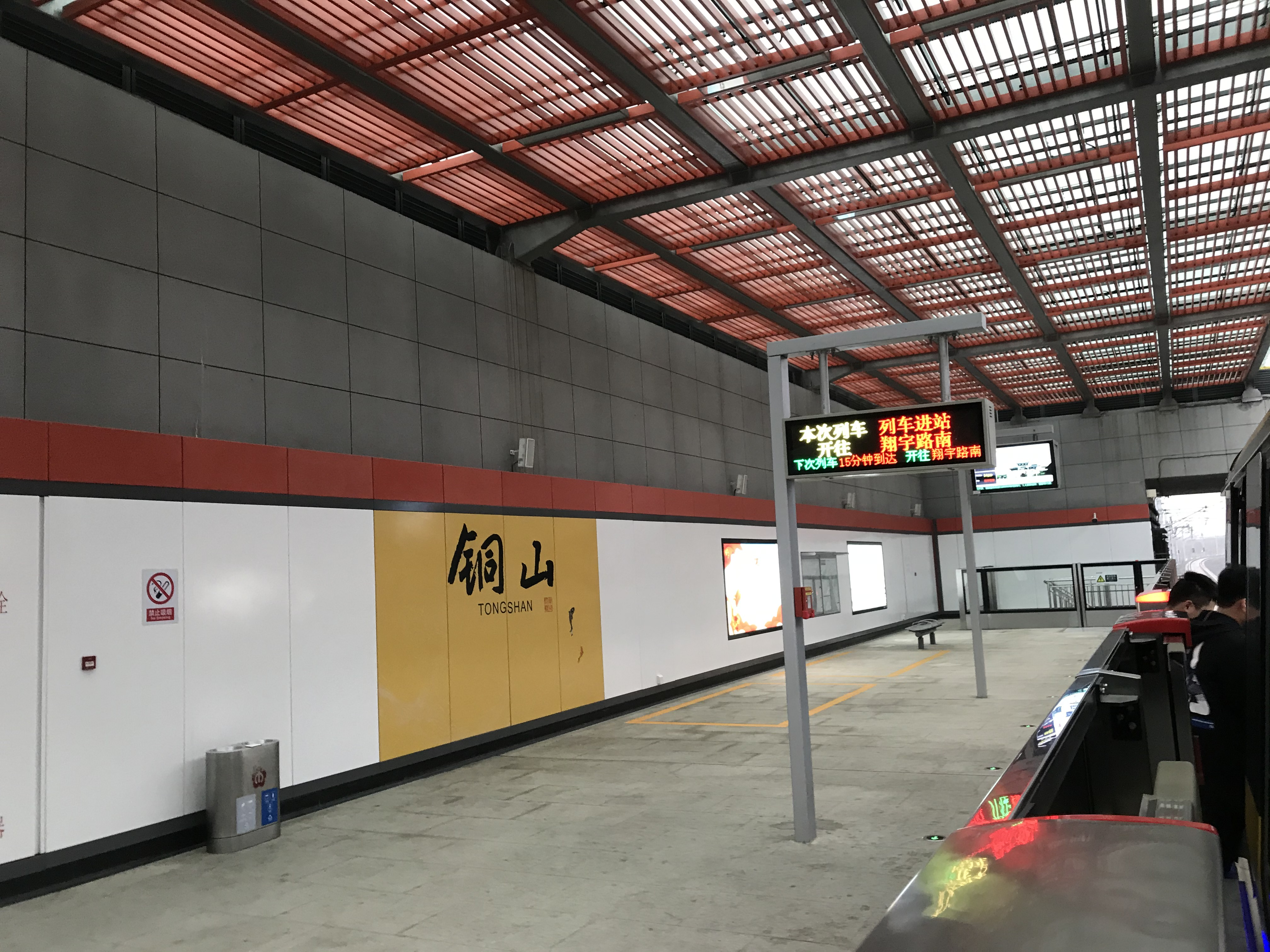

General information
- Location: Jiangning District, Nanjing, Jiangsu; China
- Operated by: Nanjing Metro Co. Ltd.
- Line: Line S9

History
- Opened: 30 December 2017

Services
Preceding station	Nanjing Metro	Following station
Xiangyulunan Terminus	Line S9	Shijiao towards Gaochun
Location

Tongshan station (Chinese: 铜山站) is a station of Line S9 of the Nanjing Metro. It started operations on 30 December 2017.
