= Jiangsu Gaochun High School =

Location
- On No.1 Zhen Xing Road, Gaochun, NanJing, China

Information
- Other name: Chinese: 省淳中
- Type: Public School
- Motto: Chinese: 淳，畅
- Established: 1923年
- Principal: Zhang Peicheng (Chinese: 张培成）
- Staff: 约300
- Grades: Four
- Enrollment: 约3000

Jiangsu Gaochun High School is located in Gaochun, Nanjing, Jiangsu, China.

== History ==
Time	Issues
1923	Built by Dong Mingxin (Chinese:董铭新) in Dong Ba Town (Chinese: 东坝镇)
1956	Renamed: Gaochun County High School (高淳县中学)
1993	Was named province key high school
1996	Junior High School was closed down
1998	Built the school in another place
1999	Renamed Jiangsu Gaochun High School
2004	Four-star middle school in Jiangsu province

== School motto ==
- School Motto: "Purity, freedom" (Chinese: 纯，畅)
- Study Motto: "Study hard, think hard, ask more, act more" (Chinese: 勤学，善思，好问，进取)
