= Gaochun Old Street =

Street in Nanjing, China

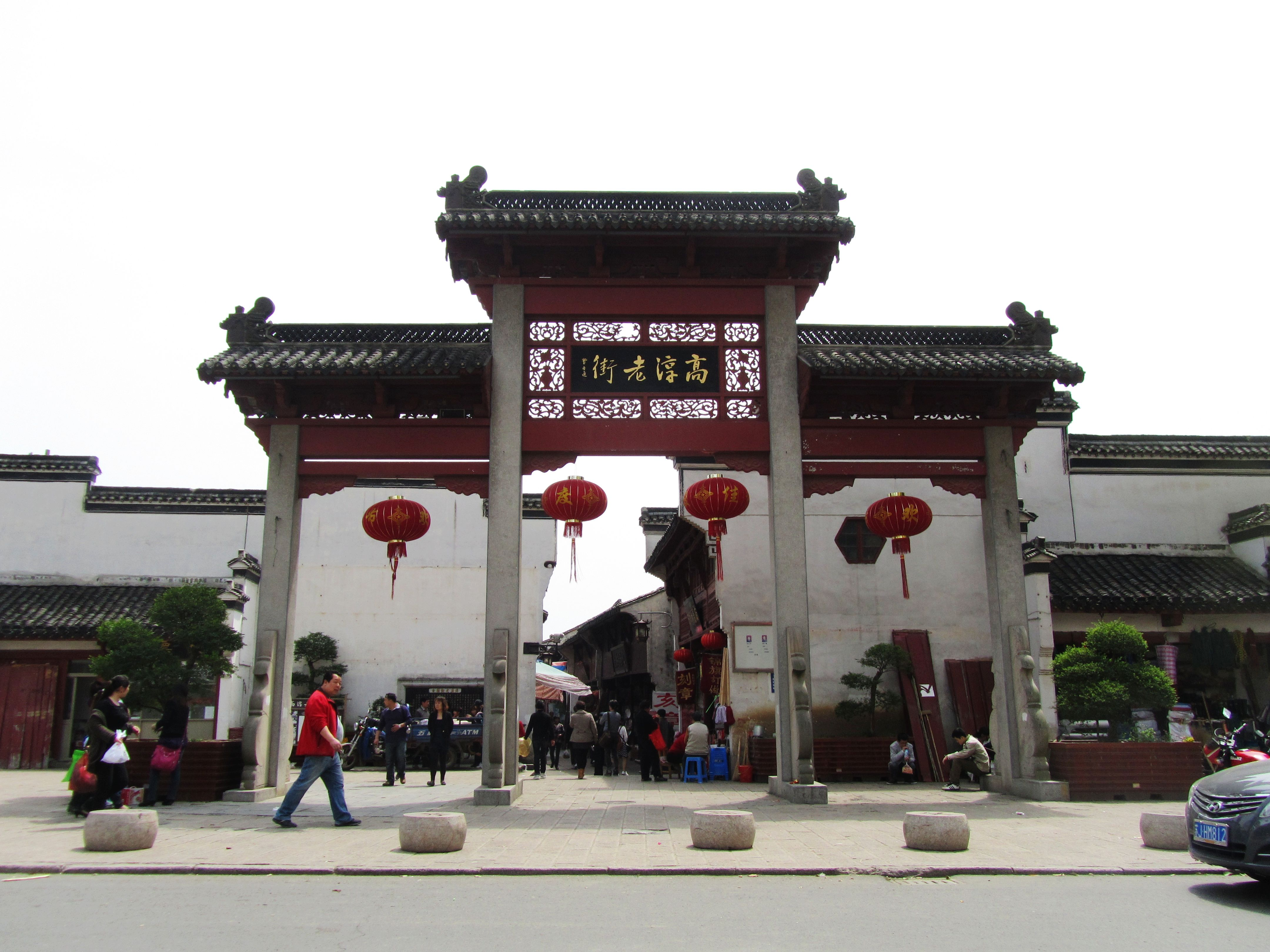
Gaochun Old Street

Gaochun Old Street (Chinese: 高淳老街) is located in Gaochun, Nanjing, in China. It is a national AAA level tourist scenic zone. It is the best-preserved old street from the Chinese Ming and Qing Dynasty in Jiangsu Province.

It has been published as a provincial heritage unit several years ago. It is called Gaochun Chunxi Old Street (Chinese: 高淳淳溪老街) as well. Gaochun has recently been named International Slow-rhythm City which means people living there lead a relatively slow and peaceful life.

Gaochun Old Street is more than 345 metres (1,132 ft) long, and 3.5 metres (11 ft) wide now. It was 800 metres (2,600 ft)long originally. The street is lined on both sides with old-styled shops selling goods and services of interest to tourists. There are also other tourist attractions such as the Qianlong Old Well (Chinese: 乾隆老井)and the Guanwang Temple (Chinese: 关王庙).
