= Yangtze Delta =

Megalopolis in East China

Yangtze Delta 长江三角洲
- Megalopolis
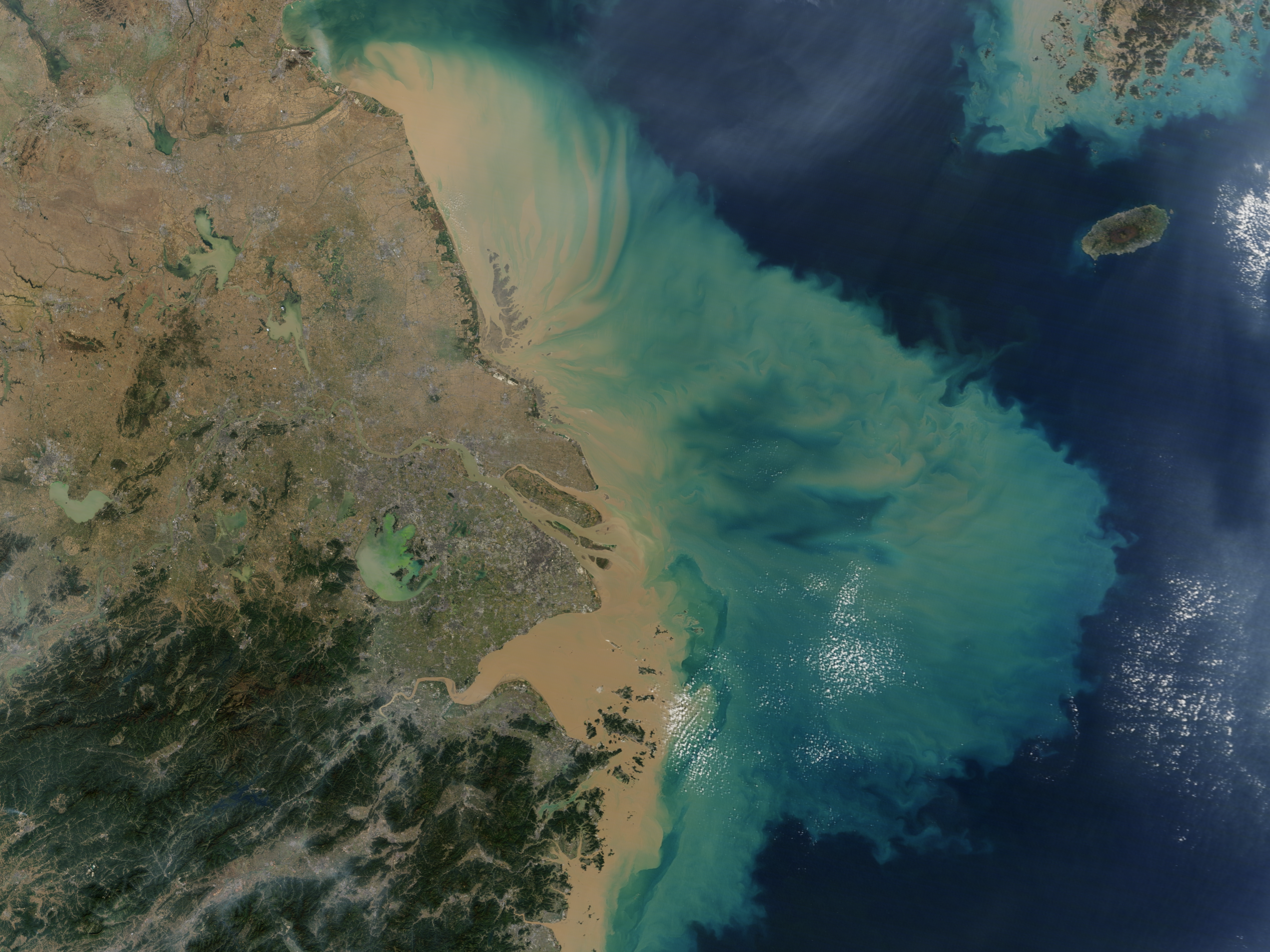
- Satellite view of Yangtze Delta and East China Sea

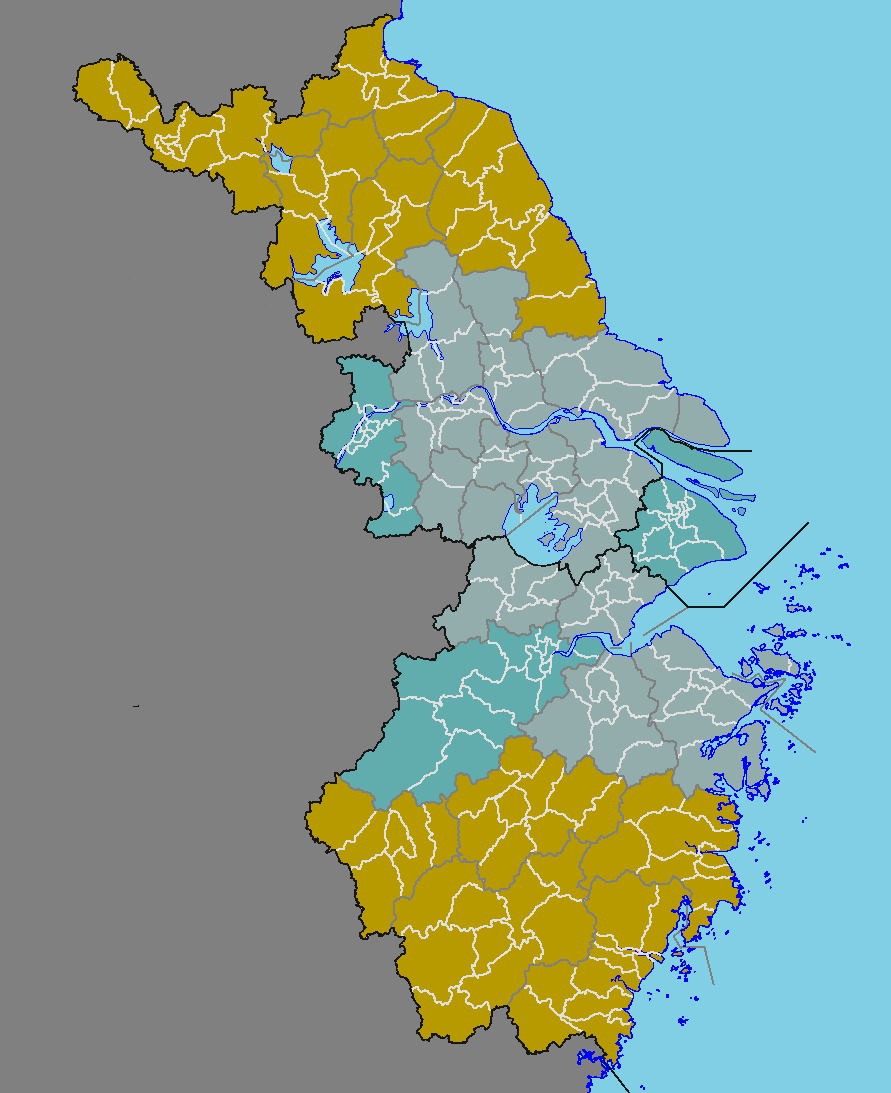
- Yangtze River Delta Economic Region (in cyan)
- Coordinates: 32.1759°N 119.4307°E
- Provincial: Shanghai; Jiangsu; Zhejiang; Anhui; Jiangxi
- Major cities: Shanghai, Nanjing, Hangzhou, Suzhou, Ningbo, Wuxi, Nantong, Shaoxing, Changzhou, Jinhua, Jiaxing, Taizhou, Yangzhou, Yancheng, Taizhou, Zhenjiang, Huzhou, Huai'an, Zhoushan, Quzhou, Jiujiang, Hefei

Government
  - Shanghai: Gong Zheng
  - Jiangsu: Xu Kunlin
  - Zhejiang: Wang Hao
  - Anhui: Wang Qingxian

Area
  - Total: 110,755 km^{2} (42,763 sq mi)

Population (2020)
  - Total: 123,295,839
  - Density: 1,113.23/km^{2} (2,883.25/sq mi)

GDP
  - Total: CN¥22.7 trillion (US$3.2 trillion) (2024)
  - Per capita: CN¥184,200 (US$25,700)
- Time zone: UTC+8 (CST)

Yangtze Delta
- Simplified Chinese: 长江三角洲
- Traditional Chinese: 長江三角洲
- Hanyu Pinyin: Chángjiāng sānjiǎozhōu
- Romanization: Zankaon Saekohtseu

The Yangtze Delta or Yangtze River Delta (YRD; Chinese: 长江三角洲; pinyin: Chángjiāng Sānjiǎozhōu or Chinese: 长三角; pinyin: Chángsānjiǎo for short), is a geographic, cultural, and economic region of China, generally considered to comprise the Direct-administered municipality of Shanghai, Southern Jiangsu, Northern Zhejiang, and parts of southern Anhui. The area lies in the heart of the historical Jiangnan region (literally meaning "south of the Yangtze"), where the Yangtze drains into the East China Sea. Historically, the fertile delta fed large populations, allowing cities and commerce to flourish. Today, it is one of China's most heavily urbanised regions, home to over 123 million people, and is sometimes considered a megalopolis, due to the number, proximity, size and interconnectedness of its urban areas. The Yangtze Delta is home to China's most important financial center, Shanghai, and is a global hub for manufacturing of varied goods ranging from textiles to vehicles. In 2024 the Yangtze Delta region had a GDP of approximately US$3.2 trillion (about the same size as France), making up approximately 17% of China's total GDP.

== History ==
The Neolithic Liangzhu culture was based in this region, and in the Eastern Zhou period it was home to the powerful states of Wu, based in Suzhou, and Yue, based in the Shaoxing area. Nanjing first served as a capital in the Three Kingdoms period as the capital of Eastern Wu (AD 229–280). In the fourth century CE the Eastern Jin dynasty (AD 317–420) moved its capital here after losing control of the north and its capital Jiankang (present-day Nanjing) became a major cultural, economic, and political hub. During the mid to late period of the Tang dynasty (618-907), the region emerged as an economic hub, and by the late Tang the Delta became the Empire's foremost important agricultural, handicraft industrial and economic hub.

Hangzhou served as the Chinese capital during the Southern Song dynasty (1127–1279). Then called Lin'an, it became the biggest city in East Asia with a population more than 1.5 million, and one of the most prosperous cities in the world, which it remained after the Mongol conquest. At the same time, Ningbo became one of the two biggest seaports in East Asia along with Quanzhou (in Fujian province). Nanjing was the early capital of the Ming dynasty (1368–1644) and the region remained the most important economic region of the empire even after the Yongle Emperor moved the capital to Beijing in 1421.

During the mid-late Ming dynasty (1368–1644), the first bud of capitalism of East Asia was born and developed in this area, although it was disrupted by the Manchu invasion and controlled strictly and carefully by the Confucian central government in Beijing, it continued its development slowly throughout the rest of the Qing dynasty (1644-1911). During the Ming and Qing dynasties, the delta again blossomed into a large socioeconomic hub.

During the Qianlong era (1735-1796) of the Qing dynasty, Shanghai began developing rapidly and became the largest port in the Far East. From late 19th century to early 20th century, Shanghai was the foremost commercial hub in the Far East. The Yangtze Delta became the first industrialized area in China. In the middle and late feudal society of China, the Yangtze River Delta region initially formed a considerable urban agglomeration.

After the reform and opening up program which began in 1978, Shanghai again became the most important economic region in Mainland China. In modern times, the Yangtze Delta metropolitan region is anchored by Shanghai, and also flanked by the major metropolitan areas of Hangzhou, Suzhou, Ningbo, and Nanjing, home to nearly 105 million people (of which an estimated 80 million are urban residents). It is the heart of China's economic development, surpassing other concentrations of metropolitan areas (including the Pearl Delta) in China in terms of economic growth, productivity and per capita income.

In 1982, the Chinese government set up the Shanghai Economic Area. Besides Shanghai, four cities in Jiangsu (Suzhou, Wuxi, Changzhou, Nantong) and five cities in Zhejiang (Hangzhou, Jiaxing, Shaoxing, Huzhou, Ningbo) were included. In 1992, a 14-city cooperative joint meeting was launched. Besides the previous 10 cities, the members included Nanjing, Zhenjiang and Yangzhou in Jiangsu, and Zhoushan in Zhejiang. In 1997, the regular joint meeting resulted in the establishment of the Yangtze Delta Economic Coordination Association, which included a new member Taizhou in Jiangsu in that year. In 1997, Taizhou in Zhejiang also joined the association. In 2003, the association accepted six new members after a six-year observation and review, including Yancheng and Huai'an in Jiangsu, Jinhua and Quzhou in Zhejiang, and Ma'anshan and Hefei in Anhui. In 2019, the area expanded to include the entirety of Anhui, Jiangsu, Zhejiang, and Shanghai.

== Demographics ==
The Yangtze Delta area is one of the most densely populated regions on earth, and includes one of the world's largest cities on its banks — Shanghai, with a density of 2,700 inhabitants per square kilometre (7,000/sq mi). Because of the large population of the delta, and factories, farms, and other cities upriver, the World Wide Fund for Nature says the Yangtze Delta is the biggest cause of marine pollution in the Pacific Ocean.

Most of the people in this region speak Wu Chinese (sometimes called Shanghainese, although Shanghainese is actually one of the dialects within the Wu group of Chinese) as their mother tongue, in addition to Mandarin. Wu is mutually unintelligible with other varieties of Chinese, including Mandarin.

== Geography ==
=== Metropolitan areas ===
Metropolitan area	Chinese	Cities	Population
Greater Shanghai Metropolitan Area	上海大都市圈	Shanghai	
Nanjing Metropolitan Area	南京都市圈	Nanjing	
Hangzhou Metropolitan Area	杭州都市圈	Hangzhou	
Suxichang Metropolitan Area	苏锡常都市圈	Suzhou, Wuxi, Changzhou	
Hefei Metropolitan area	合肥都市圈	Hefei	
Ningbo Metropolitan Area	宁波都市圈	Ningbo	

=== Cities ===
Central areas include Shanghai, Nanjing, Jiujiang, Wuxi, Changzhou, Suzhou, Nantong, Yangzhou, Zhenjiang, Yancheng, Taizhou (Jiangsu), Hangzhou, Ningbo, Wenzhou, Huzhou, Jiaxing, Shaoxing, Jinhua, Zhoushan, Taizhou (Zhejiang), Hefei, Wuhu, Maanshan, Tongling, Anqing, Chuzhou, Chizhou, Xuancheng.

City	Area km^{2}	Population (2020)	GDP 2024 (CN¥)	GDP 2024 (US$)
Shanghai	6,341	24,870,895	CN¥ 5,393 billion	US$757.2 billion
Suzhou	8,488	12,748,252	CN¥ 2,673 billion	US$375.3 billion
Hangzhou	16,821	11,936,010	CN¥ 2,186 billion	US$306.9 billion
Nanjing	6,587	9,314,685	CN¥ 1,850 billion	US$259.8 billion
Ningbo	9,816	9,618,000	CN¥ 1,815 billion	US$254.8 billion
Wuxi	4,628	7,462,135	CN¥ 1,626 billion	US$228.4 billion
Nantong	8,544	7,726,635	CN¥ 1,242 billion	US$174.4 billion
Changzhou	4,385	5,278,121	CN¥ 1,081 billion	US$151.8 billion
Shaoxing	8,279	5,270,977	CN¥ 839 billion	US$117.5 billion
Yangzhou	6,626	4,559,797	CN¥ 781 billion	US$109.7 billion
Jiaxing	4,009	5,400,868	CN¥ 757 billion	US$106.3 billion
Taizhou (Jiangsu)	5,787	4,512,762	CN¥ 702 billion	US$98.6 billion
Taizhou (Zhejiang)	9,411	6,662,888	CN¥ 666 billion	US$93.5 billion
Zhenjiang	3,837	3,210,418	CN¥ 554 billion	US$75.9 billion
Huzhou	5,818	3,367,579	CN¥ 320 billion	US$41.1 billion
Zhoushan	1,378	1,157,817	CN¥ 223 billion	US$17.6 billion
Yangtze River Delta; Economic Region	110,755	123,295,839	CN¥ 22.708 trillion	US$3.169 trillion

== Geology ==
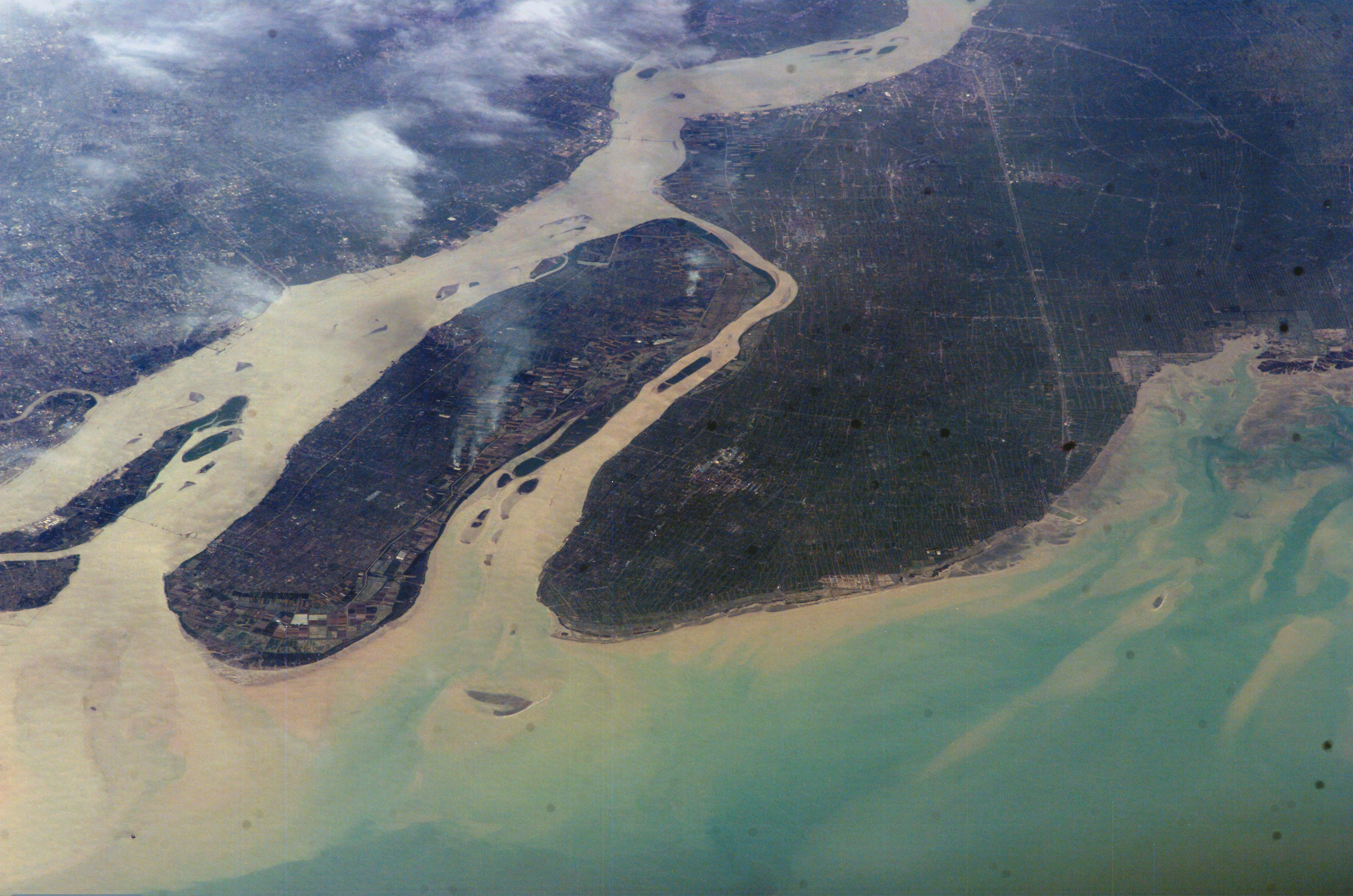
Mouth of Yangtze River, Chongming Island and Huangpu River can be seen clearly

=== Coastal erosion ===
The Three Gorges Dam has huge impacts on both upstream and downstream. Since 2003, the Yangtze River delta front has experienced severe erosion and significant sediment coarsening.

=== Subaqueous delta ===
The Yangtze River derived sediment has not really dispersed across the East China Sea continental shelf, instead, an elongated (~800 km) distal subaqueous mud wedge (up to 60 m thick) extending from the Yangtze River mouth southward off the Zhejiang and Fujian coasts into the Taiwan Strait.

== Culture ==
The Yangtze River Delta is both a geographical and a socio-economic region, characterised by shared or similar cultural traditions and historical experiences. Distinct regional cultures, such as Hui, Huaiyang, Wuyue, Shanghai-style, and Chu-Han, each retain their own identities while also influencing and merging with one another, contributing to the diverse culture of the Delta. The region's rich cultural heritage has played a role in supporting its economic development, helping it become one of China's most economically dynamic areas, with high levels of openness and innovation.

== Economy ==
The area of the Yangtze Delta incorporates more than twenty relatively developed cities in three provinces. The term can be generally used to refer to the entire region extending as far north as Lianyungang, Jiangsu and as far south as Wenzhou, Zhejiang.

=== Fishing and agriculture ===
The Yangtze Delta contains the most fertile soils in all of China. Rice is the dominant crop of the delta, but further inland fishing rivals it. In Qing Pu, 50 ponds, containing five different species of fish, produce 29,000 tons of fish each year. One of the biggest fears of fish farmers in this region is that toxic water will seep into their man-made lagoons and threaten their livelihood.

== Governance ==
Yangtze Delta regional cooperation requires effort from governments of Shanghai, Zhejiang, Jiangsu, Anhui and Jiangxi.

They've gradually established a three-tier model of governance on increased regional cooperation:

- Leadership: Symposium of Governors of YRD Area (长三角地区主要领导座谈会)
- Coordination: Joint Conference on Cooperation and Development of YRD Area (长三角地区合作与发展联席会议)
- Operation:
  - Offices of the Joint Conference (联席会议办公室)
  - Office of YRD Regional Cooperation (长三角区域合作办公室)
    - Specialized Task Forces (专题合作组)

There is also a conference with longer history for economical cooperation:

- Coordinative Conference on Economy for Cities in YRD (长三角城市经济协调会, since 1992)
  - Joint Conference of Mayors (市长联席会议)
  - Office of the Coordination Society (协调会办公室)

=== Plans ===
- Outline of the Regional Integration Development Plan of the Yangtze River Delta

== Transportation ==
The region has a well-developed transport infrastructure, with one of the highest rates of private vehicle ownership in China. Traffic regulations in Jiangsu, Shanghai, and Zhejiang are also comparatively stricter than in other parts of the country. Major shipping and trade hubs, such as the Port of Shanghai and the Port of Ningbo-Zhoushan, are located here; these ports are the largest in the world for container and cargo handling, respectively. The area is also home to the Hangzhou Bay Bridge, the world's longest cross-sea bridge at 36 km, and has the densest network of rapid transit railways, spanning 12 lines.

== Climate ==
Shanghai

Climate chart (precipitation, max. and min. temperature)
J	F	M	A	M	J	J	A	S	O	N	D
51 8 1	57 9 2	99 13 6	89 19 11	102 24 16	170 28 21	156 32 25	158 31 25	137 27 21	63 23 15	46 17 9	37 11 3
- █ Average max. and min. temperatures in °C
- █ Precipitation totals in mm
Imperial conversion
J	F	M	A	M	J	J	A	S	O	N	D
2 47 34	2.2 49 36	3.9 55 42	3.5 66 52	4 75 61	6.7 82 69	6.2 89 77	6.2 88 77	5.4 81 69	2.5 73 59	1.8 63 48	1.5 52 37
- █ Average max. and min. temperatures in °F
- █ Precipitation totals in inches

The Yangtze Delta has a marine monsoon subtropical climate, with hot and humid summers, cool and dry winters, and warm spring and fall. Winter temperatures can drop as low as -10 °C (a record), however, and even in springtime, large temperature fluctuations can occur.

== See also ==
- Pearl River Delta
- Yellow River Delta
