= Northern Zhejiang =

Region of Zhejiang, China

Northern Zhejiang 浙北
- Region
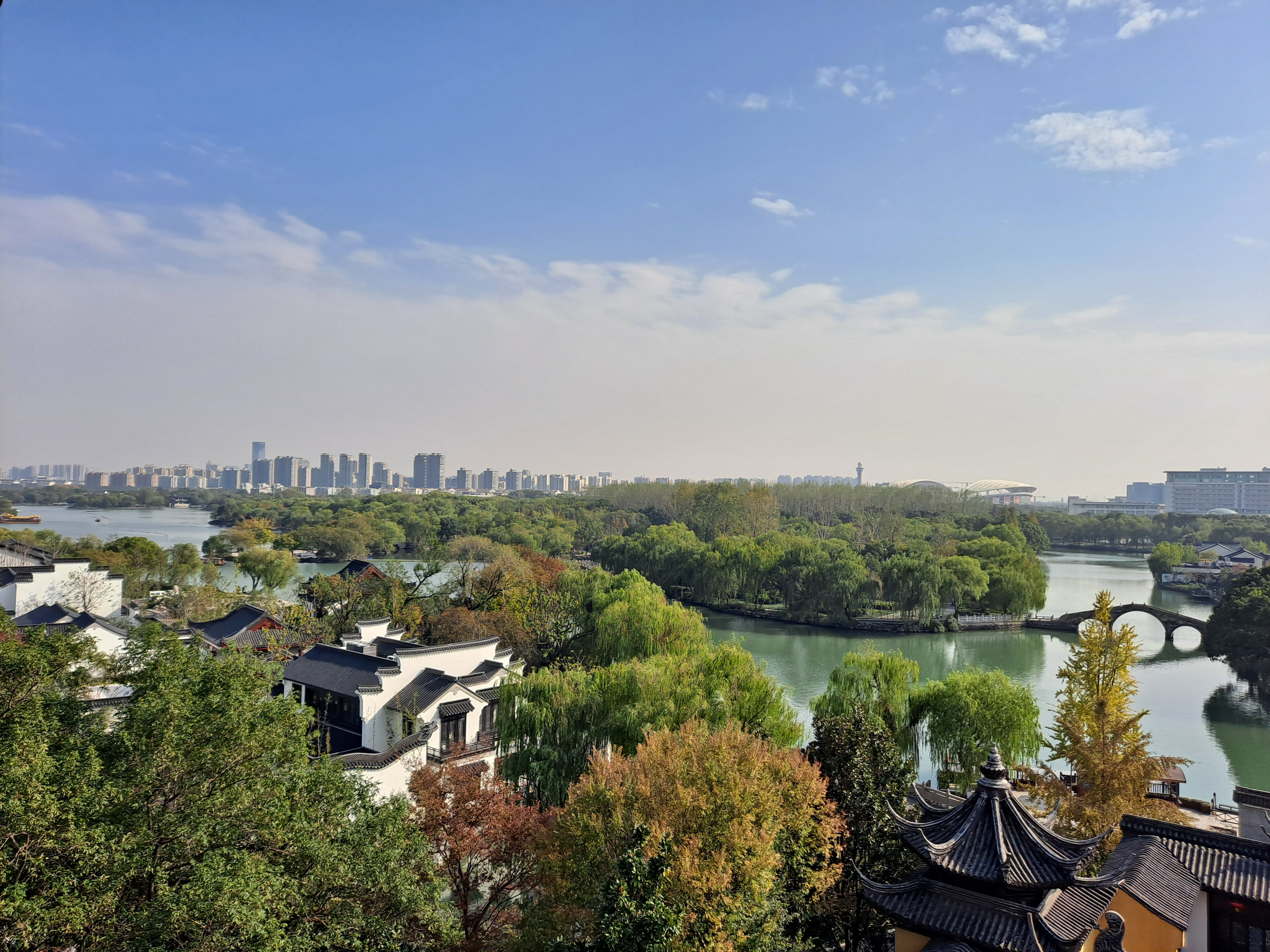
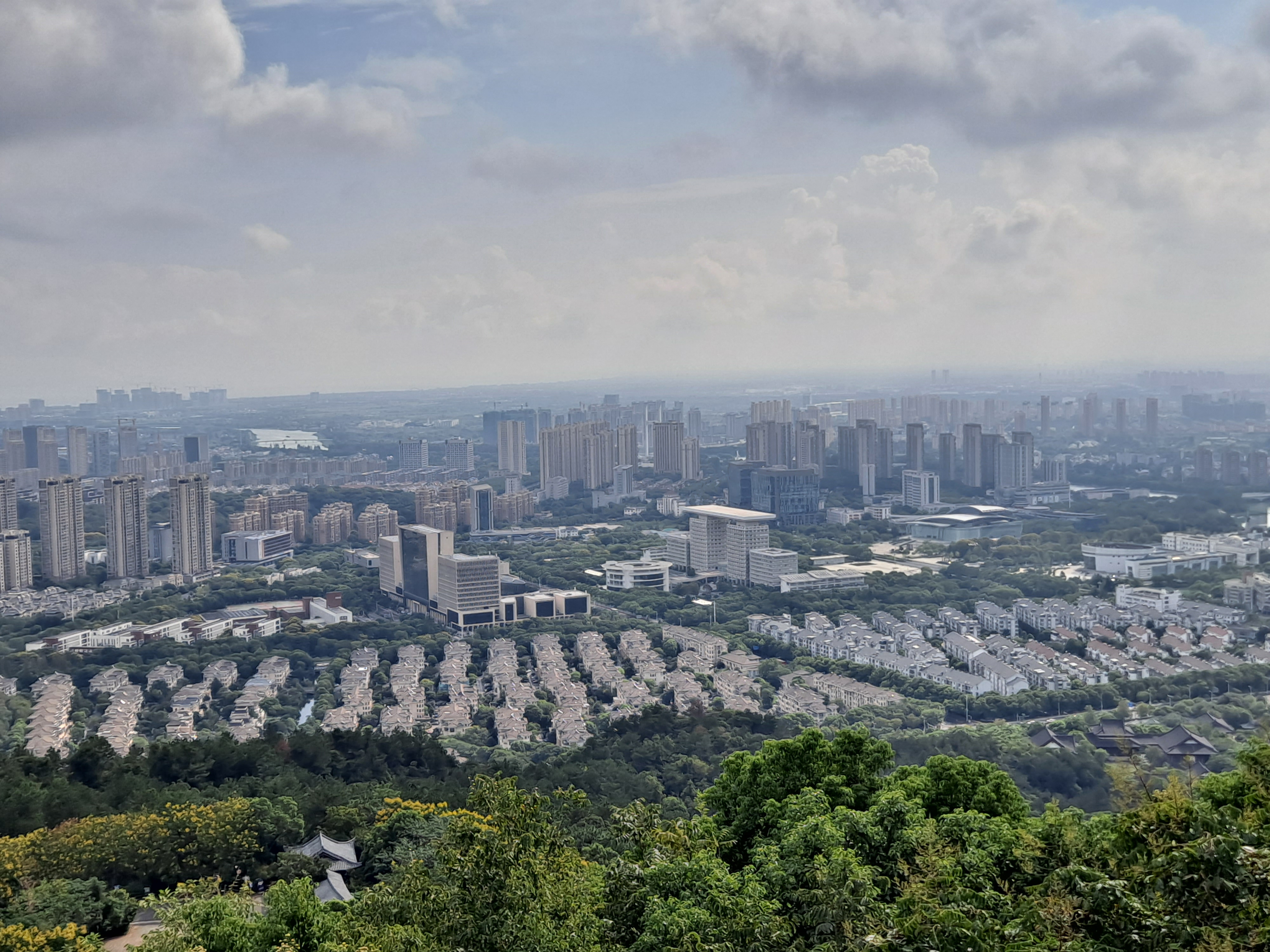
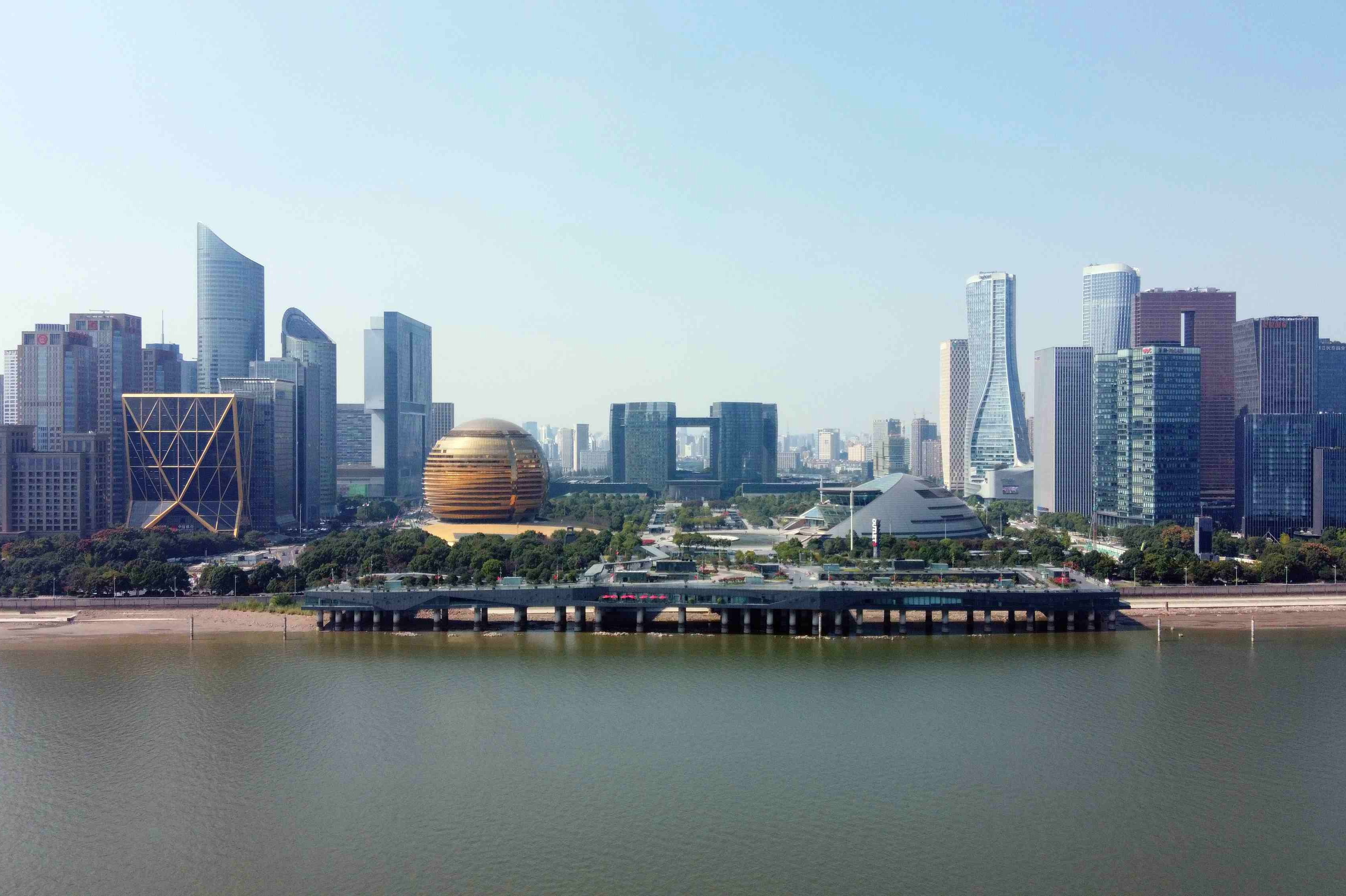
- From top left: Jiaxing viewed from Haogu Pagoda; Huzhou viewed from Renhuang Mountain; and Qianjiang New City in Hangzhou
- Country: China
- Province: Zhejiang
- Principal cities: Jiaxing; Huzhou; Hangzhou (part)
- Time zone: UTC+8 (CST)

Northern Zhejiang (Chinese: 浙北; pinyin: Zhèběi) is a geographic, cultural, and economic region of the province of Zhejiang, China. In contemporary usage, it is generally defined as comprising the prefecture-level cities of Jiaxing, Huzhou, and the northeastern part of the provincial capital Hangzhou, in the northwest of Zhejiang. Geographically, Northern Zhejiang sits on a lowland system known as the Northern Zhejiang Plain (Chinese: 浙北平原). It is considered part of the Yangtze River Delta megalopolis.

It is largely coincident with the Hang-Jia-Hu (杭嘉湖) region with the omission of the southwestern half of Hangzhou. The city of Hangzhou is split between Northern Zhejiang and Western Zhejiang, with the southwestern side considered Western Zhejiang instead.

Historically, Zhejiang was largely only divided as the regions of Western Zhejiang and Eastern Zhejiang, determined by geographic position with respect to the Qiantang River. Thus all of the region considered Northern Zhejiang today was previously considered Western Zhejiang. In fact, by the Ming and Qing periods, Western Zhejiang had narrowed in scope to only refer to the region presently called Northern Zhejiang.
