= Yaxi, Zhejiang =

Yaxi 雅溪镇
- Town
- Location in Zhejiang
- Coordinates: 28.5866°N 119.8770°E
- Country: People's Republic of China
- Province: Zhejiang
- Prefecture-level city: Lishui
- District: Liandu District
- Time zone: UTC+8 (China Standard)

Yaxi (Chinese: 雅溪; pinyin: Yǎxī) is a town in Liandu District, Lishui, Zhejiang province, China. As of 2020, it administers the following 19 villages:

- Shanghuang Village (上黄村)
- Zhou Village (周村)
- Jilinggen Village (季岭根村)
- Panbai Village (潘百村)
- Yali Village (雅里村)
- Shangchen Village (上陈村)
- Jinzhu Village (金竹村)
- Yanmeng Village (岩蒙村)
- Xiexia Village (泄下村)
- Daihou Village (岱后村)
- Shuangyuan Village (双源村)
- Shuangxi Village (双溪村)
- Lianfang Village (莲房村)
- Hongdu Village (洪渡村)
- Yayi Village (雅义村)
- Xixi Village (西溪村)
- Lidong Village (里东村)
- Kuchuan Village (库川村)
- Shangjinzhu Village (上金竹村)
