= Yaxi Subdistrict =

Yaxi Subdistrict 桠溪街道
- Subdistrict
- Location in Jiangsu
- Coordinates: 31°22′19″N 119°9′41″E
- Country: People's Republic of China
- Province: Jiangsu
- Prefecture-level city: Nanjing
- District: Gaochun District
- Time zone: UTC+8 (China Standard)

Yaxi Subdistrict (Chinese: 桠溪街道; pinyin: Yāxī Jiēdào) is a subdistrict in Gaochun District, Nanjing, Jiangsu province, China. As of 2020, it administers the following ten residential neighborhoods and twelve villages:

Neighborhoods

- Yaxi Community
- Zhaocun Community (赵村社区)
- Yuejin Community (跃进社区)
- Yongqing Community (永庆社区)
- Jingshan Community (荆山社区)
- Lanxi Community (蓝溪社区)
- Qiaoli Community (桥李社区)
- Gulong Community (顾陇社区)
- Yaodang Community (瑶宕社区)
- Xuhe Community (胥河社区)

Villages

- Anle Village (安乐村)
- Guanwei Village (观圩村)
- Guanxi Village (观溪村)
- Shangyi Village (尚义村)
- Mujiazhuang Village (穆家庄村)
- Xintang Village (新塘村)
- Xingwang Village (兴旺村)
- Zhendong Village (镇东村)
- Huayi Village (花义村)
- Hanqiao Village (韩桥村)
- Zhennan Village (镇南村)
- Xinqiang Village (新墙村)

Yaxi is China's first member of the Cittaslow movement.

== See also ==
- List of township-level divisions of Jiangsu
