= Gaochun station =

Nanjing Metro station

Gaochun 高淳
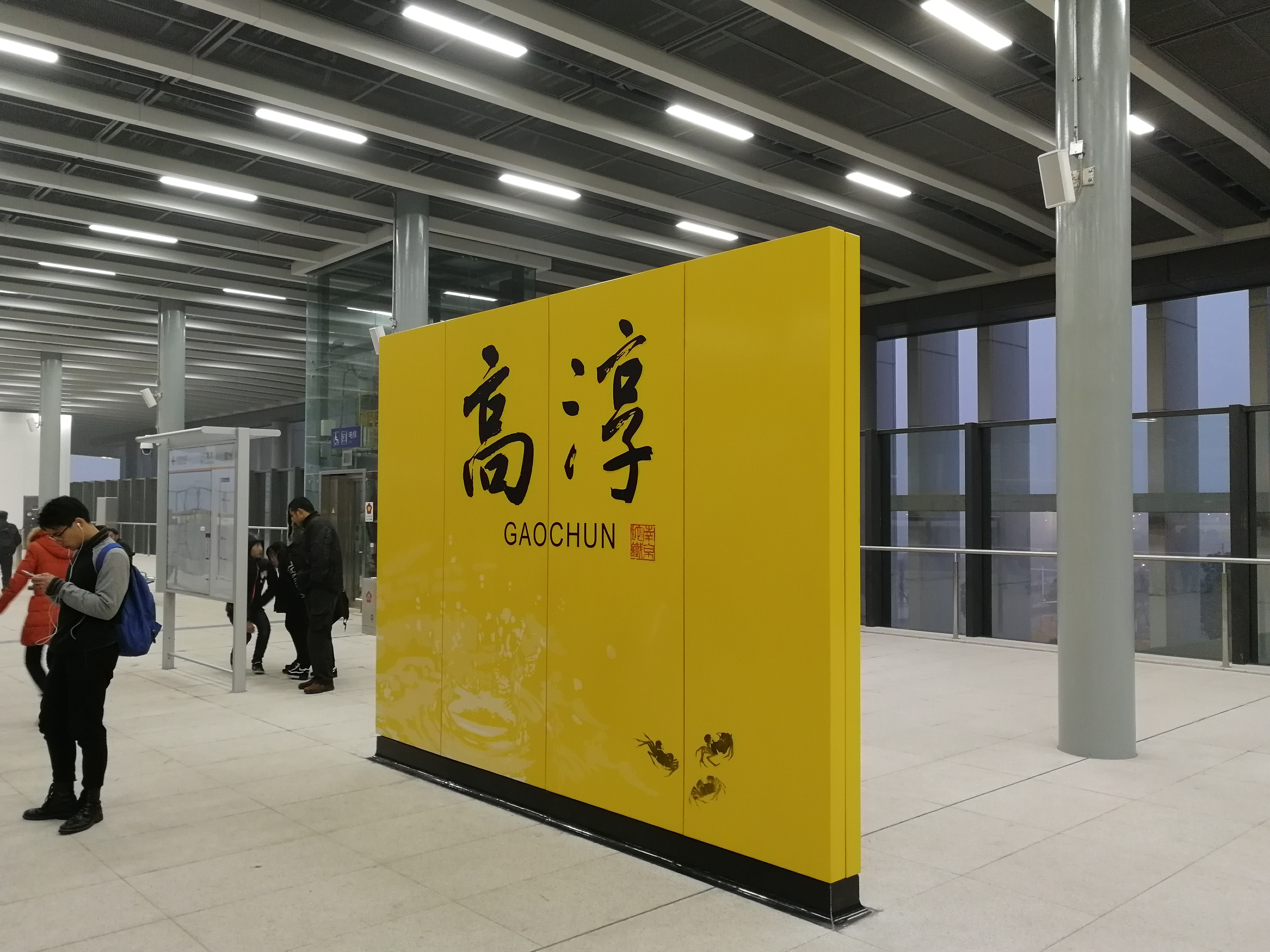

General information
- Location: Gaochun District, Nanjing, Jiangsu; China
- Operated by: Nanjing Metro Co. Ltd.
- Line: Line S9

History
- Opened: 30 December 2017

Services
Preceding station	Nanjing Metro	Following station
Tuanjiewei towards Xiangyulunan	Line S9	Terminus
Location

Gaochun station (Chinese: 高淳站) is a station of Line S9 of the Nanjing Metro. It started operations on 30 December 2017.
