= Xiangyulunan station =

Nanjing Metro station

Xiangyulunan 翔宇路南
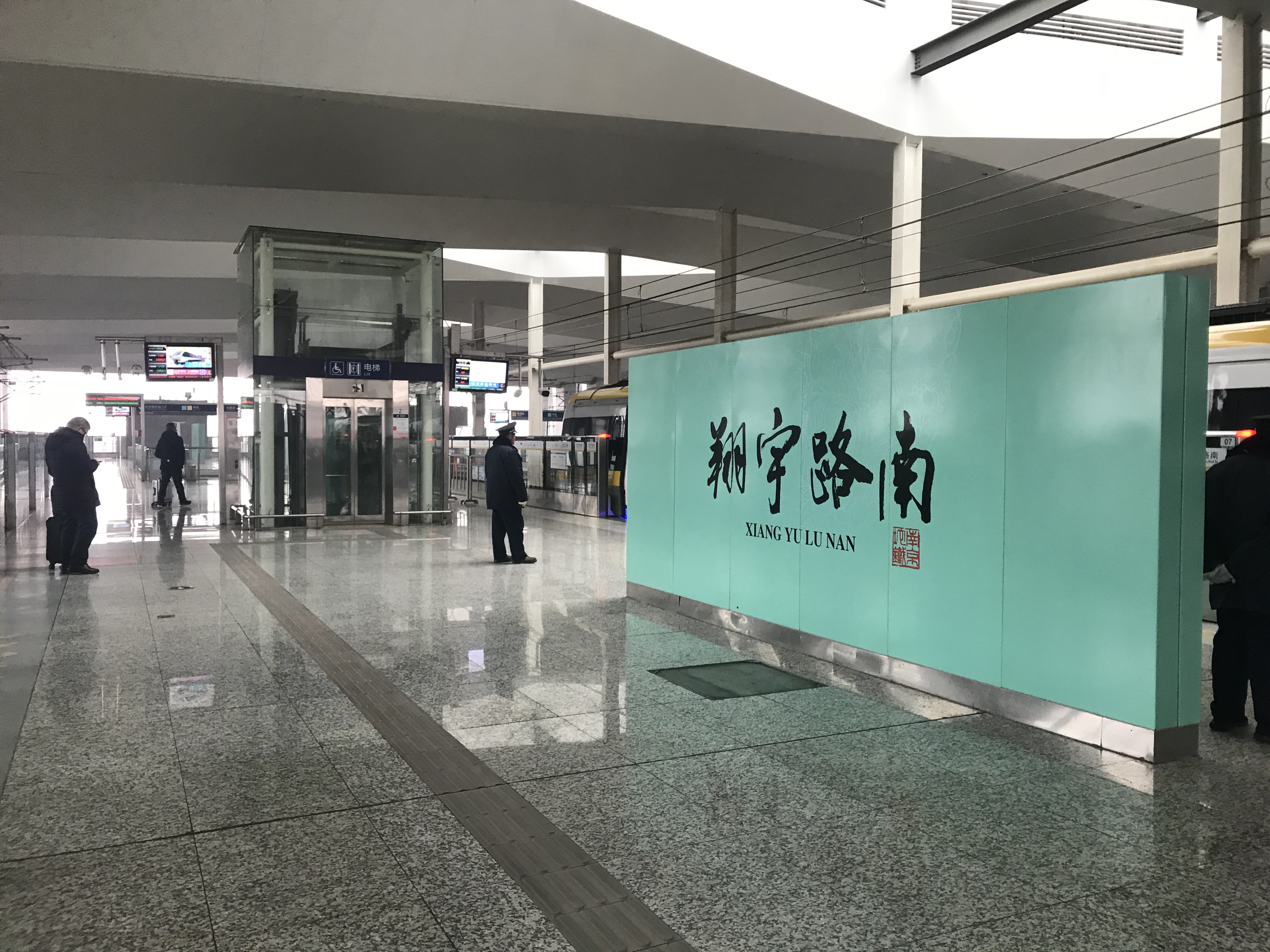

General information
- Location: Jiangning District, Nanjing, Jiangsu; China
- Coordinates: 31.7569°N 118.82412°E
- Operated by: Nanjing Metro Co. Ltd.
- Lines: Line S1; Line S9

Construction
- Structure type: Elevated

History
- Opened: 1 July 2014; 11 years ago

Services
Preceding station	Nanjing Metro	Following station
Xiangyulubei towards Nanjing South Railway Station	Line S1	Lukou International Airport towards Konggangxinchengjiangning
Terminus	Line S9	Tongshan towards Gaochun
Location

Xiangyulunan station (Chinese: 翔宇路南站) is a cross-platform interchange station of Line S1 and Line S9 of the Nanjing Metro. It started operations on 1 July 2014.
