= Gaochun, Nanjing =

Gaochun 高淳区 Kaoshun
- District
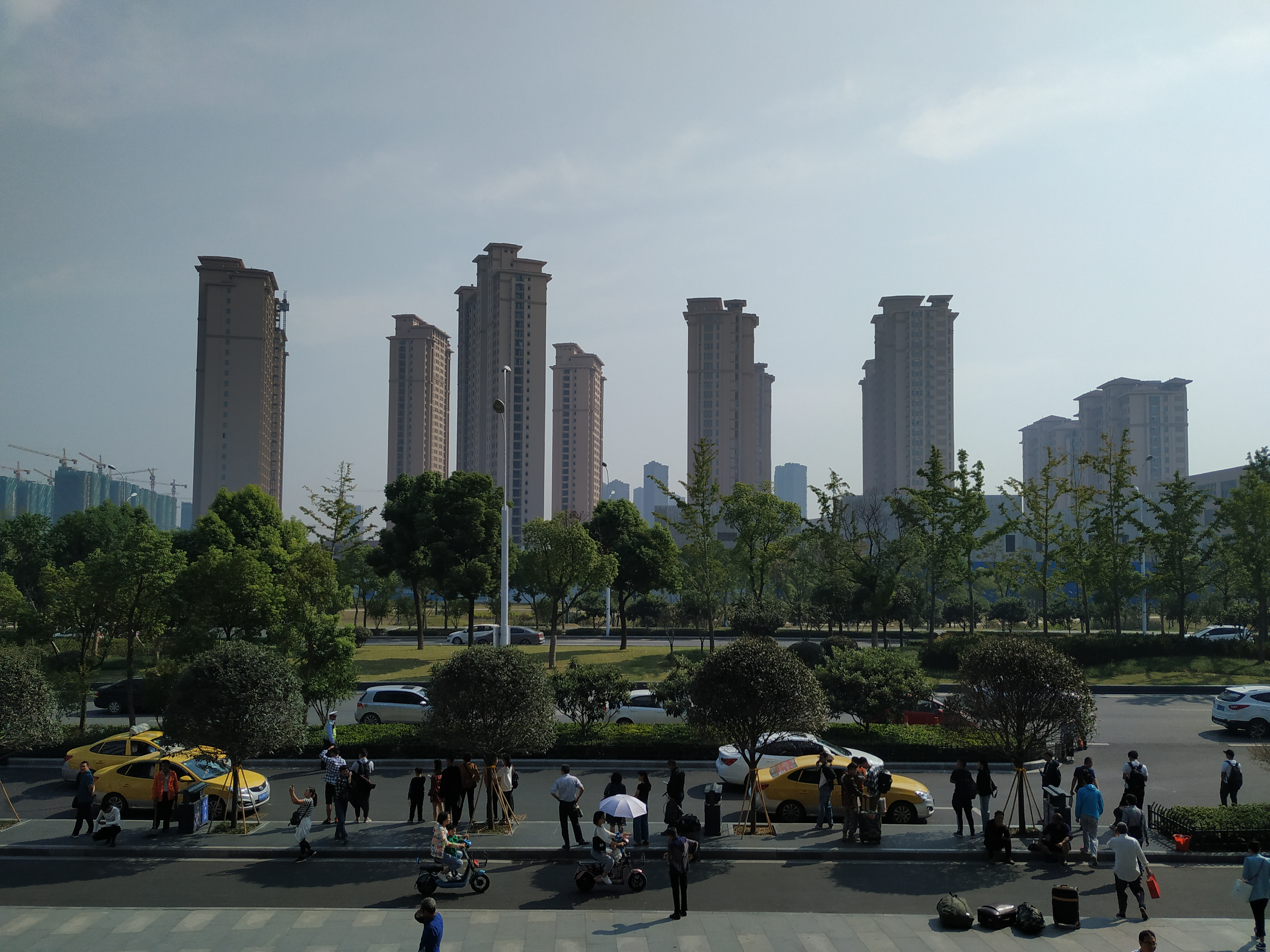

- Location in Jiangsu
- Coordinates: 31°21′29″N 118°57′34″E
- Country: People's Republic of China
- Province: Jiangsu
- Sub-provincial city: Nanjing

Area
  - Total: 790.23 km^{2} (305.11 sq mi)

Population (2015)
  - Total: 439,000
  - Density: 556/km^{2} (1,440/sq mi)
- Time zone: UTC+8 (China Standard)
- Postal code: 211300
Nanjing district map
Subdivisions of Nanjing, Jiangsu
City Proper
1	Xuanwu
2	Qinhuai
3	Jianye
4	Gulou
5	Yuhuatai
6	Qixia
Suburban
7	Jiangning
8	Pukou
9	Luhe
Rural
10	Lishui
11	Gaochun

Gaochun District (simplified Chinese: 高淳区; traditional Chinese: 高淳區; pinyin: Gāochún Qū), formerly Gaochun County (高淳县; 高淳縣; Gāochún Xiàn) until January 2013, is one of 11 districts of Nanjing, the capital of Jiangsu province, China. The southernmost of Nanjing's districts, bordering the province of Anhui to the south and west, it spans an area of 802 km^{2} (310 sq mi), with a total population of 430,000.

== Culture ==
Gaochun is known for its traditional style shopping area known as Gaochun Old Street. The local language is the Xuanzhou dialect of Wu Chinese, unlike the rest of Nanjing, where mostly Lower Yangtze Mandarin is spoken.

== Administrative divisions ==
There are 8 towns that fall under the jurisdiction of Gaochun District. They are:

- Chunxi (淳溪镇)
- Qiqiao (漆桥镇)
- Yaxi (桠溪镇)
- Yangjiang (阳江镇)
- Gucheng (固城镇)
- Dongba (东坝镇)
- Gubai (古柏镇)
- Zhuanqiang (砖墙镇)

Former towns

- Dingbu (定埠镇) - is former town which is merged to other.

== Climate ==
Climate data for Gaochun, elevation 17 m (56 ft), (1991–2020 normals, extremes 1981–present)
Month	Jan	Feb	Mar	Apr	May	Jun	Jul	Aug	Sep	Oct	Nov	Dec	Year
Record high °C (°F)	21.8 (71.2)	28.3 (82.9)	34.5 (94.1)	34.1 (93.4)	36.4 (97.5)	38.0 (100.4)	39.7 (103.5)	39.1 (102.4)	39.0 (102.2)	32.7 (90.9)	28.5 (83.3)	22.9 (73.2)	39.7 (103.5)
Mean daily maximum °C (°F)	7.6 (45.7)	10.4 (50.7)	15.4 (59.7)	21.8 (71.2)	26.9 (80.4)	29.4 (84.9)	33.0 (91.4)	32.5 (90.5)	28.3 (82.9)	23.1 (73.6)	16.9 (62.4)	10.3 (50.5)	21.3 (70.3)
Daily mean °C (°F)	3.7 (38.7)	6.1 (43.0)	10.6 (51.1)	16.7 (62.1)	22.0 (71.6)	25.3 (77.5)	28.9 (84.0)	28.4 (83.1)	24.1 (75.4)	18.5 (65.3)	12.3 (54.1)	6.0 (42.8)	16.9 (62.4)
Mean daily minimum °C (°F)	0.8 (33.4)	2.8 (37.0)	6.8 (44.2)	12.4 (54.3)	17.8 (64.0)	21.9 (71.4)	25.7 (78.3)	25.2 (77.4)	20.8 (69.4)	14.9 (58.8)	8.7 (47.7)	2.8 (37.0)	13.4 (56.1)
Record low °C (°F)	−9.7 (14.5)	−7.8 (18.0)	−3.7 (25.3)	1.8 (35.2)	8.1 (46.6)	13.6 (56.5)	18.9 (66.0)	18.1 (64.6)	12.3 (54.1)	4.0 (39.2)	−3.4 (25.9)	−10.0 (14.0)	−10.0 (14.0)
Average precipitation mm (inches)	69.2 (2.72)	71.7 (2.82)	102.0 (4.02)	100.2 (3.94)	116.4 (4.58)	218.3 (8.59)	205.3 (8.08)	150.6 (5.93)	92.8 (3.65)	57.8 (2.28)	59.0 (2.32)	43.9 (1.73)	1,287.2 (50.66)
Average precipitation days (≥ 0.1 mm)	10.9	10.6	12.7	11.5	11.8	12.9	12.1	12.2	8.5	8.5	9.5	8.2	129.4
Average snowy days	3.7	2.1	0.6	0	0	0	0	0	0	0	0.3	1.0	7.7
Average relative humidity (%)	77	76	74	72	72	78	78	79	78	76	77	75	76
Mean monthly sunshine hours	115.2	116.9	141.9	169.7	184.5	155.2	209.7	206.1	170.1	167.0	140.9	131.3	1,908.5
Percentage possible sunshine	36	37	38	44	43	37	49	51	46	48	45	42	43
Source: China Meteorological Administration all-time January high

== Education ==
- Jiangsu Gaochun High School (1923)
