= Defensive wall =

Fortification used to protect an area from potential aggressors

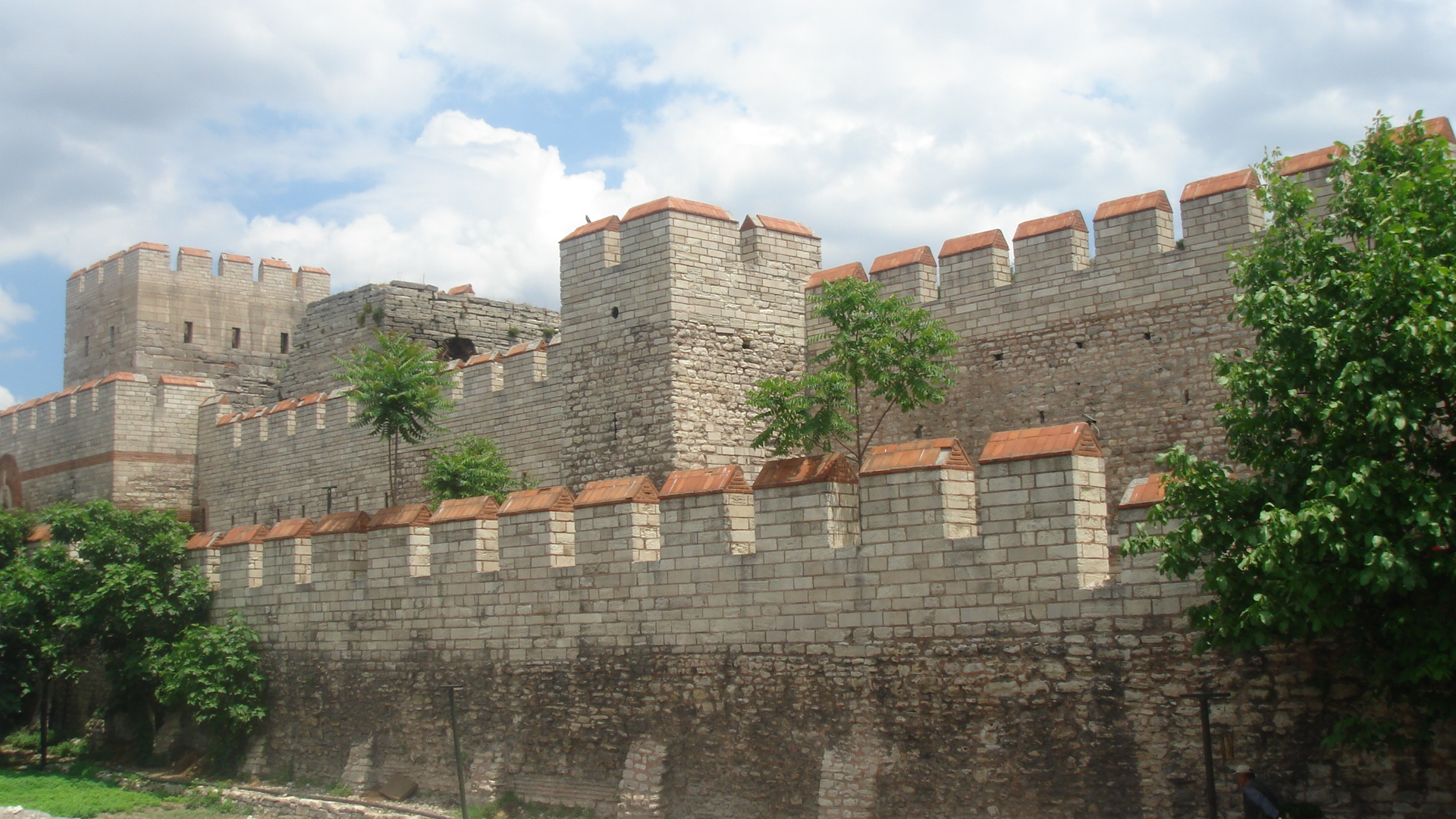
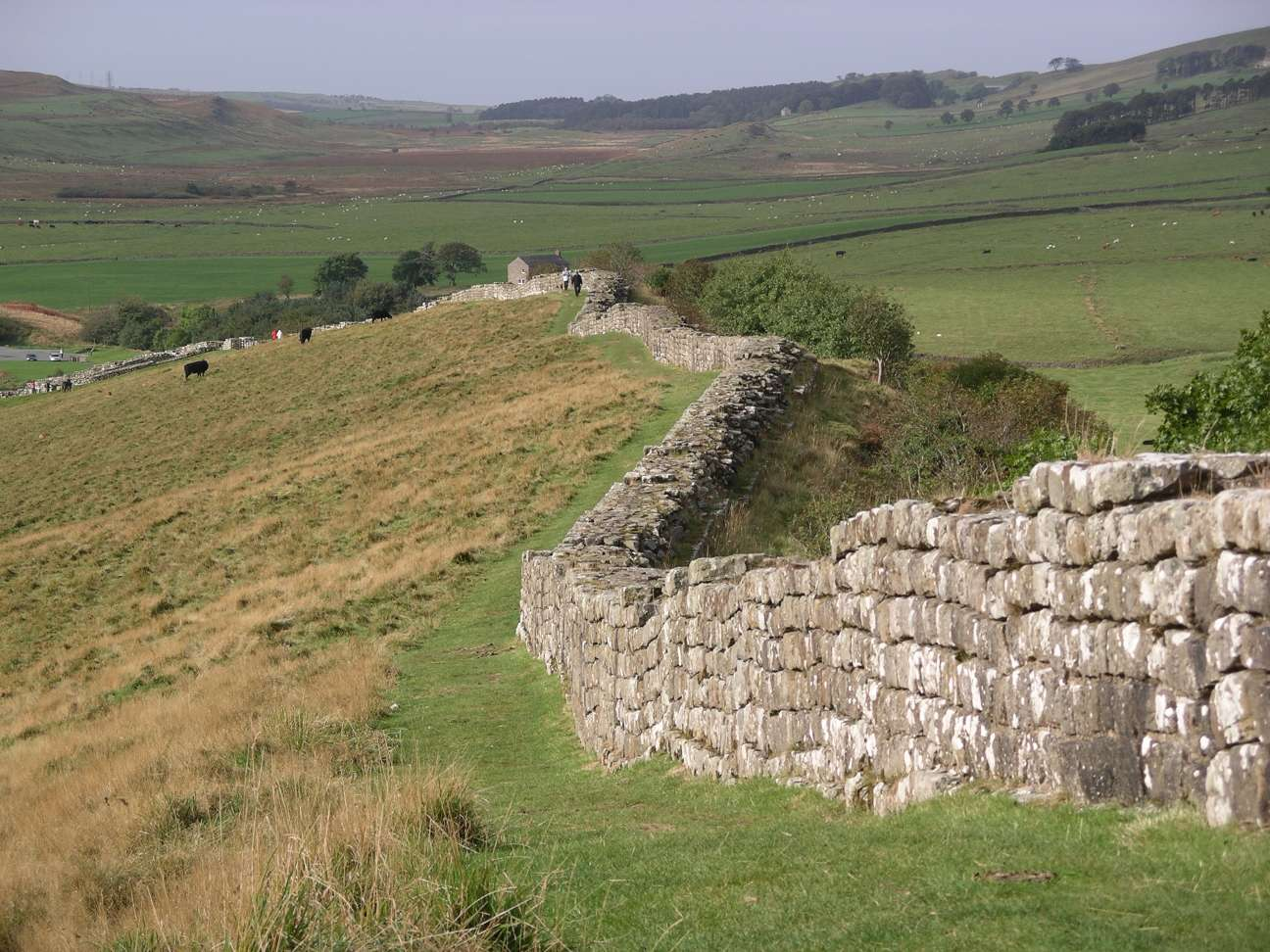
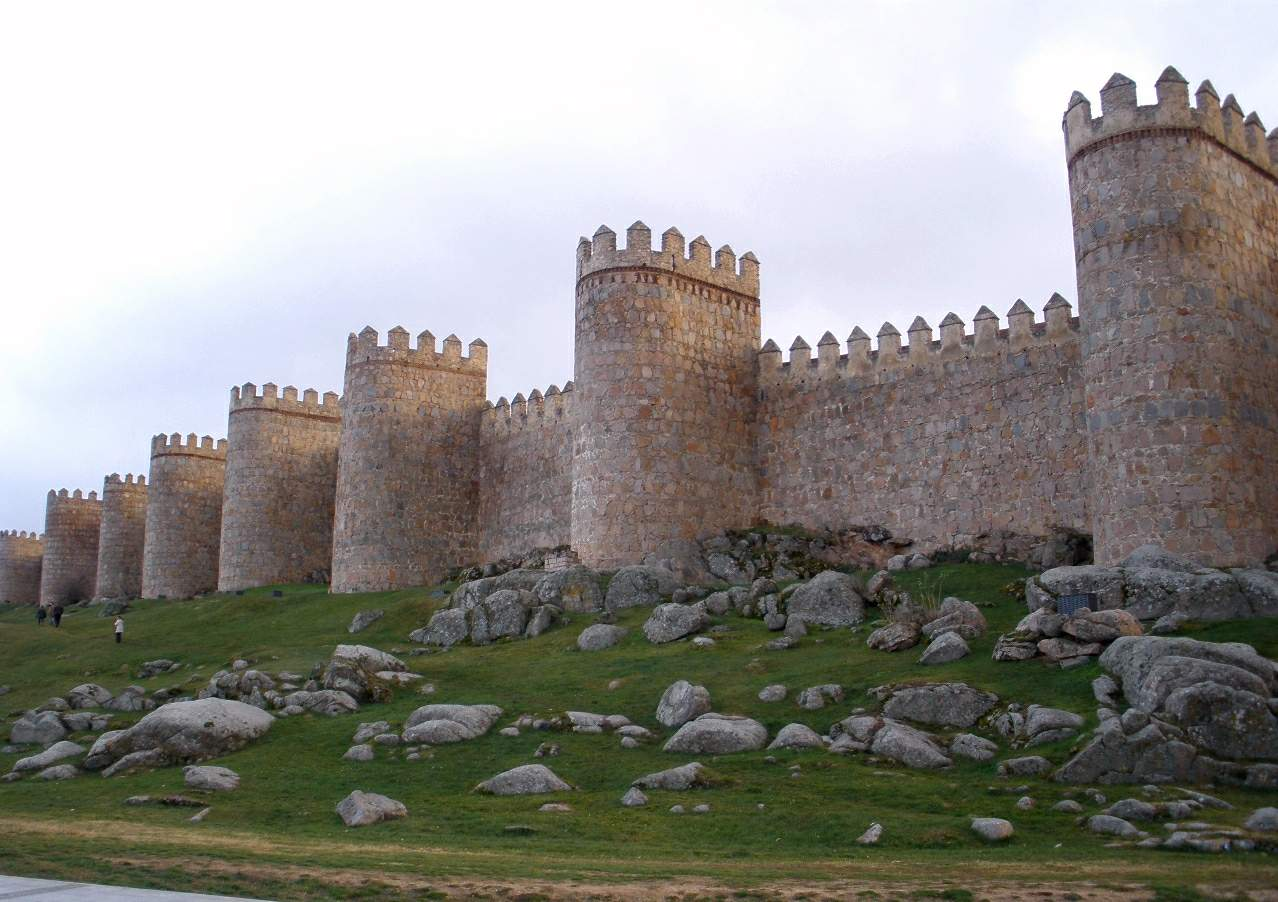
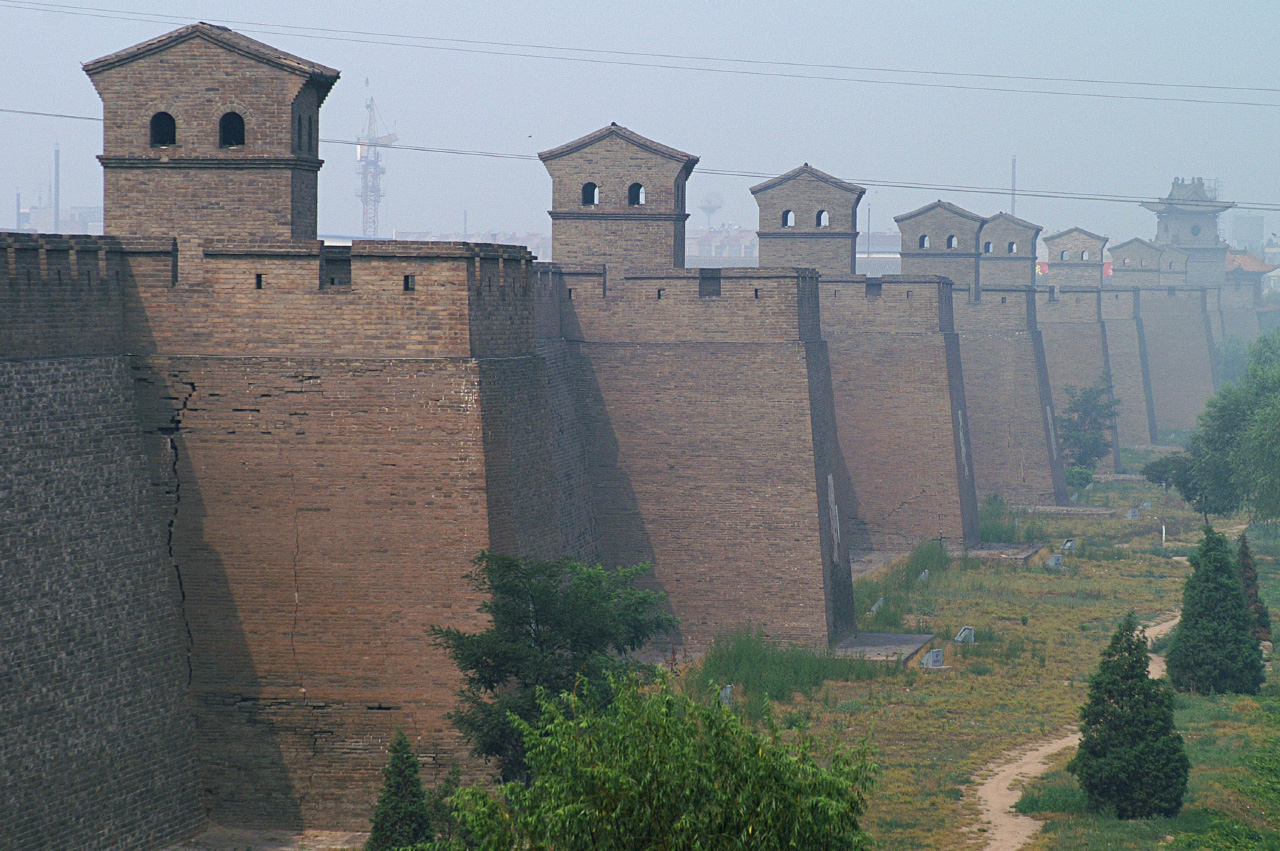
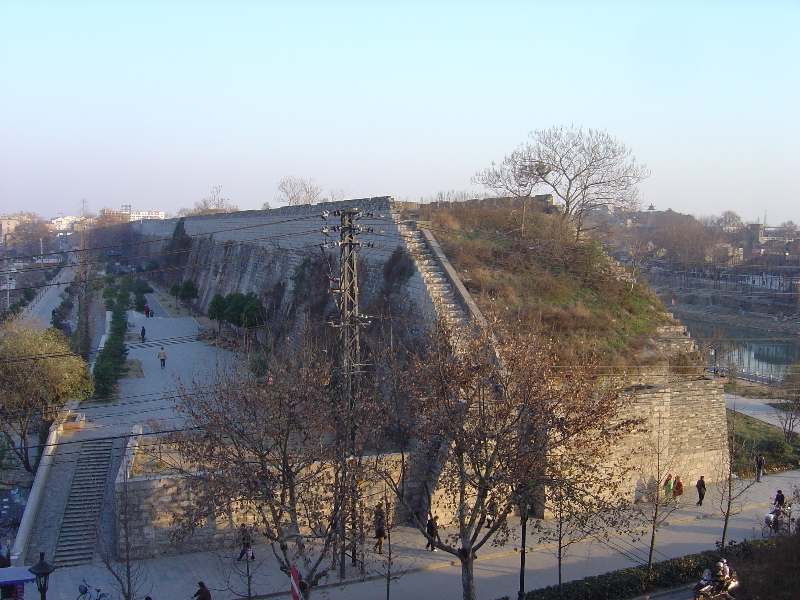
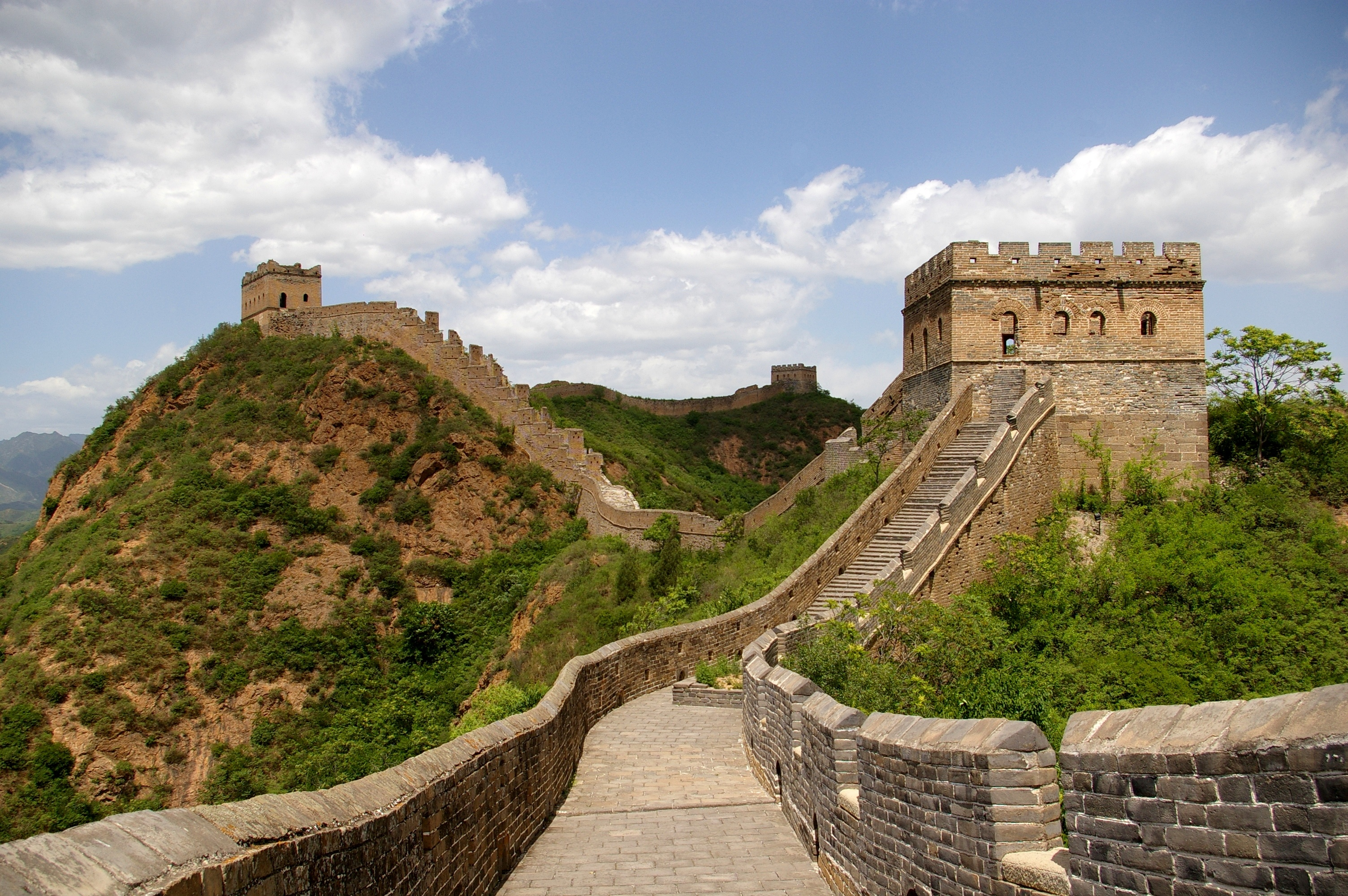
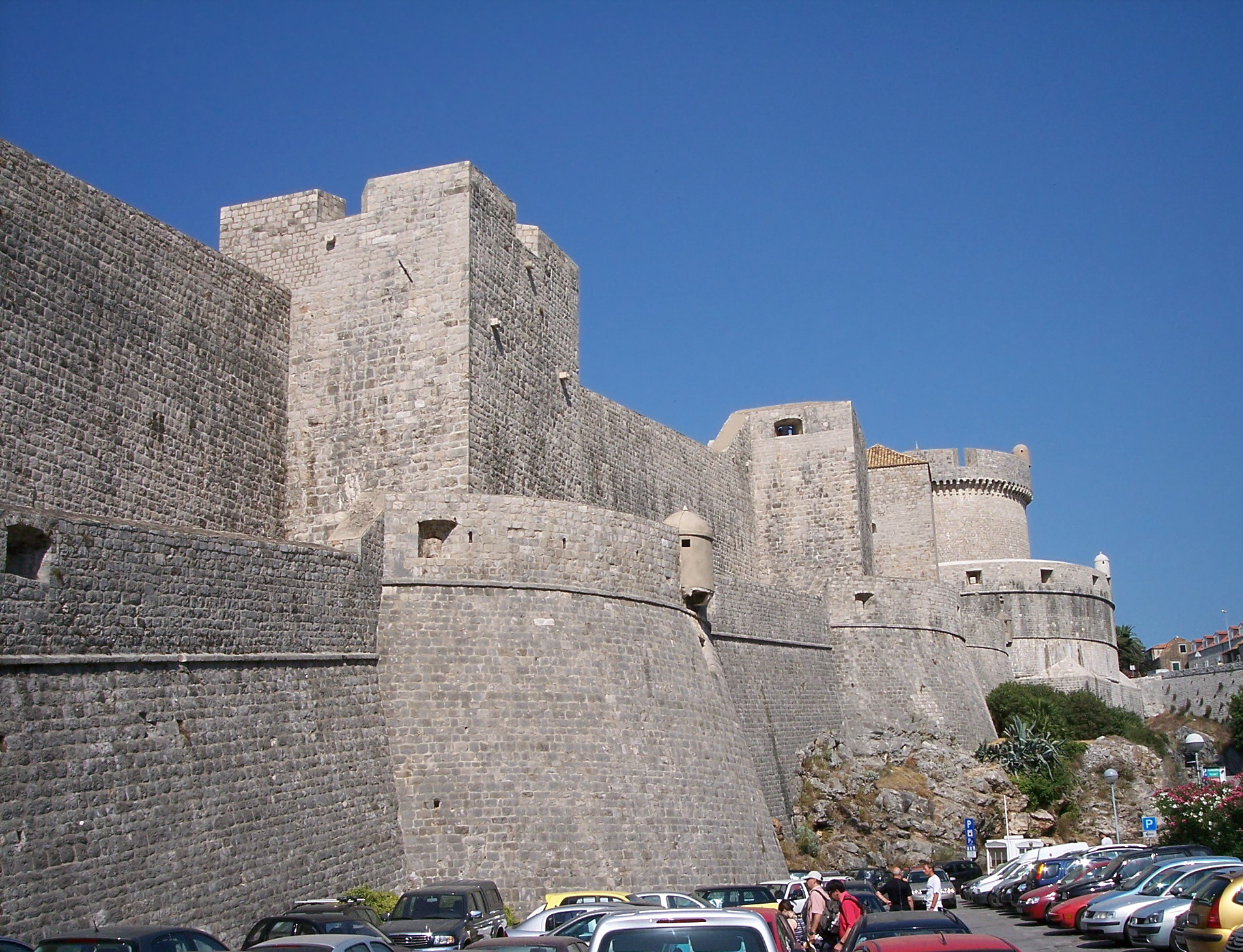
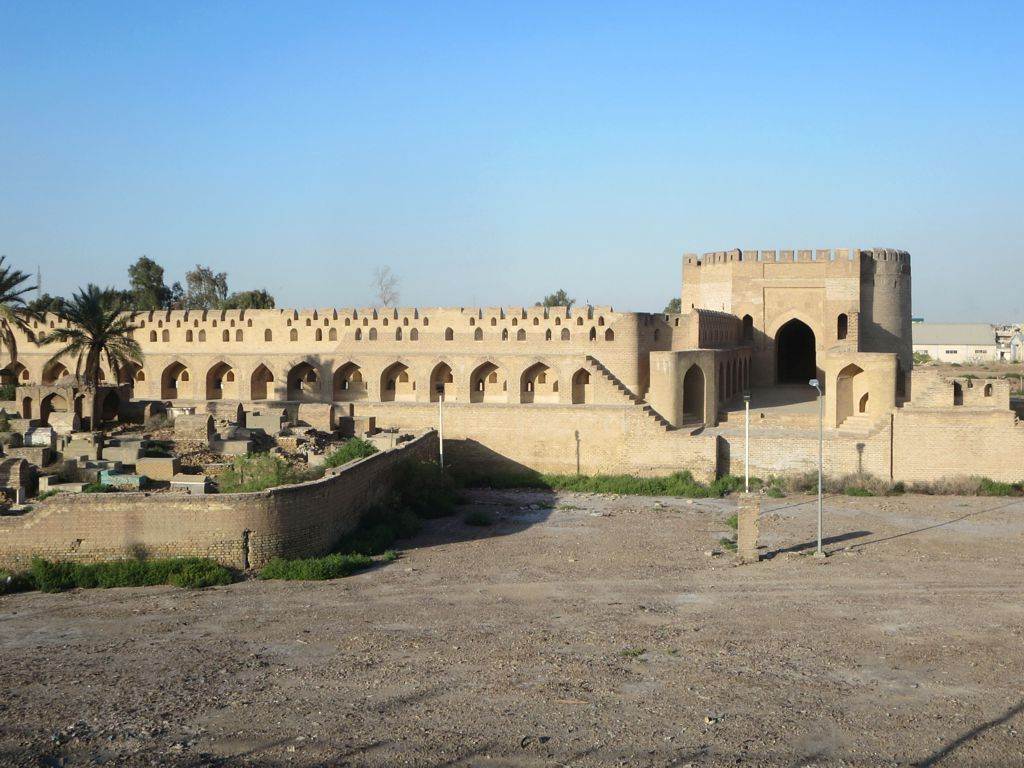
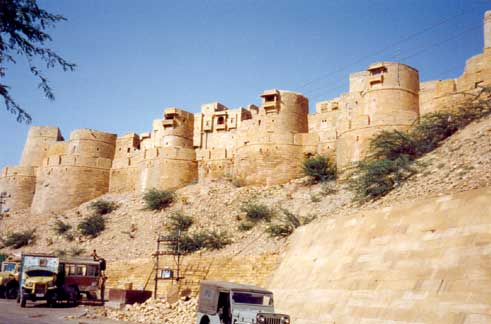
Left to right: Walls of Constantinople, Hadrian's Wall, Walls of Ávila, walls of Pingyao and Nanjing, two sections of the Great Wall of China, Walls of Dubrovnik, Gates of Baghdad, walls of the Jaisalmer Fort.

A defensive wall is a fortification usually used to protect a city, town or other settlement from potential aggressors. The walls can range from simple palisades or earthworks to extensive military fortifications such as curtain walls with towers, bastions and gates for access to the city. From ancient to modern times, they were used to enclose settlements. Generally, these are referred to as city walls or town walls, although there were also walls, such as the Great Wall of China, Walls of Benin, Hadrian's Wall, Anastasian Wall, and the Atlantic Wall, which extended far beyond the borders of a city and were used to enclose regions or mark territorial boundaries. In mountainous terrain, defensive walls such as letzis were used in combination with castles to seal valleys from potential attack. Beyond their defensive utility, many walls also had important symbolic functions – representing the status and independence of the communities they embraced.

Existing ancient walls are almost always masonry structures, although brick and timber-built variants are also known. Depending on the topography of the area surrounding the city or the settlement the wall is intended to protect, elements of the terrain such as rivers or coastlines may be incorporated in order to make the wall more effective.

Walls may only be crossed by entering the appropriate city gate and are often supplemented with towers. The practice of building these massive walls, though having its origins in prehistory, was refined during the rise of city-states, and energetic wall-building continued into the medieval period and beyond in certain parts of Europe.

Simpler defensive walls of earth or stone, thrown up around hillforts, ringworks, early castles and the like, tend to be referred to as ramparts or banks.

== History ==
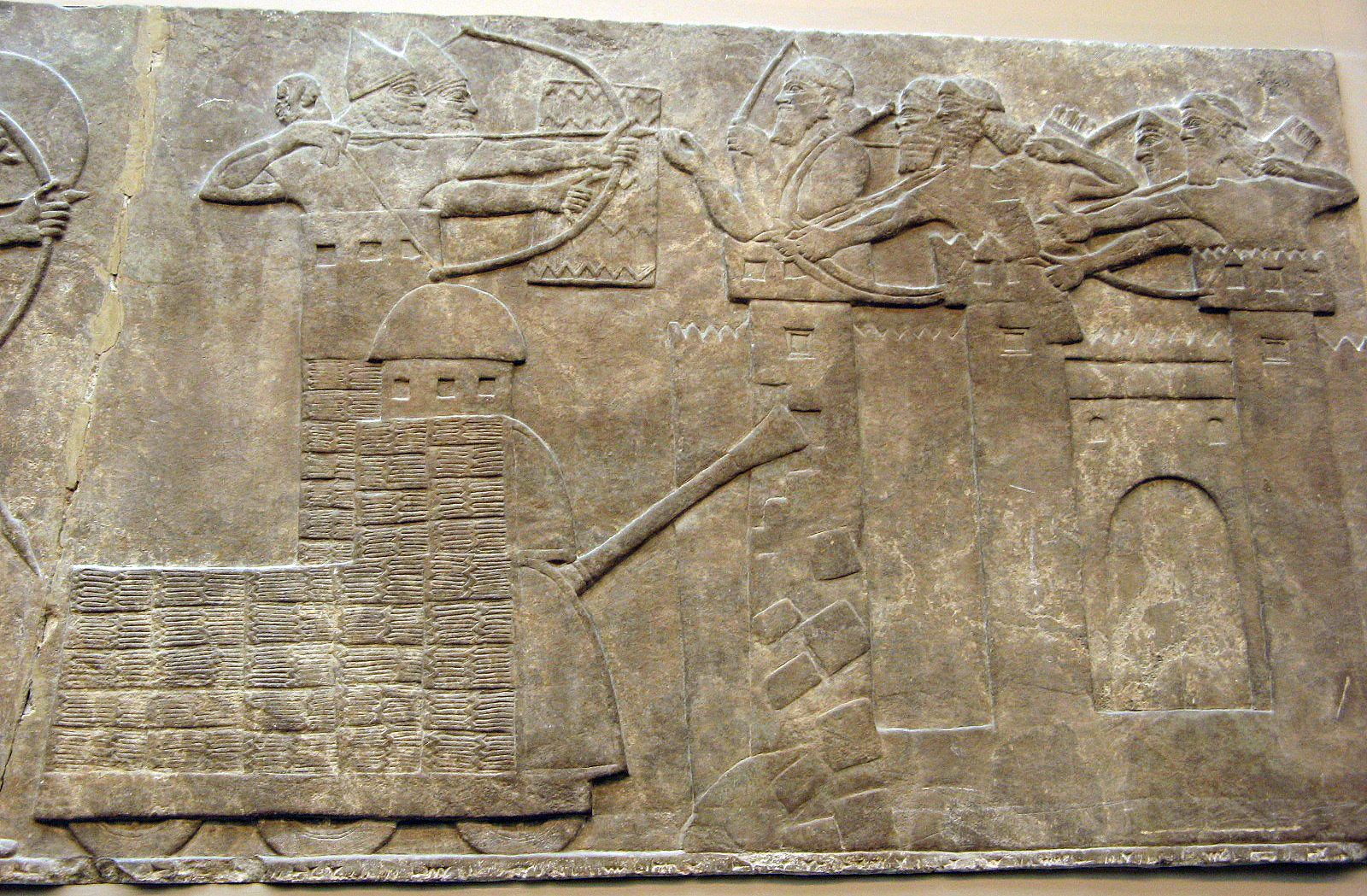
9th century BC relief of an Assyrian attack on a walled town

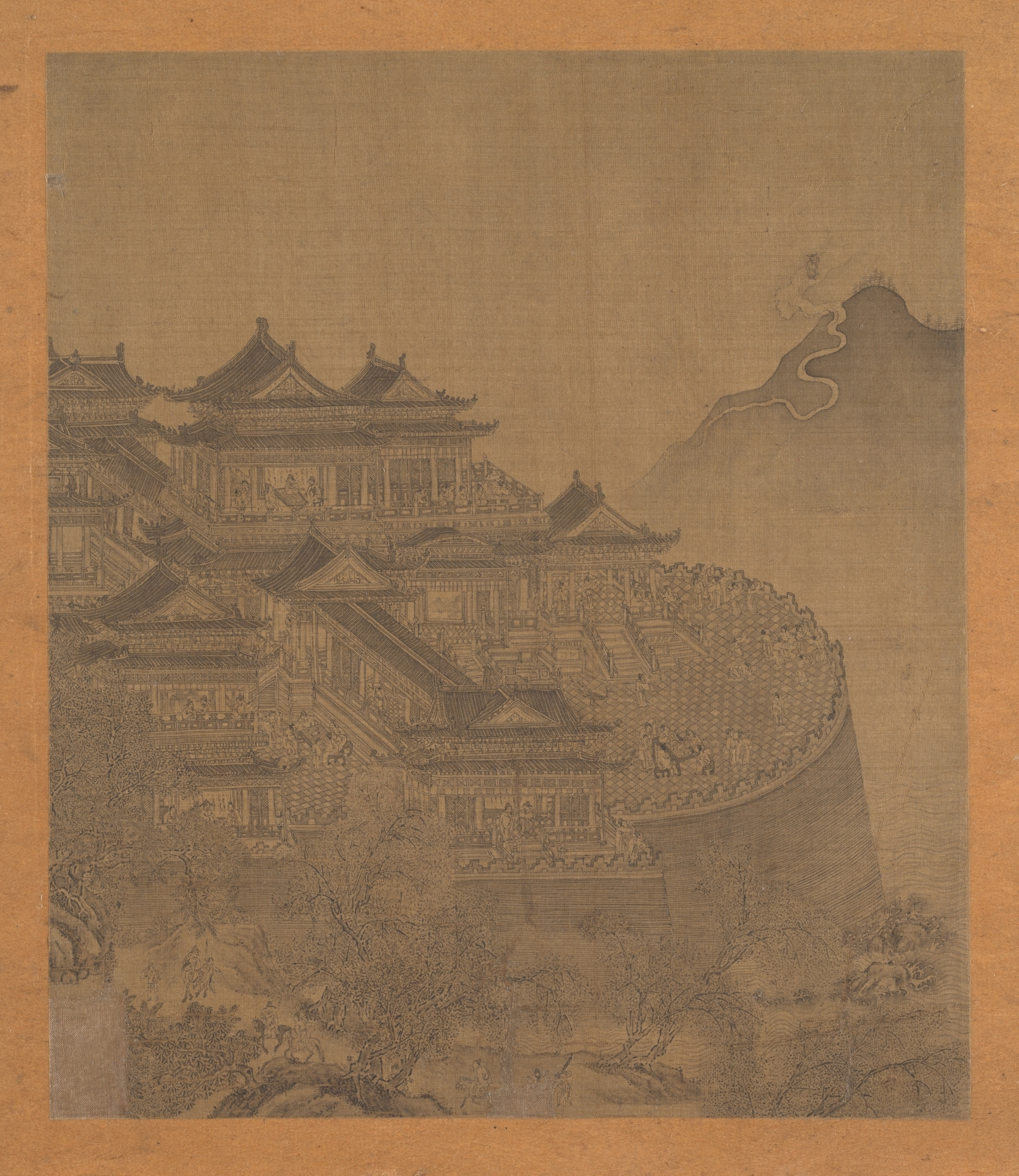
The lakeside wall of the Yueyang Tower, Yuan dynasty

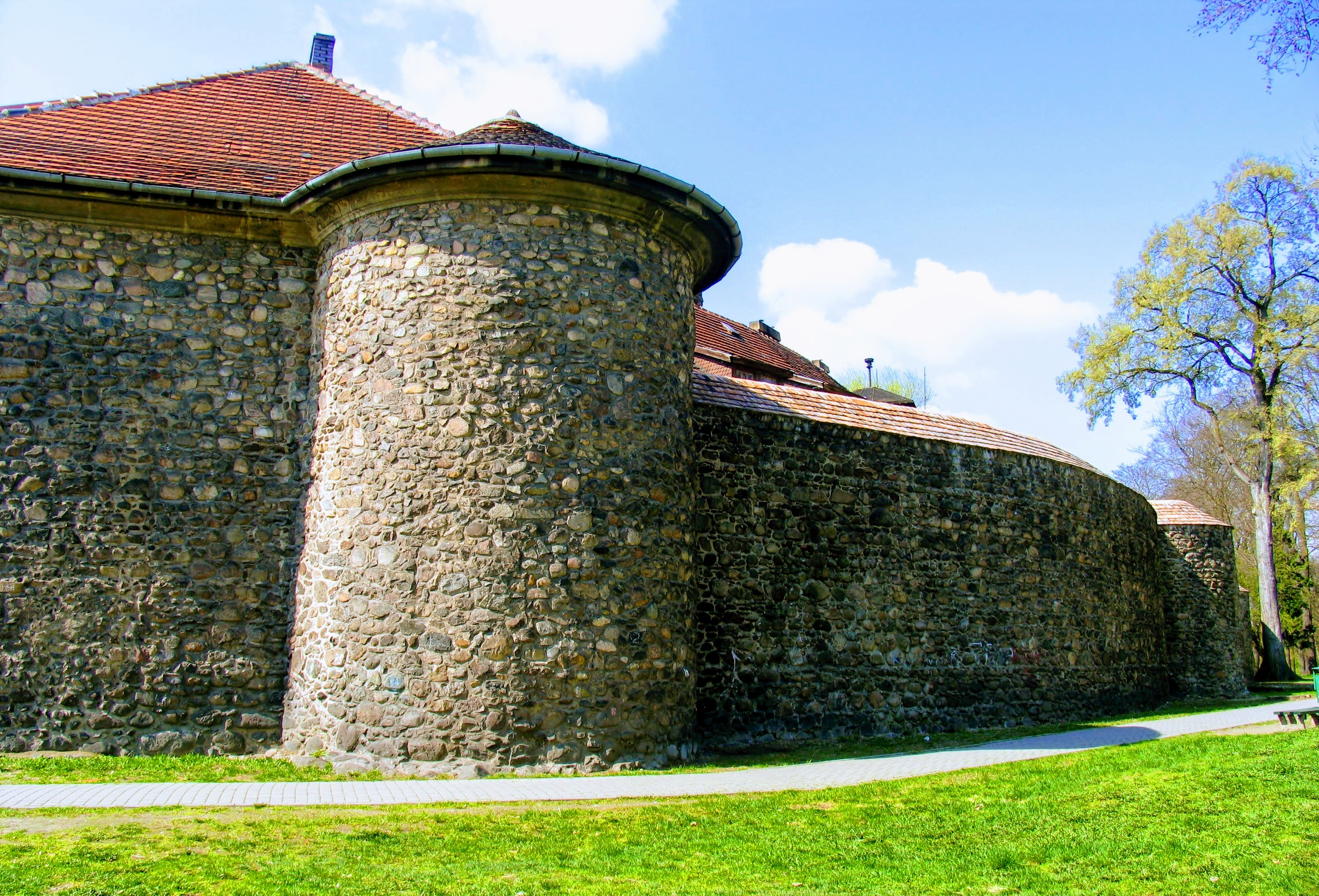
Medieval defensive walls and towers in Szprotawa, Poland, made of field stone and bog iron

=== Mesopotamia ===
From very early history to modern times, walls have been a near necessity for every city. Uruk in ancient Sumer (Mesopotamia) is one of the world's oldest known walled cities. Before that, the proto-city of Jericho in the West Bank had a wall surrounding it as early as the 8th millennium BC. The earliest known town wall in Europe is of Solnitsata, built in the 6th or 5th millennium BC.

The Assyrians deployed large labour forces to build new palaces, temples and defensive walls.

Babylon was one of the most famous cities of the ancient world, especially as a result of the building program of Nebuchadnezzar, who expanded the walls and built the Ishtar Gate.

The Persians built defensive walls to protect their territories, notably the Derbent Wall and the Great Wall of Gorgan built on the either sides of the Caspian Sea against nomadic nations.

=== South Asia ===
Some settlements in the Indus Valley civilization were also fortified. By about 3500 BC, hundreds of small farming villages dotted the Indus floodplain. Many of these settlements had fortifications and planned streets. The stone and mud brick houses of Kot Diji were clustered behind massive stone flood dykes and defensive walls, for neighboring communities quarreled constantly about the control of prime agricultural land. Mundigak (c. 2500 BC) in present-day south-east Afghanistan has defensive walls and square bastions of sun dried bricks.

=== Southeast Asia ===
The concept of a city fully enclosed by walls was not fully developed in Southeast Asia until the arrival of Europeans. However, Burma serves an exception, as they had a longer tradition of fortified walled towns; towns in Burma had city walls by 1566. Besides that, Rangoon in 1755 had stockades made of teak logs on a ground rampart. The city was fortified with six city gates with each gate flanked by massive brick towers.

In other areas of Southeast Asia, city walls spread in the 16th and 17th century along with the rapid growth of cities in this period as a need to defend against European naval attack. Ayutthaya built its walls in 1550 and Banten, Jepara, Tuban and Surabaya all had theirs by 1600; while Makassar had theirs by 1634. A sea wall was the main defense for Gelgel. For cities that did not have city walls, the least it would have had was a stockaded citadel. This wooden walled area housed the royal citadel or aristocratic compounds such as in Surakarta and Aceh.

=== China ===
Large rammed earth walls were built in ancient China since the Shang dynasty (c. 1600–1050 BC), as the capital at ancient Ao had enormous walls built in this fashion (see siege for more info). Although stone walls were built in China during the Warring States (481–221 BC), mass conversion to stone architecture did not begin in earnest until the Tang dynasty (618–907 AD). Sections of the Great Wall had been built prior to the Qin dynasty (221–207 BC) and subsequently connected and fortified during the Qin dynasty, although its present form was mostly an engineering feat and remodeling of the Ming dynasty (1368–1644 AD). The large walls of Pingyao serve as one example. Likewise, the walls of the Forbidden City in Beijing were established in the early 15th century by the Yongle Emperor. According to Tonio Andrade, the immense thickness of Chinese city walls prevented larger cannons from being developed, since even industrial era artillery had trouble breaching Chinese walls.

=== Korea ===
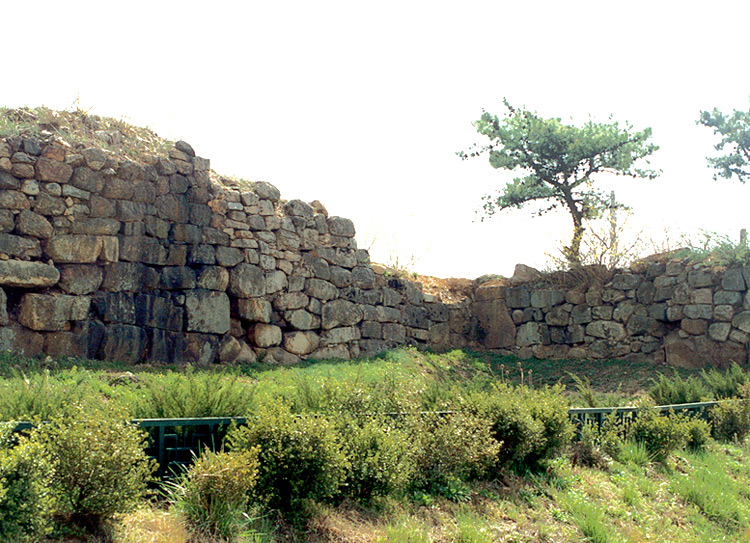
Dangjin-myeoncheon-eupseong (唐津沔川邑城)

Eupseongs (Hangul: 읍성), 'city fortresses', which served both military and administrative functions, have been constructed since the time of Silla until the end of the Joseon dynasty. Throughout the period of the Joseon dynasty eupseongs were modified and renovated, and new eupseongs were built, but in 1910 Japan (the occupying power of Korea) issued an order for their demolition, resulting in most being destroyed. Studies of the ruins and reconstructions of the ancient city walls are currently being undertaken at some sites.

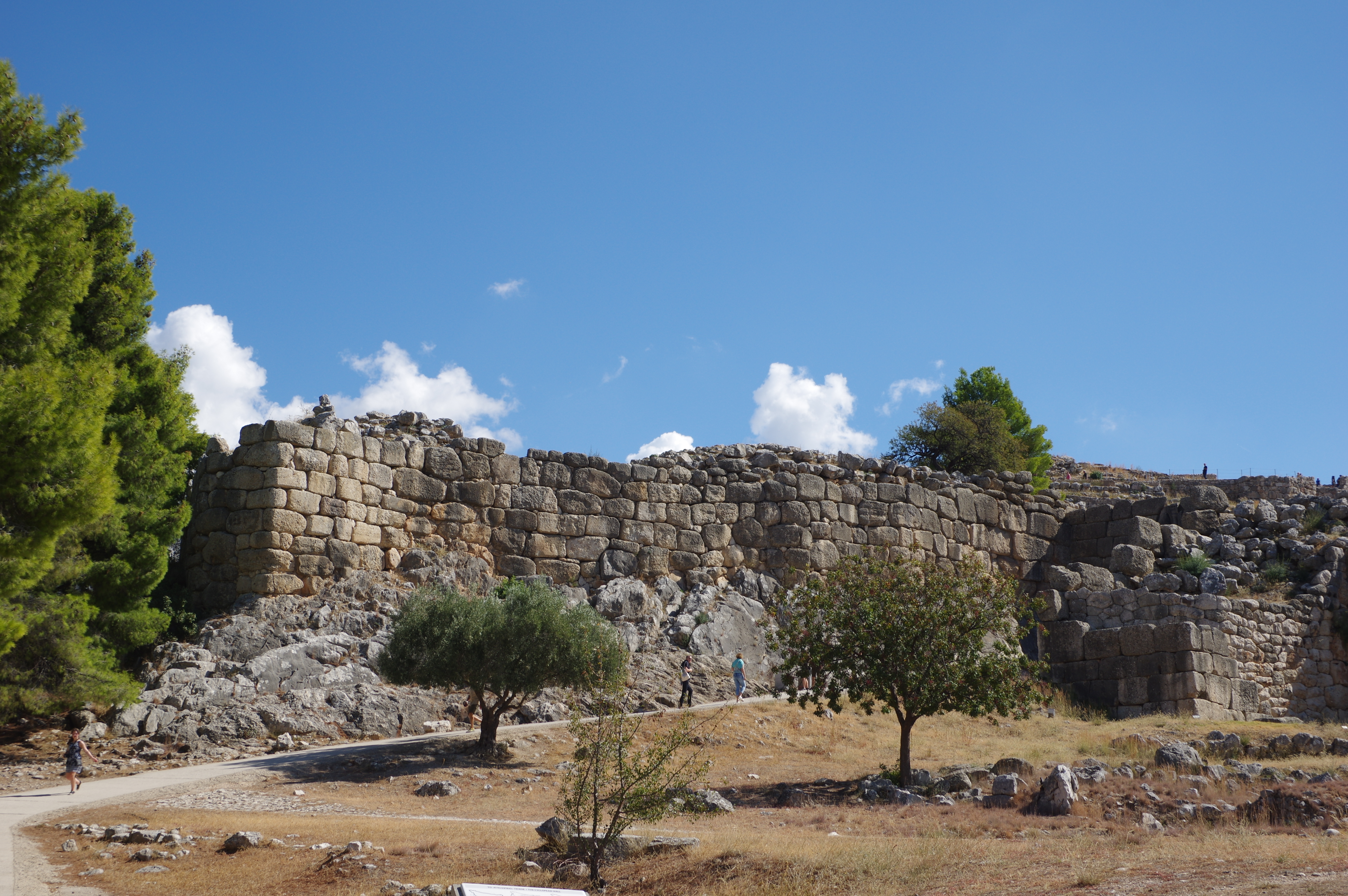
Cyclopean Walls of Mycenae

=== Europe ===
In ancient Greece, large stone walls had been built in Mycenaean Greece, such as the ancient site of Mycenae (famous for the huge stone blocks of its 'cyclopean' walls). In classical era Greece, the city of Athens built a long set of parallel stone walls called the Long Walls that reached their guarded seaport at Piraeus. Exceptions were few, but neither ancient Sparta nor ancient Rome had walls for a long time, choosing to rely on their militaries for defense instead. Initially, these fortifications were simple constructions of wood and earth, which were later replaced by mixed constructions of stones piled on top of each other without mortar.

The Romans later fortified their cities with massive, mortar-bound stone walls. Among these are the largely extant Aurelian Walls of Rome and the Theodosian Walls of Constantinople, together with partial remains elsewhere. These are mostly city gates, like the Porta Nigra in Trier or Newport Arch in Lincoln.

In Central Europe, the Celts built large fortified settlements which the Romans called oppida, whose walls seem partially influenced by those built in the Mediterranean. The fortifications were continuously expanded and improved.

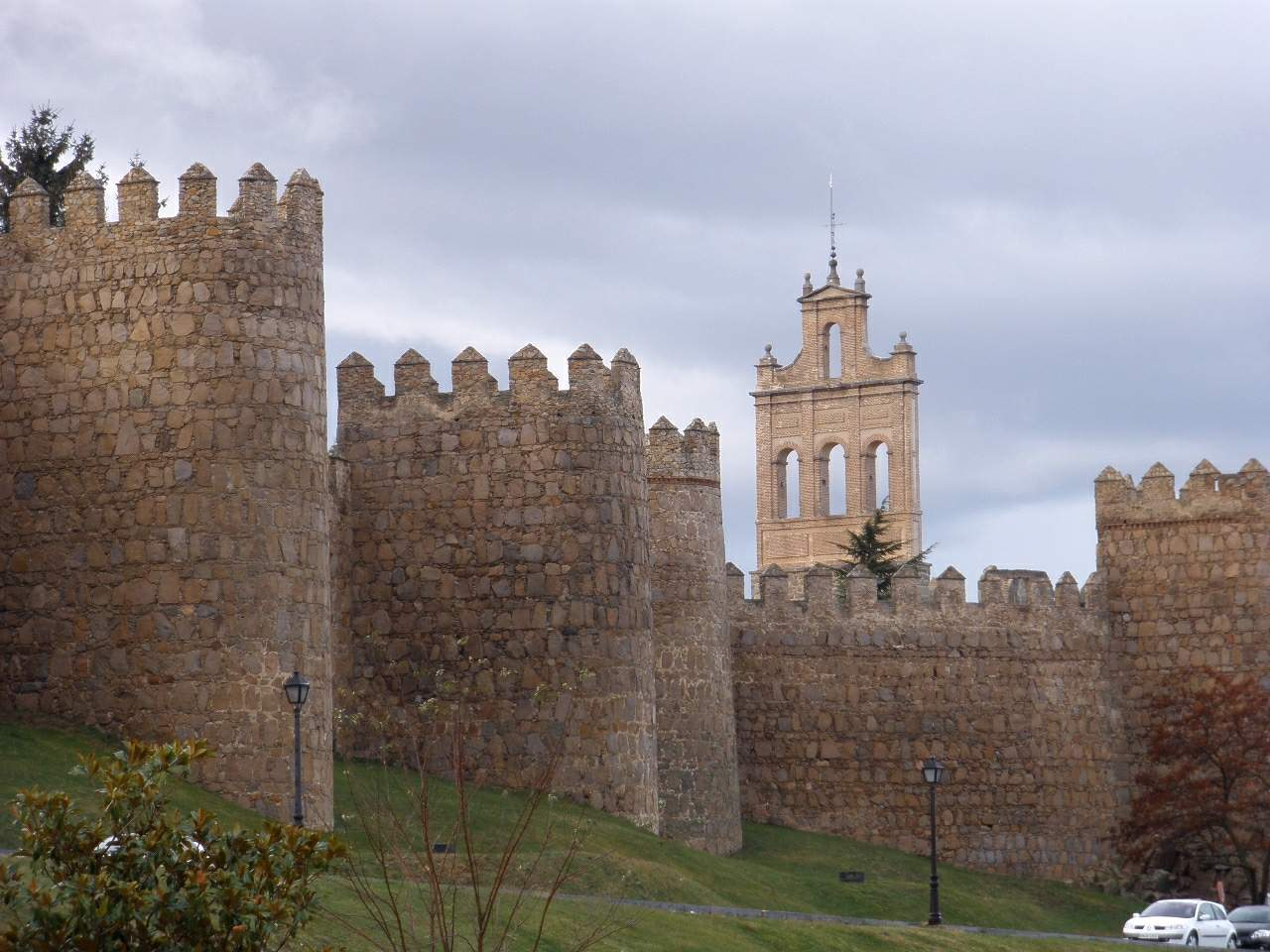
The medieval Walls of Avila (Spain) are one of Europe's best preserved walls.

Apart from these, the early Middle Ages also saw the creation of some towns built around castles. These cities were only rarely protected by simple stone walls and more usually by a combination of both walls and ditches. From the 12th century AD hundreds of settlements of all sizes were founded all across Europe, which very often obtained the right of fortification soon afterwards. Several medieval town walls have survived into the modern age, such as the walled towns of Austria, walls of Tallinn, or the town walls of York and Canterbury in England, as well as Nordlingen, Dinkelsbühl, Berching and Rothenburg ob der Tauber in Germany. In Spain, Ávila and Tossa del Mar hosts surviving medieval walls while Lugo has an intact Roman wall.

In medieval warfare, town walls were often targeted for destruction, partly for their role in defence but also because of their role in shaping a settlement's identity, and archaeologist Giulia Bellato, notes "walls were the visible marker that defined a city as such and helped define its inhabitants as citizens".

The founding of urban centers was an important means of territorial expansion and many cities, especially in central and eastern Europe, were founded for this purpose during the period of Eastern settlement. These cities are easy to recognise due to their regular layout and large market spaces. The fortifications of these settlements were continuously improved to reflect the current level of military development.

=== Gunpowder era ===
==== Chinese city walls ====
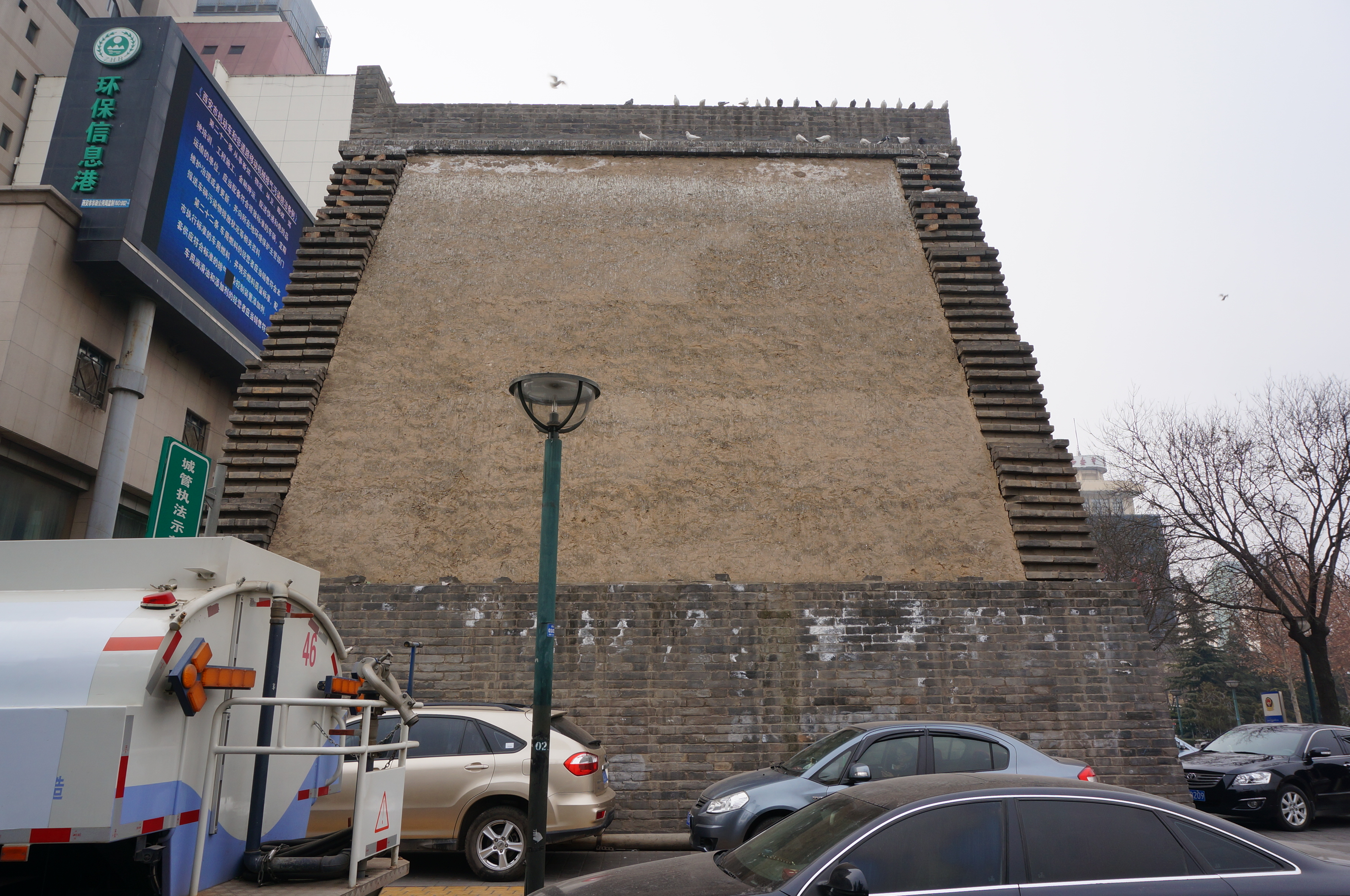
Remains of a defensive wall of Prince Qin Mansion, a citadel within Xi'an

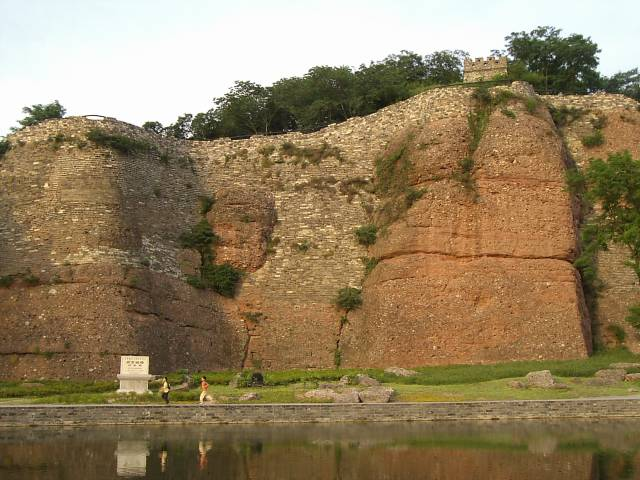
The Stone City is a wall in Nanjing dated to the Six Dynasties (220～589). Almost all of the original city is gone, but portions of the city wall remain. Not to be confused with the City Wall of Nanjing.

While gunpowder and cannons were invented in China, China never developed wall breaking artillery to the same extent as other parts of the world. Part of the reason is probably because Chinese walls were already highly resistant to artillery and discouraged increasing the size of cannons. In the mid-twentieth century a European expert in fortification commented on their immensity: "in China ... the principal towns are surrounded to the present day by walls so substantial, lofty, and formidable that the medieval fortifications of Europe are puny in comparison." Chinese walls were thick. The eastern wall of Ancient Linzi, established in 859 BC, had a maximum thickness of 43 metres and an average thickness of 20–30 metres. Ming prefectural and provincial capital walls were 10 to 20 metres (33 to 66 ft) thick at the base and 5 to 10 metres (16 to 33 ft) at the top.

In Europe the height of wall construction was reached under the Roman Empire, whose walls often reached 10 metres (33 ft) in height, the same as many Chinese city walls, but were only 1.5 to 2.5 metres (4 ft 11 in to 8 ft 2 in) thick. Rome's Servian Walls reached 3.6 and 4 metres (12 and 13 ft) in thickness and 6 to 10 metres (20 to 33 ft) in height. Other fortifications also reached these specifications across the empire, but all these paled in comparison to contemporary Chinese walls, which could reach a thickness of 20 metres (66 ft) at the base in extreme cases. Even the walls of Constantinople which have been described as "the most famous and complicated system of defence in the civilized world," could not match up to a major Chinese city wall. Had both the outer and inner walls of Constantinople been combined they would have only reached roughly a bit more than a third the width of a major wall in China. According to Philo the width of a wall had to be 4.5 metres (15 ft) thick to be able to withstand ancient (non-gunpowder) siege engines. European walls of the 1200s and 1300s could reach the Roman equivalents but rarely exceeded them in length, width, and height, remaining around 2 metres (6 ft 7 in) thick. When referring to a very thick wall in medieval Europe, what is usually meant is a wall of 2.5 metres (8 ft 2 in) in width, which would have been considered thin in a Chinese context. There are some exceptions such as the Hillfort of Otzenhausen, a Celtic ringfort with a thickness of 40 metres (130 ft) in some parts, but Celtic fort-building practices died out in the early medieval period. Andrade goes on to note that the walls of the marketplace of Chang'an were thicker than the walls of major European capitals.

Aside from their immense size, Chinese walls were also structurally different from the ones built in medieval Europe. Whereas European walls were mostly constructed of stone interspersed with gravel or rubble filling and bonded by limestone mortar, Chinese walls had tamped earthen cores which absorbed the energy of artillery shots. Walls were constructed using wooden frameworks which were filled with layers of earth tamped down to a highly compact state, and once that was completed the frameworks were removed for use in the next wall section. Starting from the Song dynasty these walls were improved with an outer layer of bricks or stone to prevent erosion, and during the Ming, earthworks were interspersed with stone and rubble. Most Chinese walls were also sloped rather than vertical to better deflect projectile energy.

The defensive response to cannon in Europe was to build relatively low and thick walls of packed earth, which could both withstand the force of cannon balls and support their own, defensive cannon. Chinese wall-building practice was, by happenstance, extremely resistant to all forms of battering. This held true into the twentieth century, when even modern explosive shells had some difficulty in breaking through tamped earth walls.

— Peter Lorge

The Chinese Wall Theory essentially rests on a cost benefit hypothesis, where the Ming recognized the highly resistant nature of their walls to structural damage, and could not imagine any affordable development of the guns available to them at the time to be capable of breaching said walls. Even as late as the 1490s a Florentine diplomat considered the French claim that "their artillery is capable of creating a breach in a wall of eight feet in thickness" to be ridiculous and the French "braggarts by nature". Very rarely did cannons blast breaches in city walls in Chinese warfare. This may have been partly due to cultural tradition. Famous military commanders such as Sun Tzu and Zheng Zhilong recommended not to directly attack cities and storm their walls. Even when direct assaults were made with cannons, it was usually by focusing on the gates rather than the walls. There were instances where cannons were used against walled fortifications, such as by Koxinga, but only in the case of small villages. During Koxinga's career, there is only one recorded case of capturing a settlement by bombarding its walls: the siege of Taizhou in 1658. In 1662, the Dutch found that bombarding the walls of a town in Fujian Province had no effect and they focused on the gates instead just as in Chinese warfare. In 1841, a 74-gun British warship bombarded a Chinese coastal fort near Guangzhou and found that it was "almost impervious to the efforts of horizontal fire." In fact twentieth century explosive shells had some difficulty creating a breach in tamped earthen walls.

We fought our way to Nanking and joined in the attack on the enemy capital in December. It was our unit which stormed the Chunghua Gate. We attacked continuously for about a week, battering the brick and earth walls with artillery, but they never collapsed. The night of December 11, men in my unit breached the wall. The morning came with most of our unit still behind us, but we were beyond the wall. Behind the gate great heaps of sandbags were piled up. We 'cleared them away, removed the lock, and opened the gates, with a great creaking noise. We'd done it! We'd opened the fortress! All the enemy ran away, so we didn't take any fire. The residents too were gone. When we passed beyond the fortress wall we thought we had occupied this city.

— Nohara Teishin, on the Japanese capture of Nanjing in 1937

==== Bastions and star forts ====
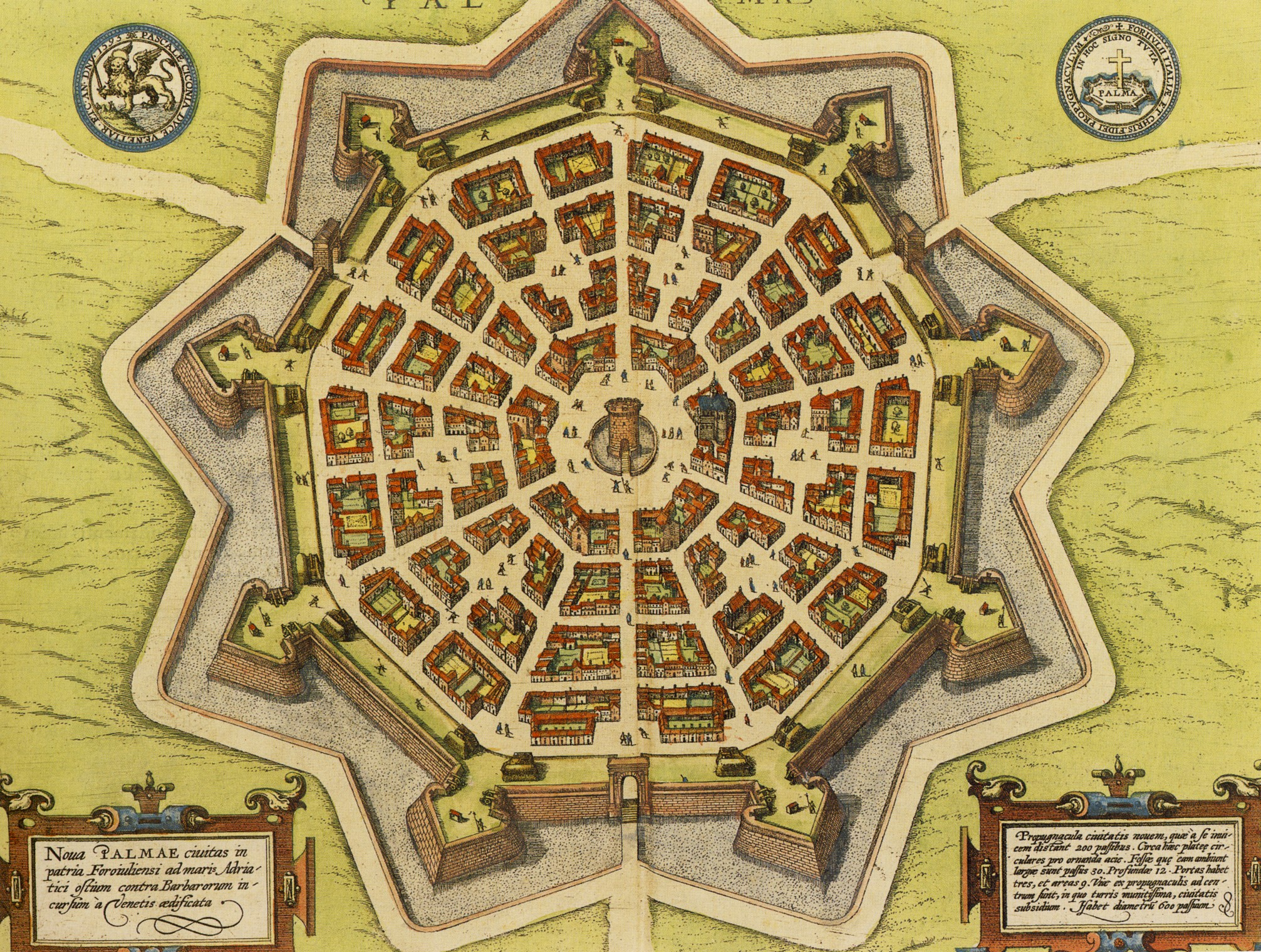
17th-century map of the city of Palmanova, Italy, an example of a Venetian star fort

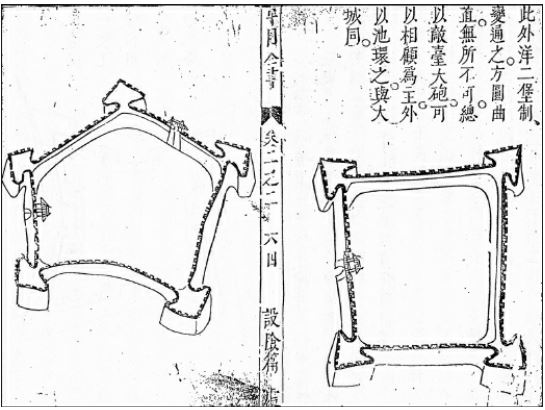
Chinese angled bastion fort, 1638

As a response to gunpowder artillery, European fortifications began displaying architectural principles such as lower and thicker walls in the mid-1400s. Cannon towers were built with artillery rooms where cannons could discharge fire from slits in the walls. However, this proved problematic as the slow rate of fire, reverberating concussions, and noxious fumes produced greatly hindered defenders. Gun towers also limited the size and number of cannon placements because the rooms could only be built so big. Notable surviving artillery towers include a seven layer defensive structure built in 1480 at Fougères in Brittany, and a four layer tower built in 1479 at Querfurth in Saxony.

The star fort, also known as the bastion fort, trace italienne, or renaissance fortress, was a style of fortification that became popular in Europe during the 16th century. The bastion and star fort was developed in Italy, where the Florentine engineer Giuliano da Sangallo (1445–1516) compiled a comprehensive defensive plan using the geometric bastion and full trace italienne that became widespread in Europe.

The main distinguishing features of the star fort were its angle bastions, each placed to support their neighbor with lethal crossfire, covering all angles, making them extremely difficult to engage with and attack. Angle bastions consisted of two faces and two flanks. Artillery positions positioned at the flanks could fire parallel into the opposite bastion's line of fire, thus providing two lines of cover fire against an armed assault on the wall, and preventing mining parties from finding refuge. Meanwhile, artillery positioned on the bastion platform could fire frontally from the two faces, also providing overlapping fire with the opposite bastion. Overlapping mutually supporting defensive fire was the greatest advantage enjoyed by the star fort. As a result, sieges lasted longer and became more difficult affairs. By the 1530s the bastion fort had become the dominant defensive structure in Italy.

Outside Europe, the star fort became an "engine of European expansion," and acted as a force multiplier so that small European garrisons could hold out against numerically superior forces. Wherever star forts were erected the natives experienced great difficulty in uprooting European invaders.

In China, Sun Yuanhua advocated for the construction of angled bastion forts in his Xifashenji so that their cannons could better support each other. The officials Han Yun and Han Lin noted that cannons on square forts could not support each side as well as bastion forts. Their efforts to construct bastion forts, and their results, were limited. Ma Weicheng built two bastion forts in his home county, which helped fend off a Qing incursion in 1638. By 1641, there were ten bastion forts in the county. Before bastion forts could spread any further, the Ming dynasty fell in 1644, and they were largely forgotten as the Qing dynasty was on the offensive most of the time and had no use for them.

=== Decline ===
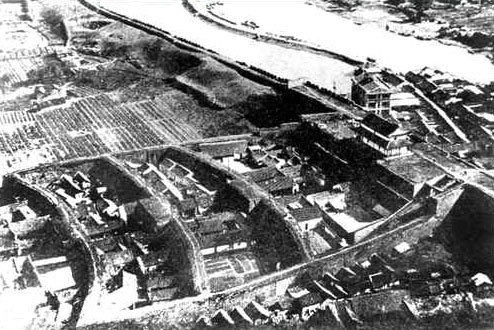
Multiple barbicans of Tongji Gate, Nanjing

In the wake of city growth and the ensuing change of defensive strategy, focusing more on the defense of forts around cities, many city walls were demolished. Also, the invention of gunpowder rendered walls less effective, as siege cannons could then be used to blast through walls, allowing armies to simply march through. Today, the presence of former city fortifications can often only be deduced from the presence of ditches, ring roads or parks.

Furthermore, some street names hint at the presence of fortifications in times past, for example when words such as "wall" or "glacis" occur.

In the 19th century, less emphasis was placed on preserving the fortifications for the sake of their architectural or historical value – on the one hand, complete fortifications were restored (Carcassonne), on the other hand many structures were demolished in an effort to modernize the cities. One exception to this is the "monument preservation" law by the Bavarian King Ludwig I of Bavaria, which led to the nearly complete preservation of many monuments such as the Rothenburg ob der Tauber, Nördlingen, Berching and Dinkelsbühl. The countless small fortified towns in the Franconia region were also preserved as a consequence of this edict.

=== Modern era ===
Walls and fortified wall structures were still built in the modern era. They did not, however, have the original purpose of being a structure able to resist a prolonged siege or bombardment. Modern examples of defensive walls include:

- Berlin's city wall from the 1730s to the 1860s was partially made of wood. Its primary purpose was to enable the city to impose tolls on goods and, secondarily, also served to prevent the desertion of soldiers from the garrison in Berlin.
- The Berlin Wall (1961 to 1989) was built around West Berlin by the German Democratic Republic to prevent its citizens from fleeing to the West German exclave.
- The Korean Demilitarized Zone that divides North Korea and South Korea near the 38th parallel north.
- The Nicosia Wall along the Green Line divides North and South Cyprus.
- In the 20th century and after, many enclaved Jewish settlements in Israeli occupied territory in the West Bank were and are surrounded by fortified walls
- Mexico–United States barrier, a wall advocated by U.S. President Donald Trump for the Mexico–United States border to prevent illegal immigration, drug smuggling, human trafficking, and entry of potential terrorists
- Belfast, Northern Ireland by the "peace lines".
- Gaza–Israel barrier, first constructed by Israel in 1971 as a security barrier and has been rebuilt and upgraded since. The barrier has been effective in preventing terrorists and suicide bombers from entering Israel from Gaza.
- Gated communities are modern residential neighborhoods where access is controlled, often prohibiting through-travelers or non-residents via a wall and guards

Additionally, in some countries, different embassies may be grouped together in a single "embassy district", enclosed by a fortified complex with walls and towers – this usually occurs in regions where the embassies run a high risk of being target of attacks. An early example of such a compound was the Legation Quarter in Beijing in the late 19th and early 20th centuries.

Most of these modern city walls are made of steel and concrete. Vertical concrete plates are put together so as to allow the least space in between them, and are rooted firmly in the ground. The top of the wall is often protruding and beset with barbed wire in order to make climbing them more difficult. These walls are usually built in straight lines and covered by watchtowers at the corners. Double walls with an interstitial "zone of fire", as the former Berlin Wall had, are now rare.

In September 2014, Ukraine announced the construction of the "European Rampart" alongside its border with Russia to be able to successfully apply for a visa-free movement with the European Union.

Modern defensive walls
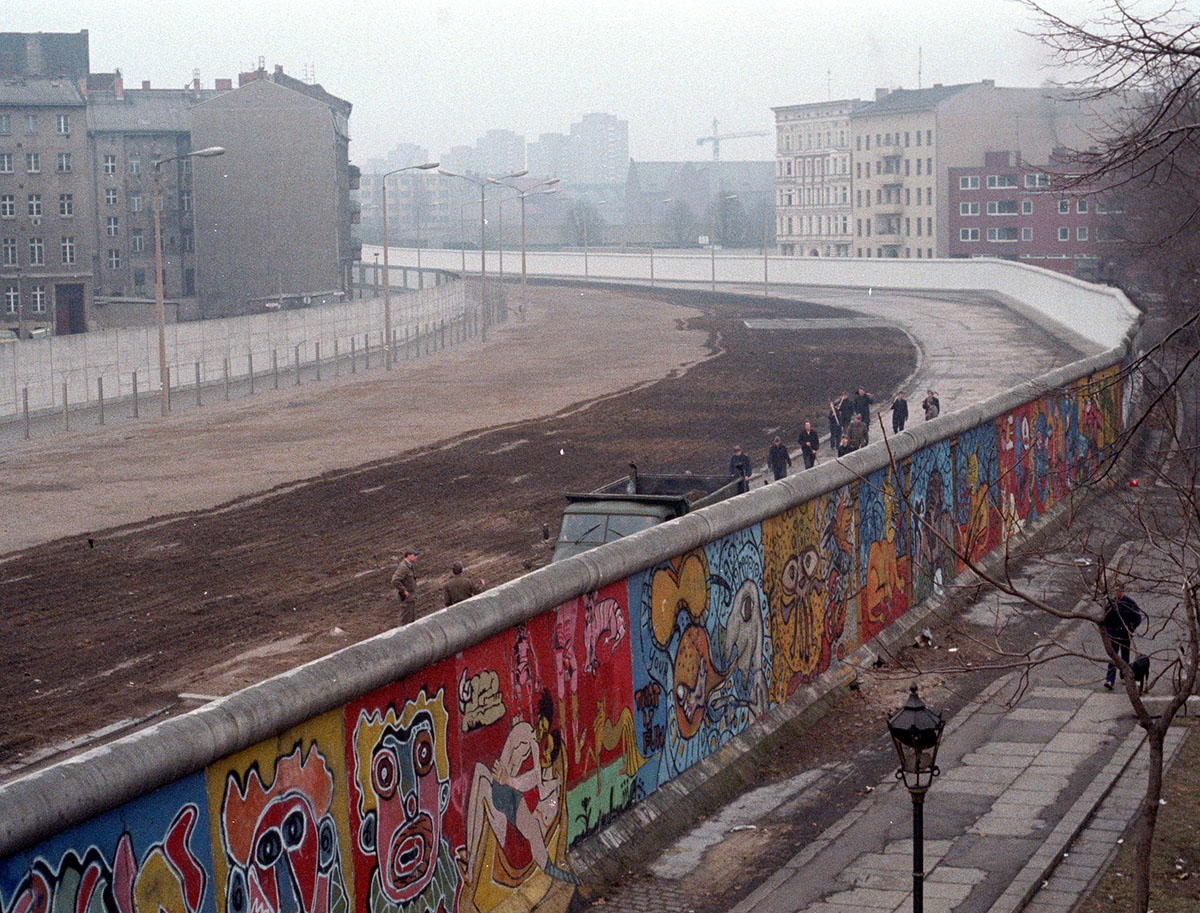
A view of the Berlin Wall in 1986

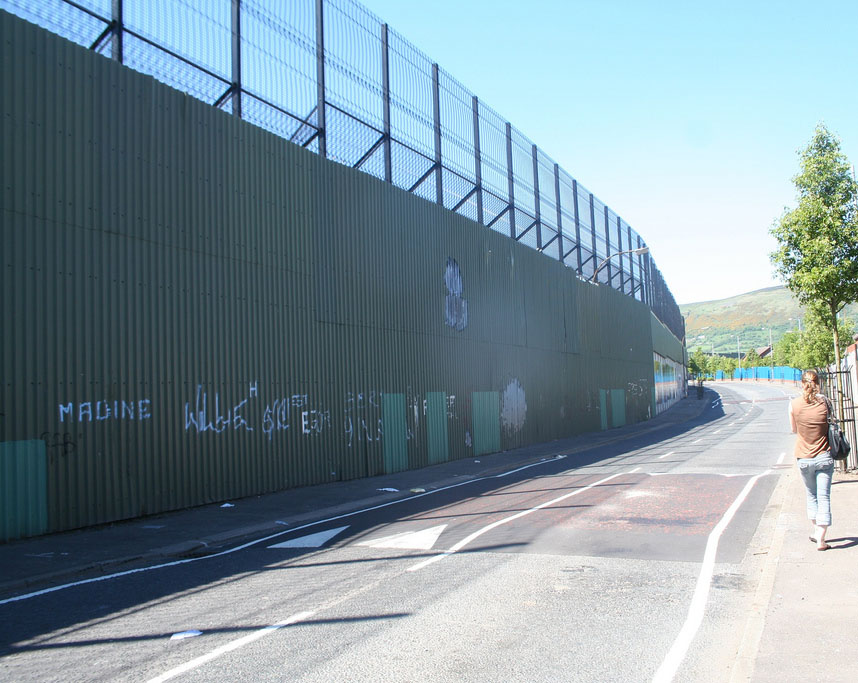
A "peace line" in Belfast, Northern Ireland

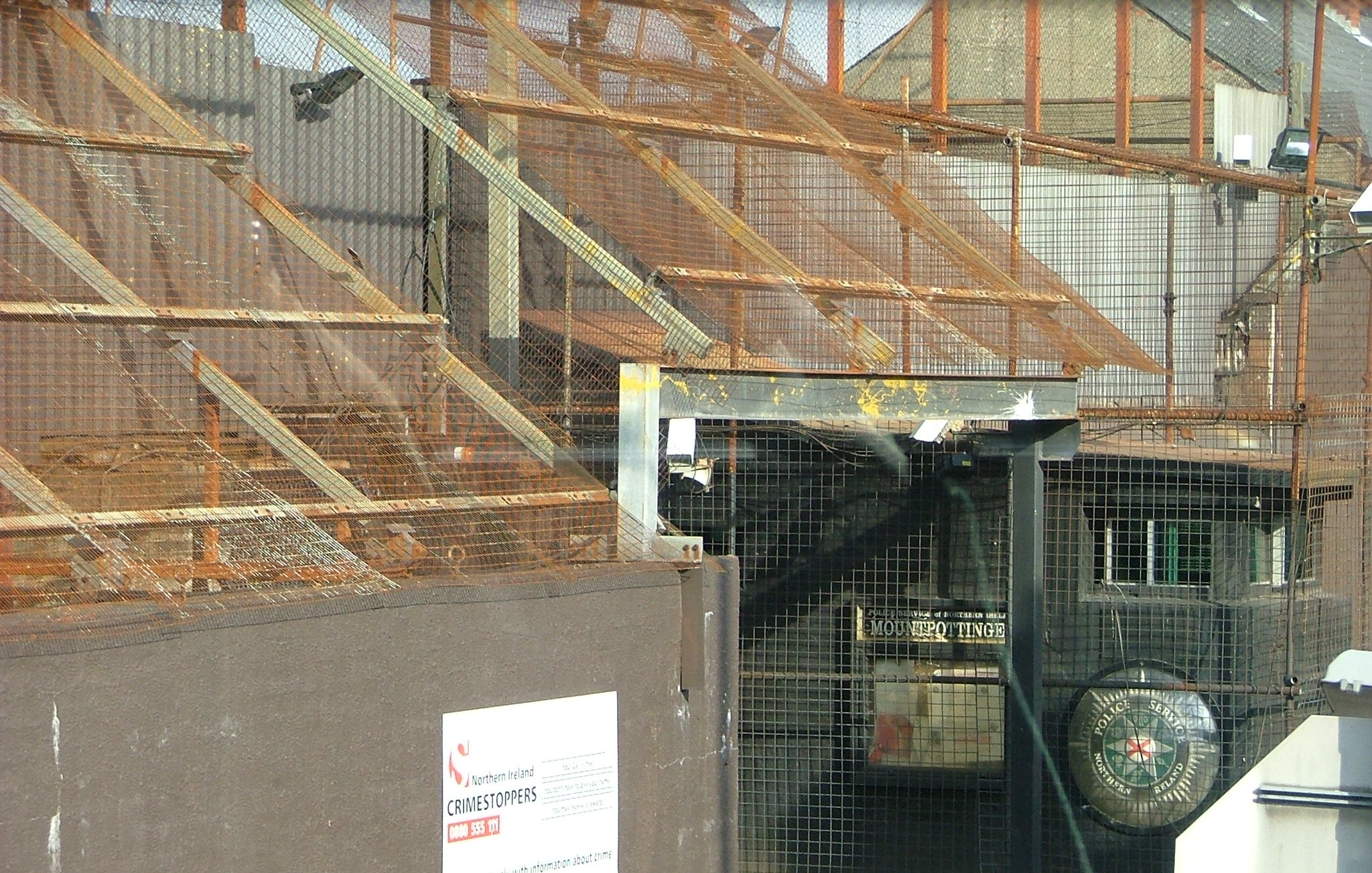
The fortified wall of a police station in Belfast, Northern Ireland

== Composition ==
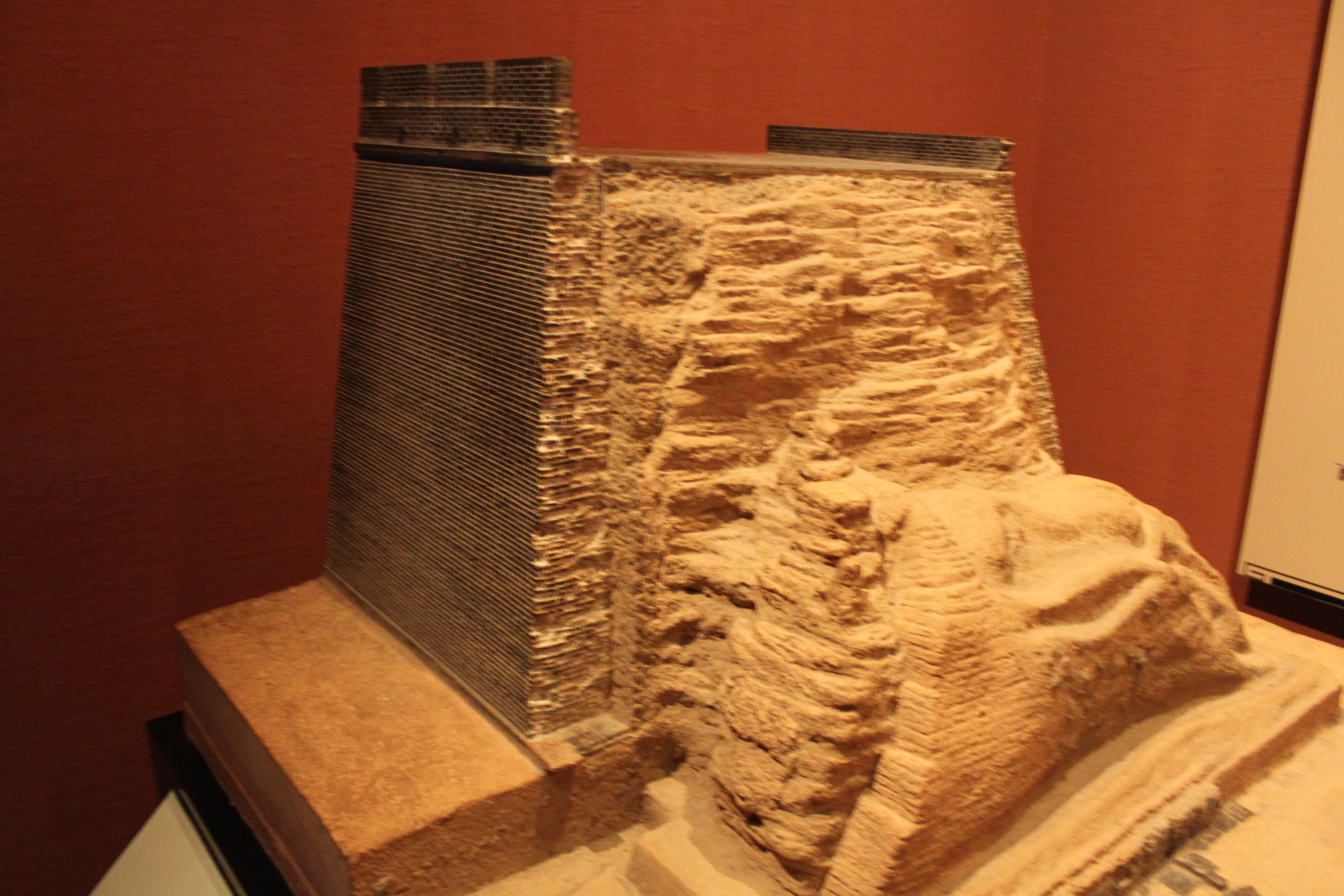
A model of a typical Chinese city wall

At its simplest, a defensive wall consists of a wall enclosure and its gates. For the most part, the top of the walls were accessible, with the outside of the walls having tall parapets with embrasures or merlons. North of the Alps, this passageway at the top of the walls occasionally had a roof.

In addition to this, many different enhancements were made over the course of the centuries:

- City ditch: a ditch dug in front of the walls, occasionally filled with water to form a moat.
- Gate tower: a tower built next to, or on top of the city gates to better defend the city gates.
- Wall tower: a tower built on top of a segment of the wall, which usually extended outwards slightly, so as to be able to observe the exterior of the walls on either side. In addition to arrow slits, ballistae, catapults and cannons could be mounted on top for extra defence.
- Pre-wall: wall built outside the wall proper, usually of lesser height – the space in between was usually further subdivided by additional walls.
- Additional obstacles in front of the walls.

The defensive towers of west and south European fortifications in the Middle Ages were often very regularly and uniformly constructed (cf. Ávila, Provins), whereas Central European city walls tend to show a variety of different styles. In these cases the gate and wall towers often reach up to considerable heights, and gates equipped with two towers on either side are much rarer. Apart from having a purely military and defensive purpose, towers also played a representative and artistic role in the conception of a fortified complex. The architecture of the city thus competed with that of the castle of the noblemen and city walls were often a manifestation of the pride of a particular city.

Urban areas outside the city walls, so-called Vorstädte, were often enclosed by their own set of walls and integrated into the defense of the city. These areas were often inhabited by the poorer population and held the "noxious trades". In many cities, a new wall was built once the city had grown outside of the old wall. This can often still be seen in the layout of the city, for example in Nördlingen, and sometimes even a few of the old gate towers are preserved, such as the white tower in Nuremberg. Additional constructions prevented the circumvention of the city, through which many important trade routes passed, thus ensuring that tolls were paid when the caravans passed through the city gates, and that the local market was visited by the trade caravans. Furthermore, additional signaling and observation towers were frequently built outside the city, and were sometimes fortified in a castle-like fashion. The border of the area of influence of the city was often partially or fully defended by elaborate ditches, walls and hedges. The crossing points were usually guarded by gates or gate houses. These defenses were regularly checked by riders, who often also served as the gate keepers. Long stretches of these defenses can still be seen to this day, and even some gates are still intact. To further protect their territory, rich cities also established castles in their area of influence. An example of this practice is the Romanian Bran Castle, which was intended to protect nearby Kronstadt (today's Braşov).

The city walls were often connected to the fortifications of hill castles via additional walls. Thus the defenses were made up of city and castle fortifications taken together. Several examples of this are preserved, for example in Germany Hirschhorn on the Neckar, Königsberg and Pappenheim, Franken, Burghausen in Oberbayern and many more. A few castles were more directly incorporated into the defensive strategy of the city (e.g. Nuremberg, Zons, Carcassonne), or the cities were directly outside the castle as a sort of "pre-castle" (Coucy-le-Chateau, Conwy and others). Larger cities often had multiple stewards – for example Augsburg was divided into a Reichstadt and a clerical city. These different parts were often separated by their own fortifications.

=== Dimensions of famous city walls ===
Wall	Max width (m)	Minimum width (m)	Max height (m)	Lowest height (m)	Length (km)
Aurelian Walls	3.5		16	8	19
Ávila	3		12		2.5
Baghdad	45	12	30	18	7
Beijing (inner)	20	12	15		24
Beijing (outer)	15	4.5	7	6	28
Carcassonne	3		8	6	3
Chang'an	16	12	12		26
Dubrovnik	6	1.5	25		1.9
Forbidden City	8.6	6.6	8		
Harar			5		3.5
Itchan Kala	6	5	10		2
Jerusalem	2.5		12		4
Khanbaliq			10.6		
Linzi	42	26			
Luoyang	25		11		12
Marrakech	2		9		20
Nanjing	19.75	7	26		25.1
Nicaea	3.7		9		5
Pingyao	12	3	10	8	6
Seoul (Hanyang doseong)	5	3.7	8	5	18.627
Servian Wall	4	3.6	10	6	11
Suwon (Hwaseong)	1.4	1.2	6	4	5.74
Suzhou	11	5	7		
Theodosian Walls (inner)	5.25		12		6
Theodosian Walls (outer)	2		9	8.5	6
Vatican	2.5		8		3
Visby	2.6		11	4.5	3.4
Xi'an	18	12	12		14
Xiangyang			10.8		7.3
Zhongdu			12		24

== Gallery ==
=== Africa ===
African defensive walls
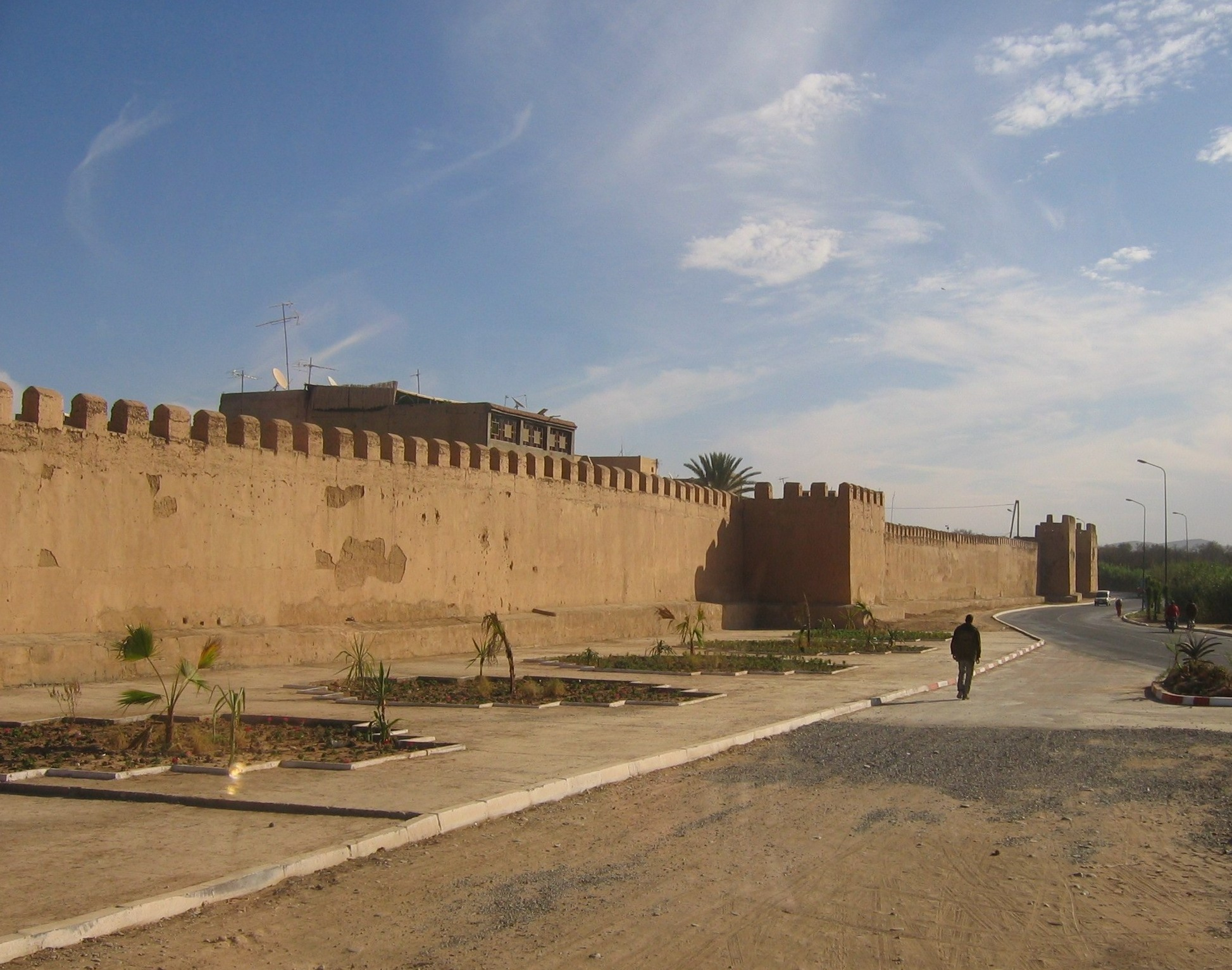
A defensive wall in Taroudannt, Morocco

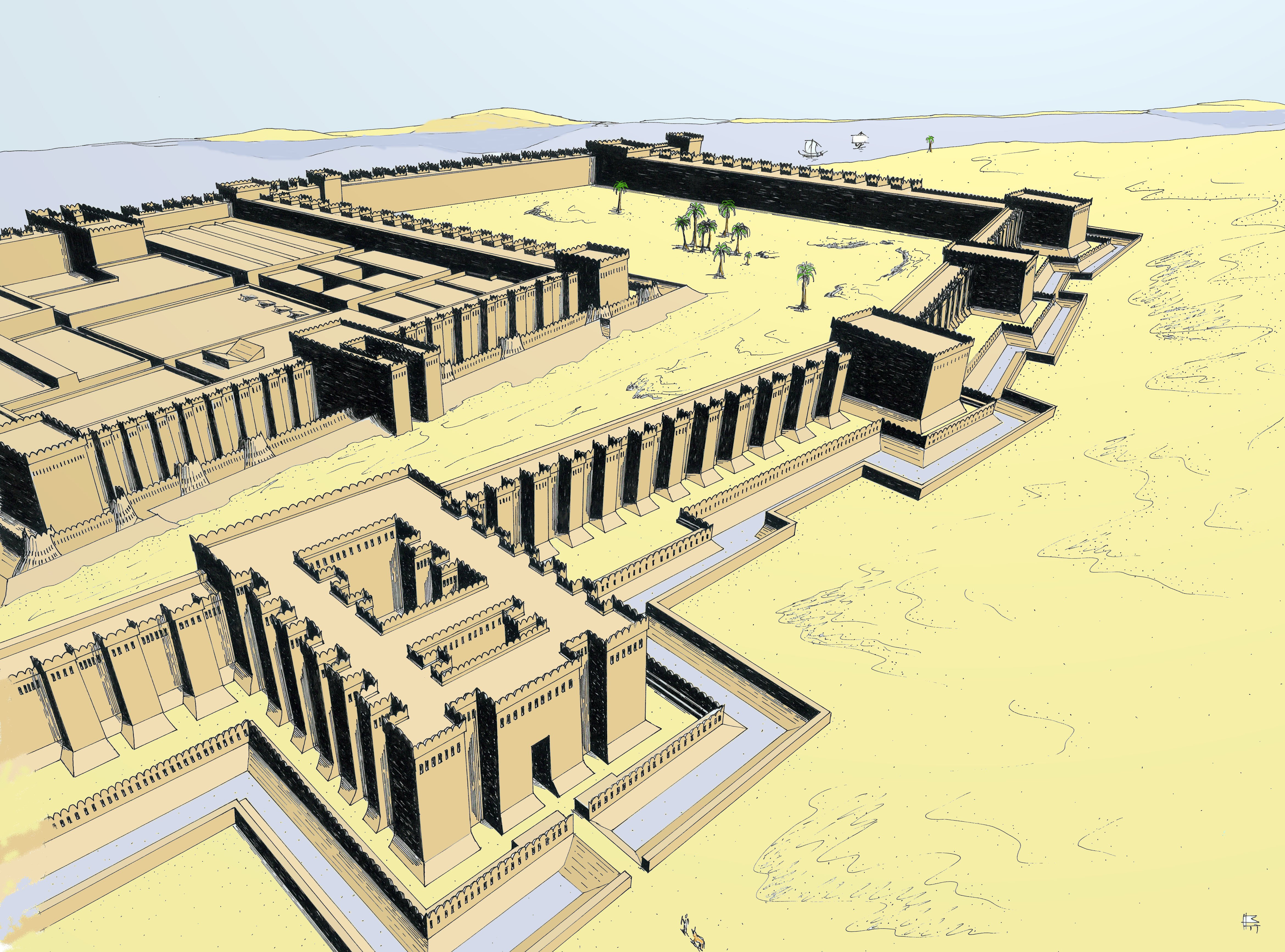
Defensive walls around the ancient Egyptian settlement of Buhen

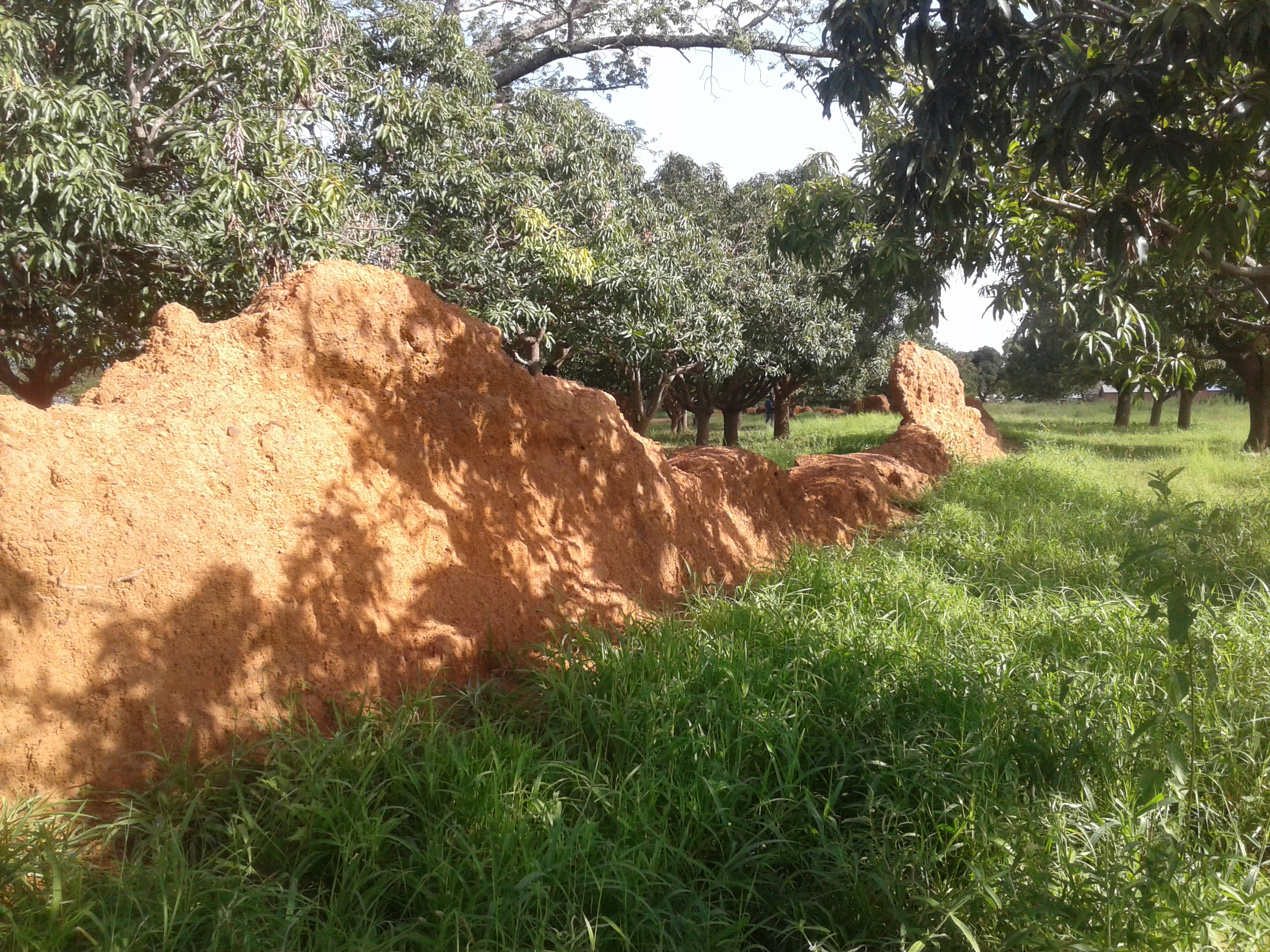
Remains of Naa Zaringa defense wall in Ghana

=== Americas ===
American defensive walls
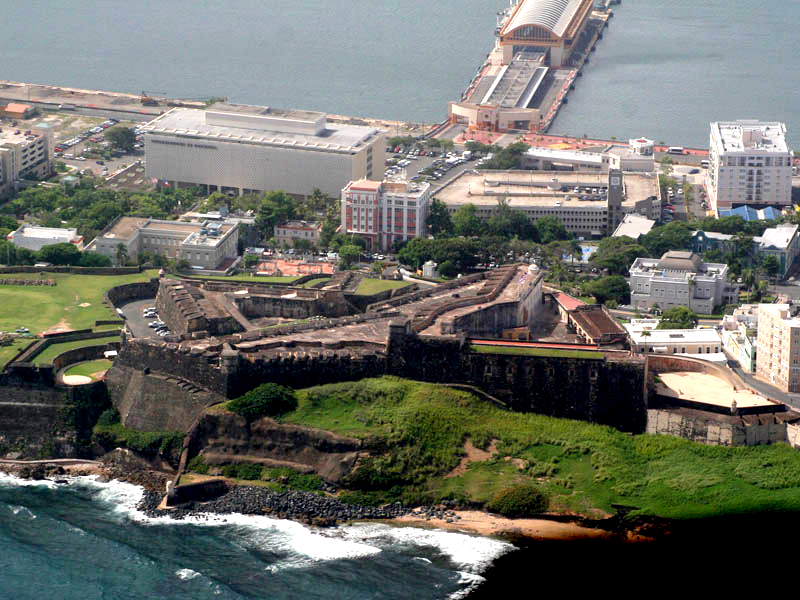
Castillo San Cristóbal in San Juan, Puerto Rico, a UNESCO World Heritage Site

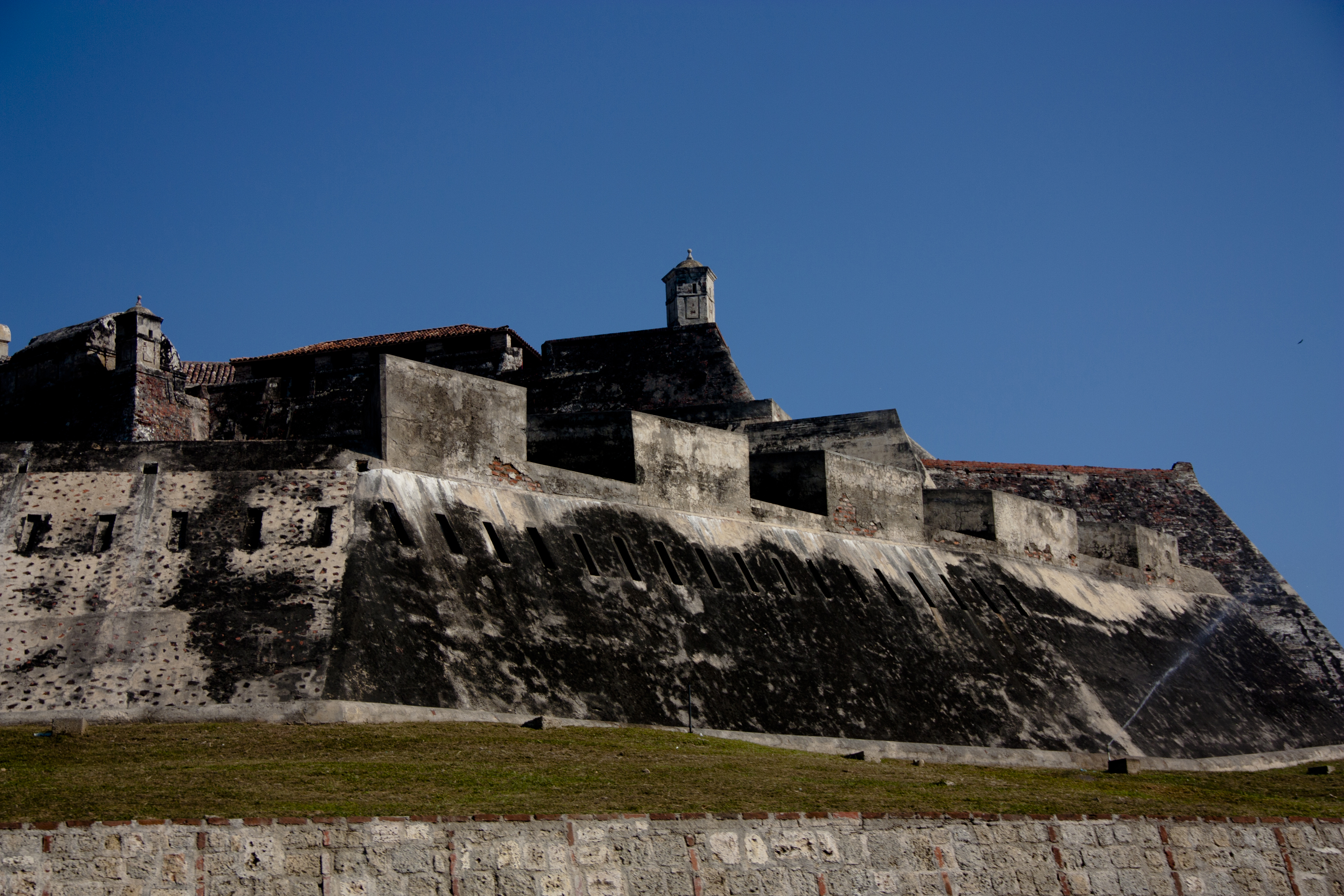
Defensive wall in Cartagena, Colombia

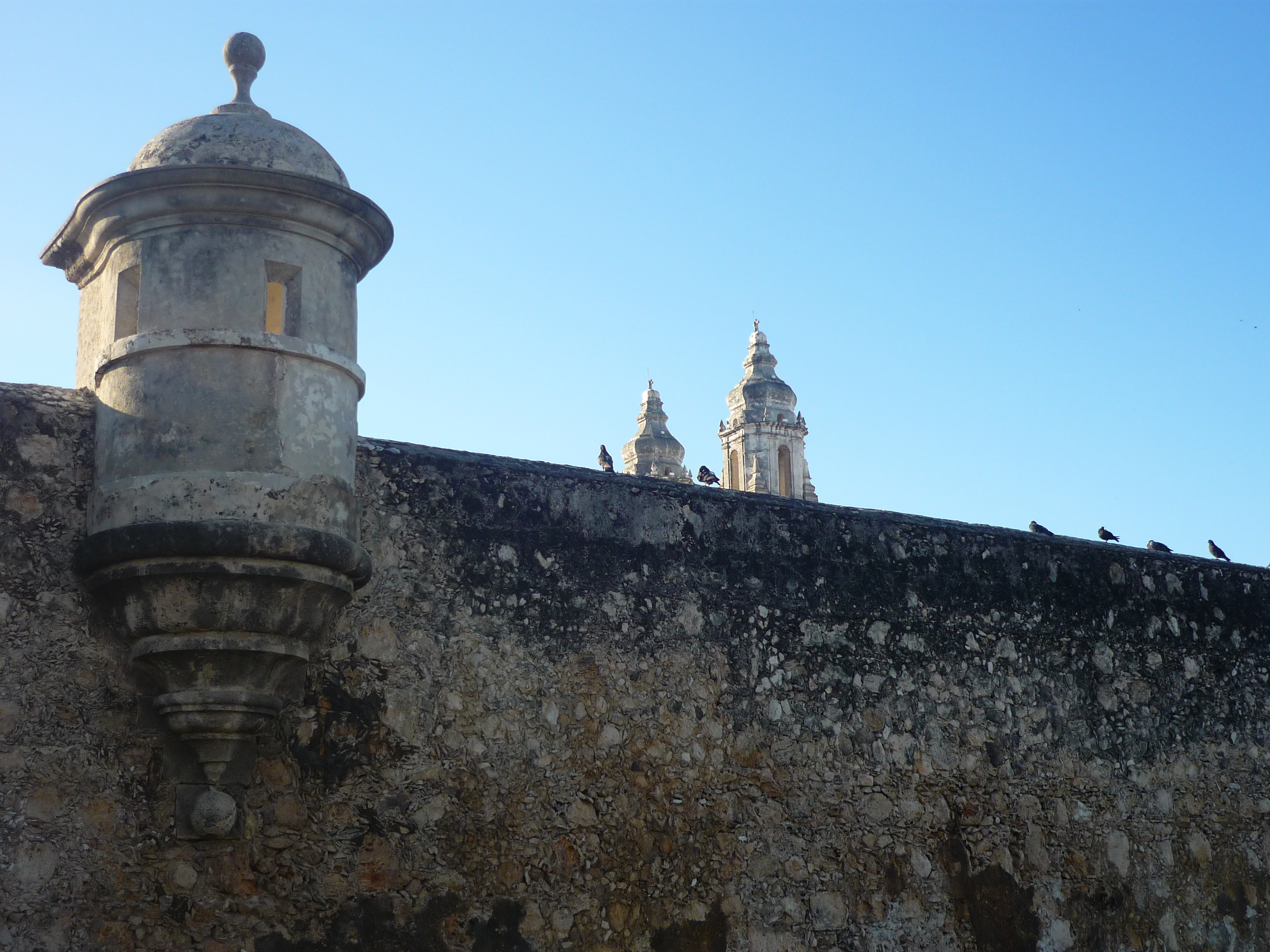
Part of the wall in San Francisco de Campeche, a UNESCO World Heritage Site

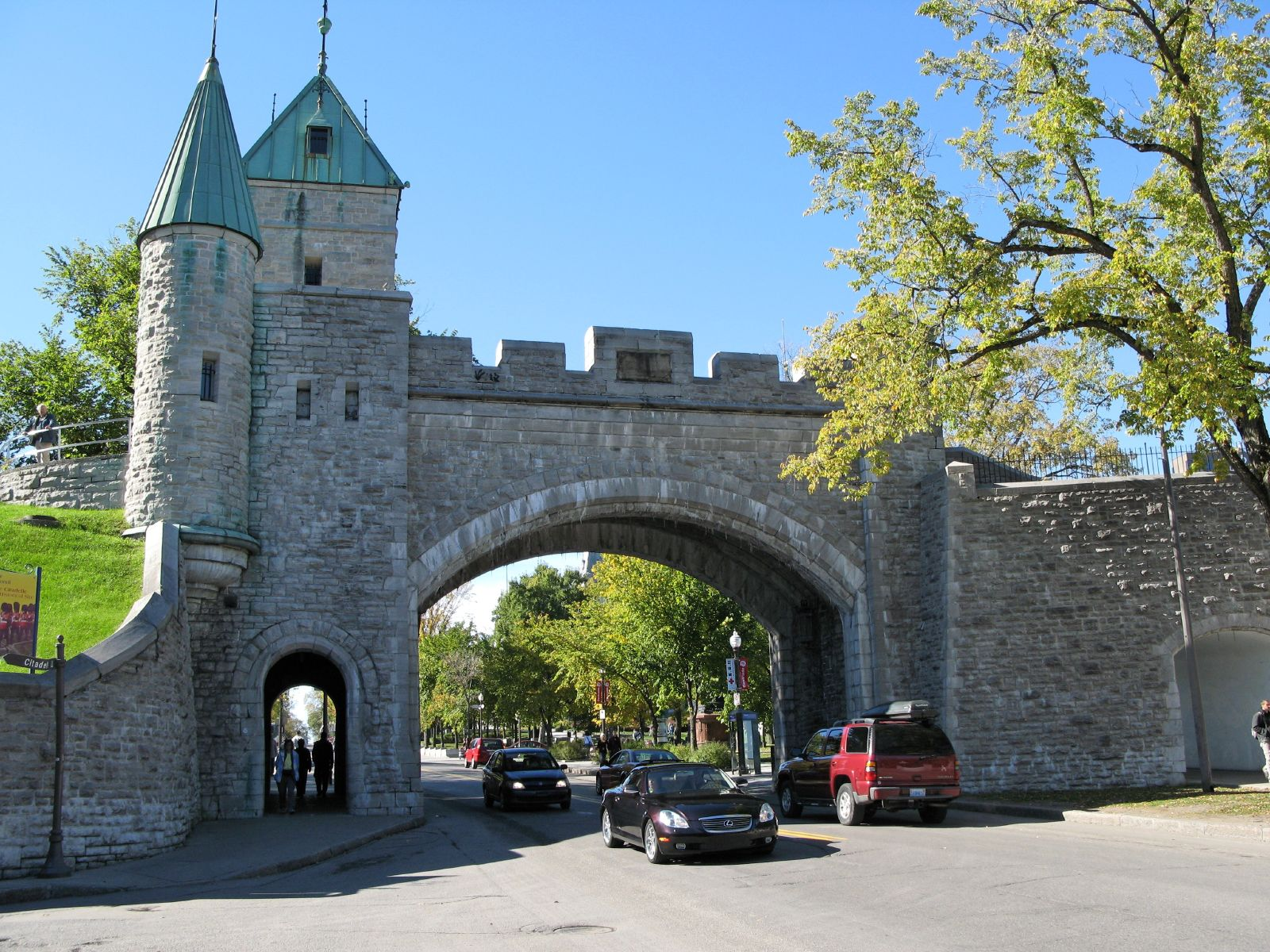
Porte St. Louis, part of Ramparts of Quebec City, the only remaining fortified city walls in North America north of Mexico

=== Asia ===
Asian defensive walls
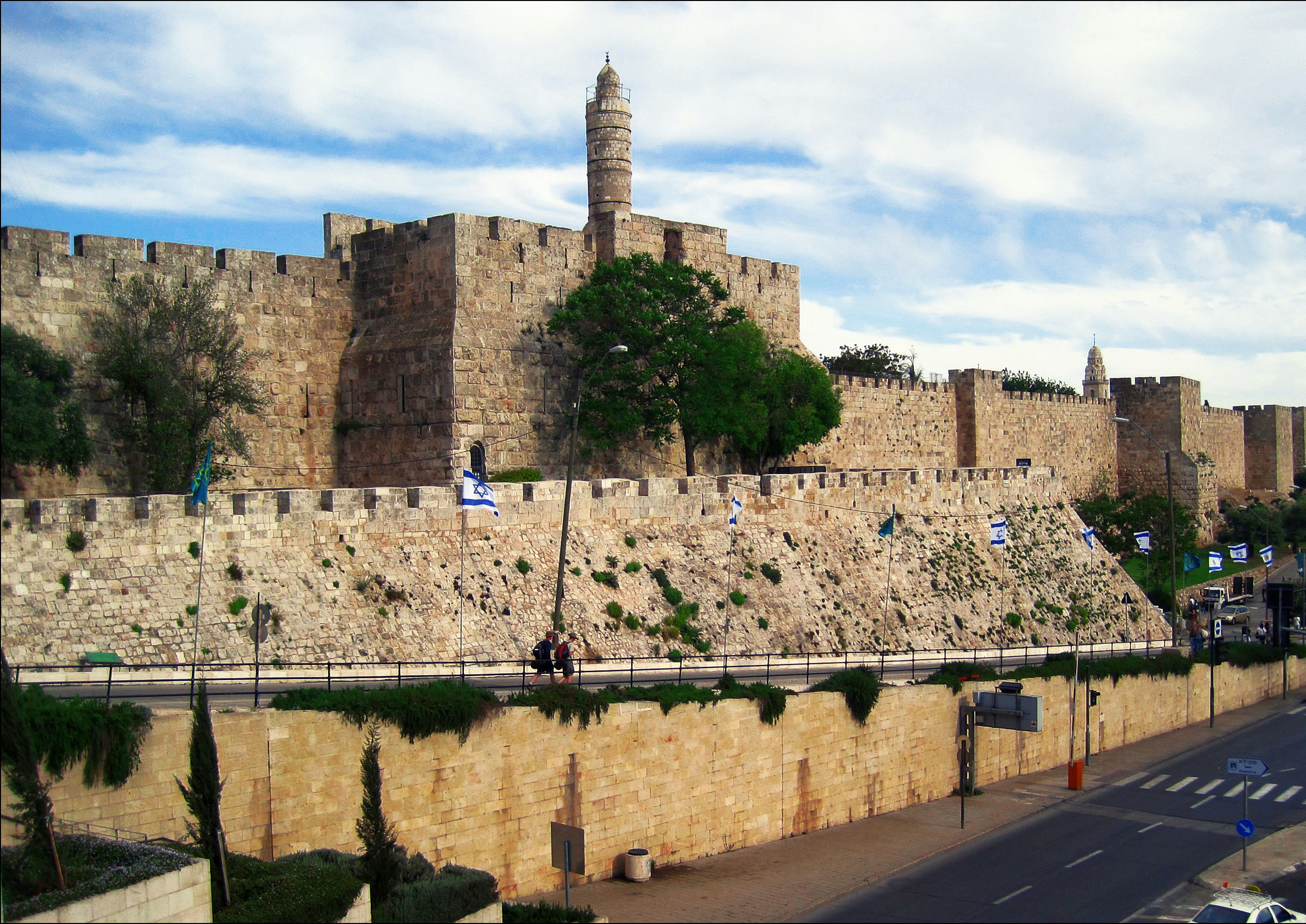
Walls of Jerusalem, Jerusalem, Israel

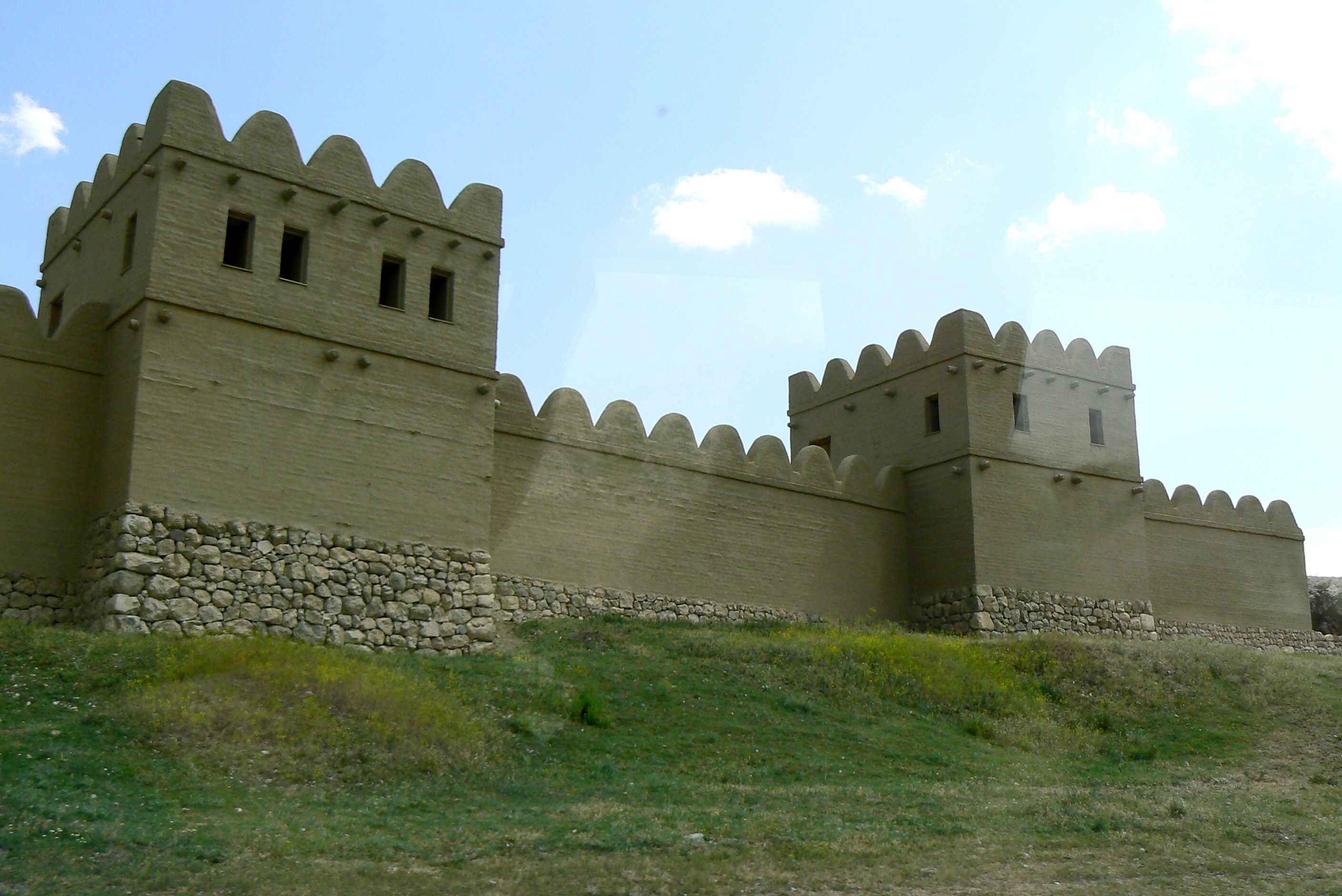
Wall of Hittite Capital Hattusa (reconstruction)

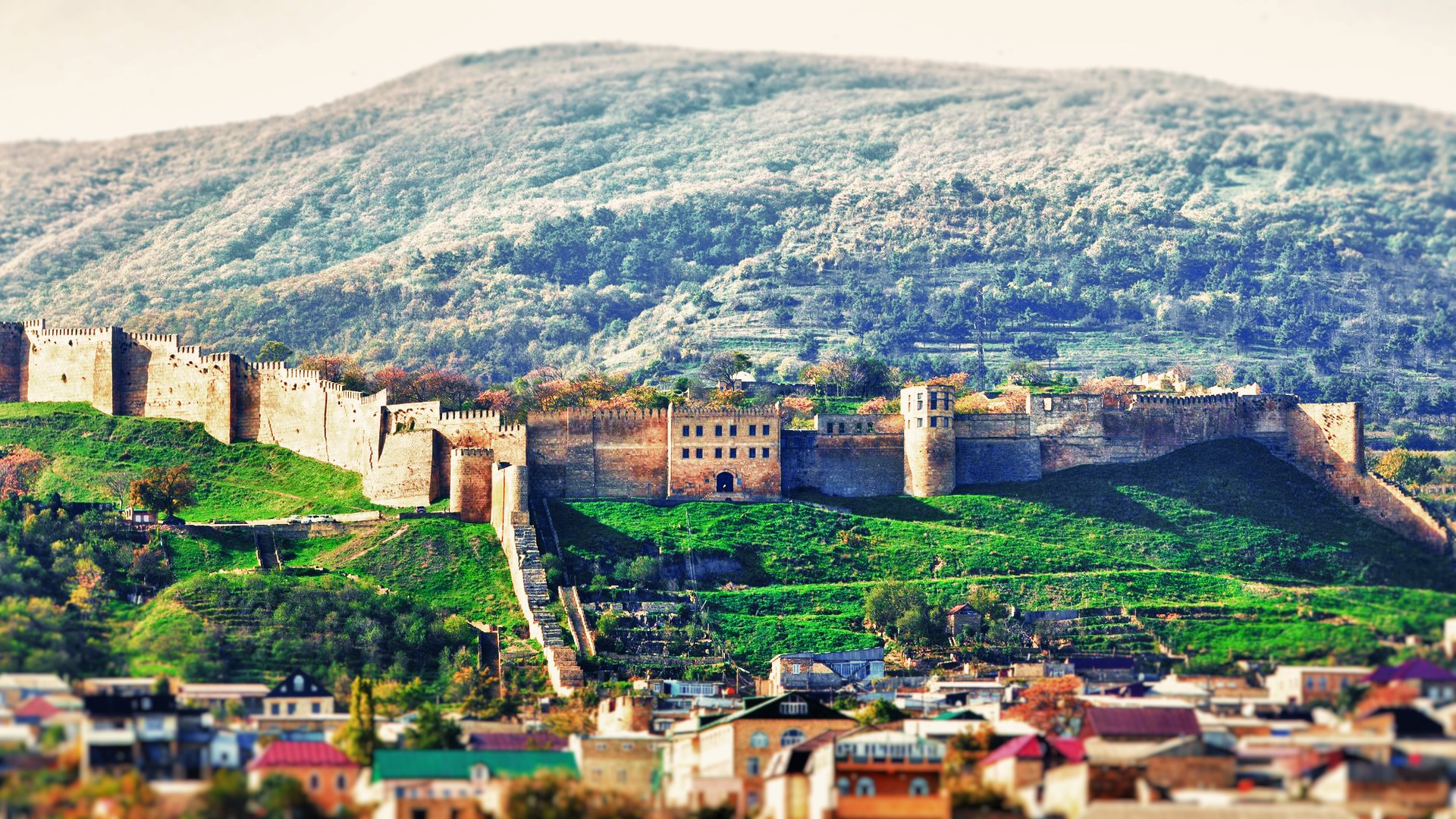
Derbent Walls, late Sassanian period

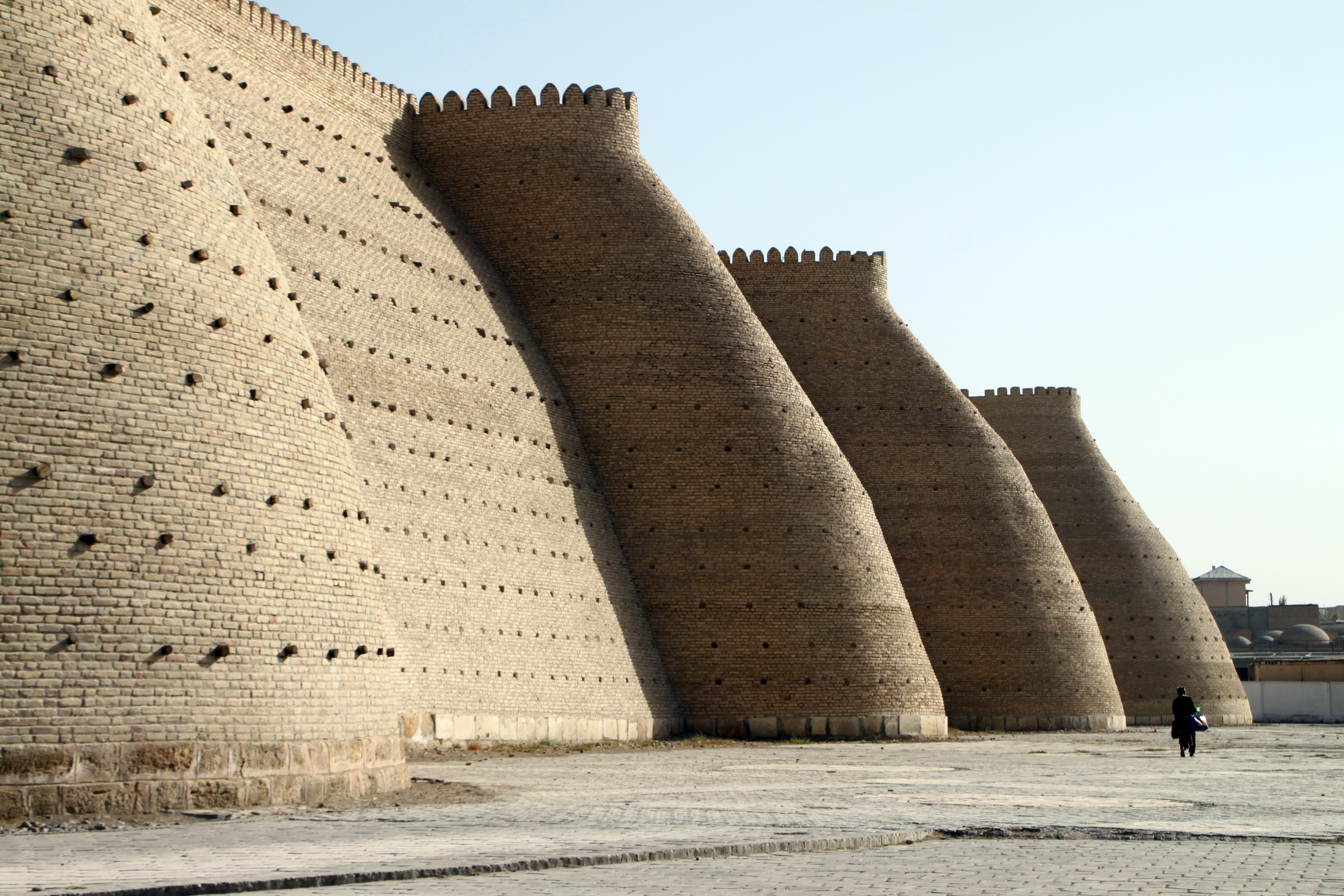
Walls of the Ark of Bukhara

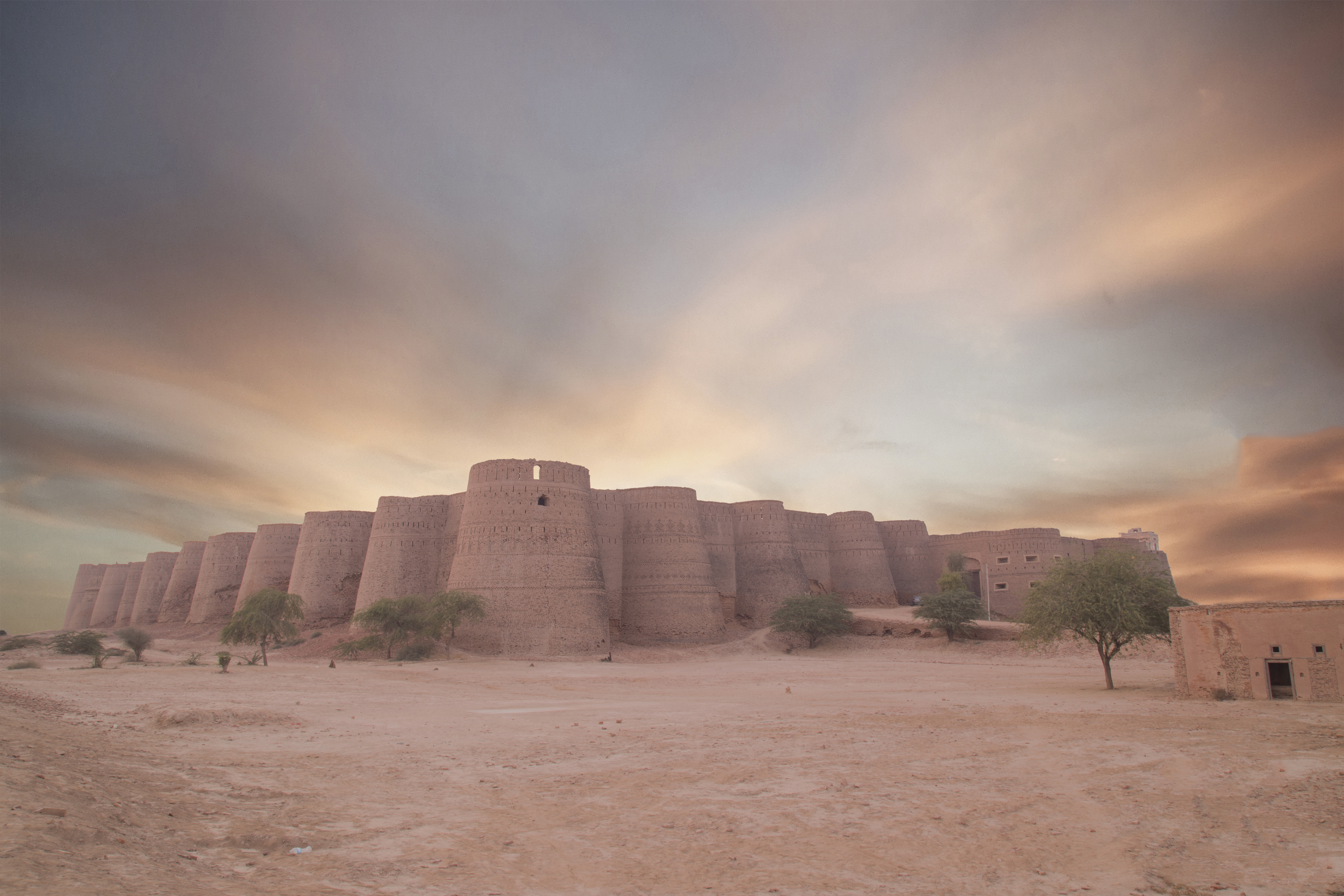
Derawar Wall located in Bahawalpur, Pakistan

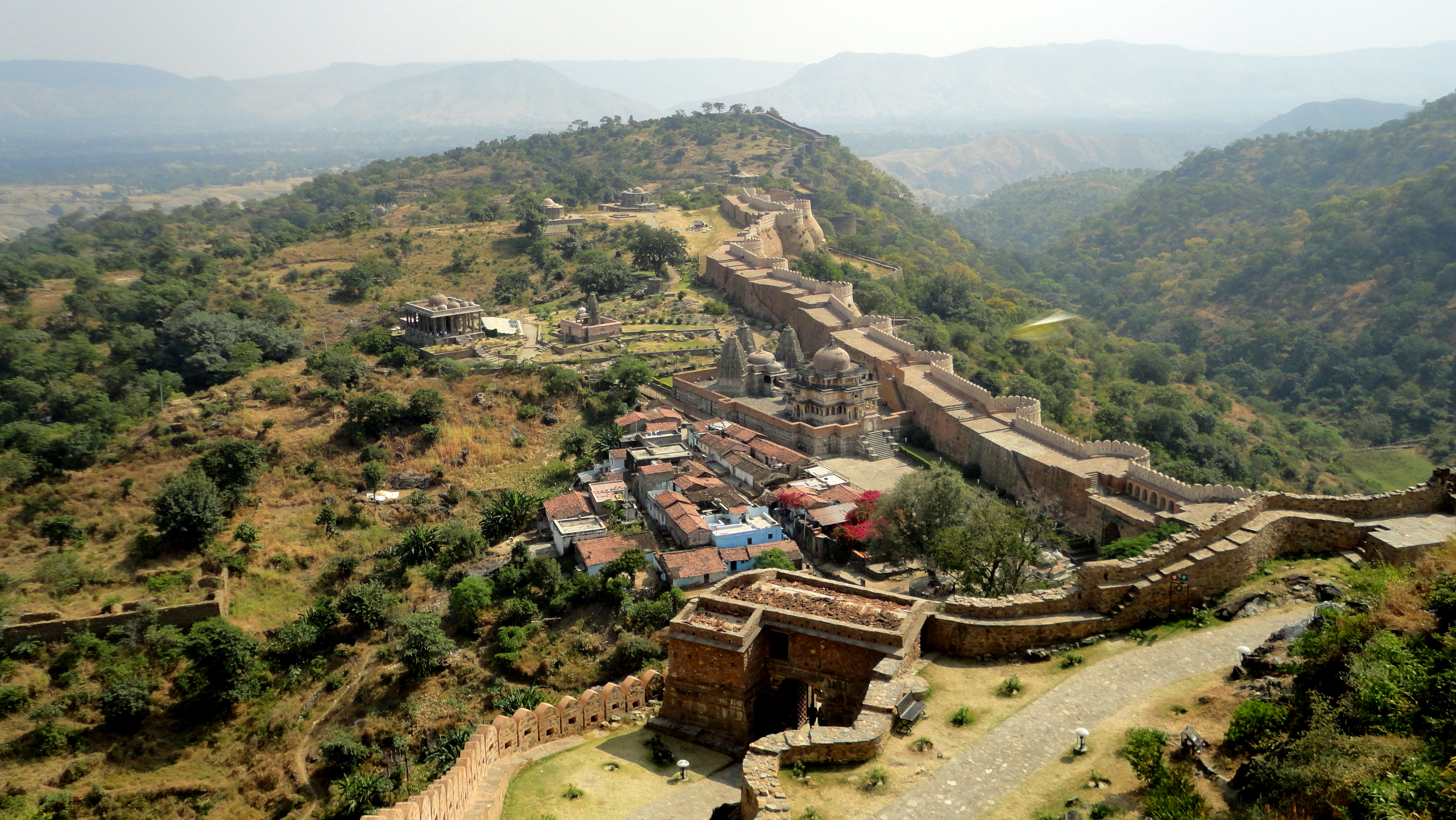
Walls of Kumbhalgarh Fort

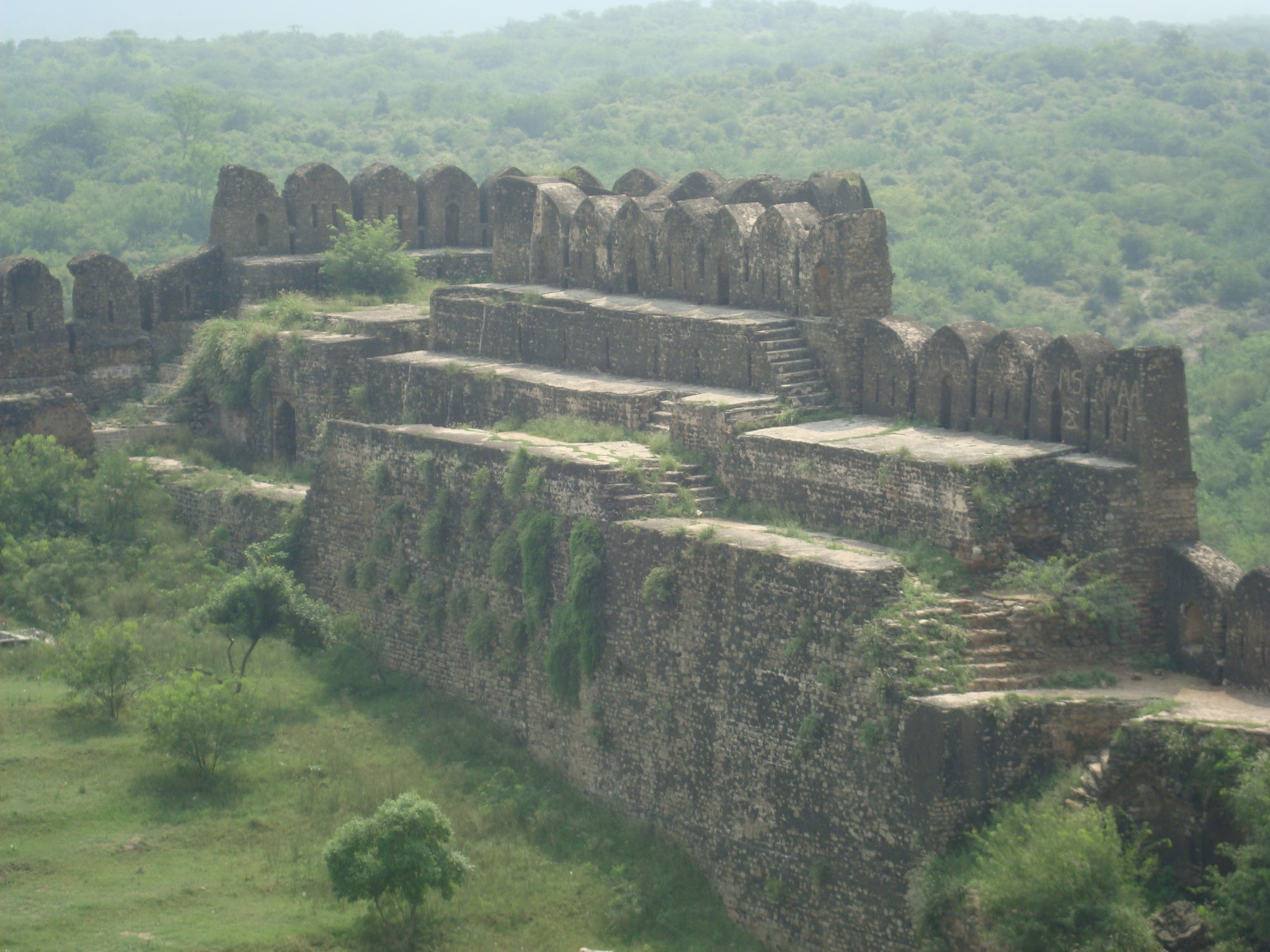
Walls of the Rohtas Fort

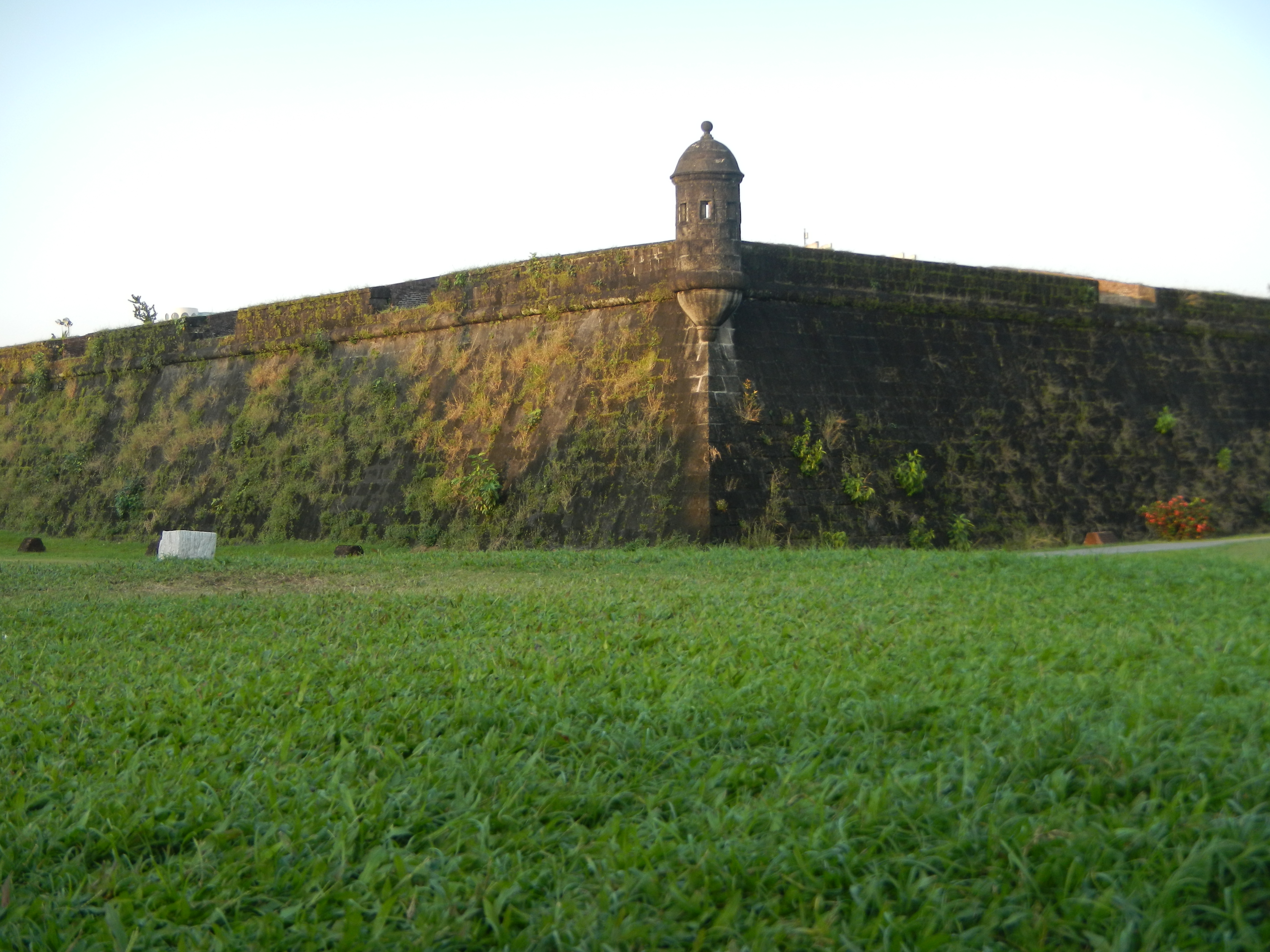
The defensive walls of Intramuros, the "Walled City" of old Manila, Philippines

==== Archaeological Citadel of Erbil wall ====
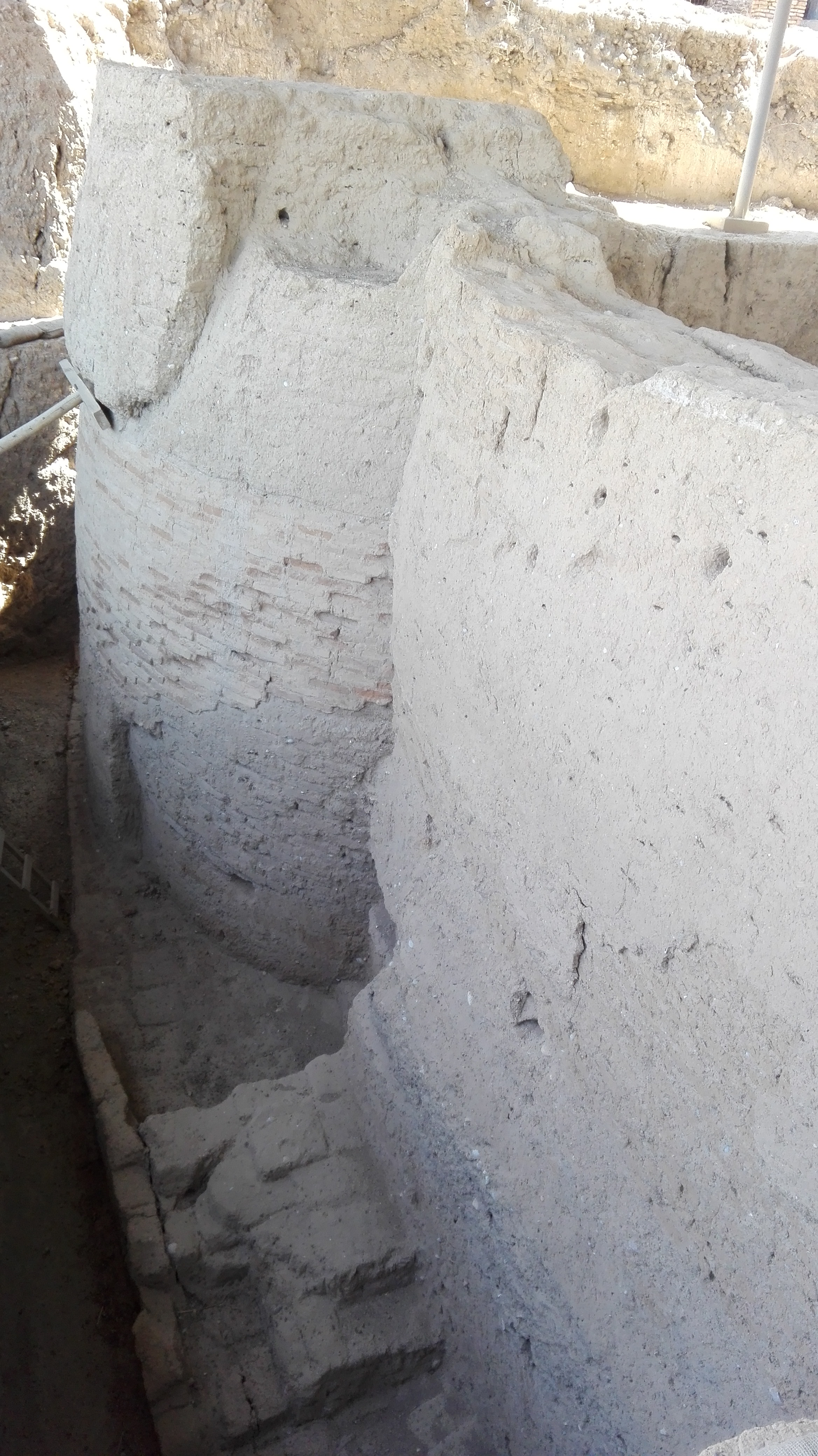
Archaeological Citadel of Erbil wall

==== China ====
Chinese defensive walls
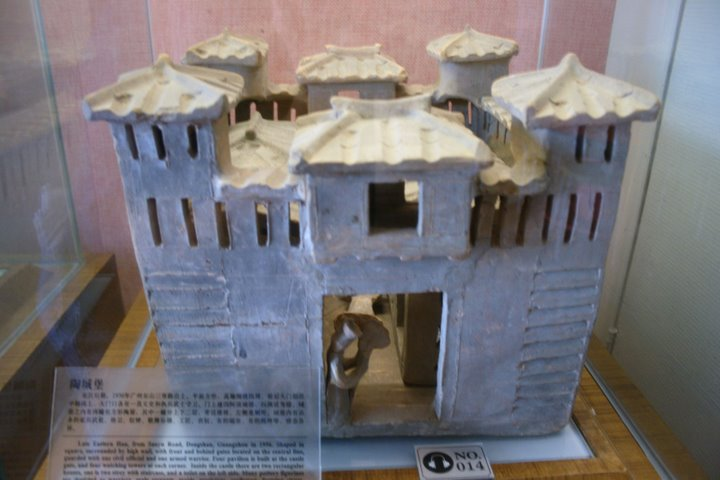
Late Han dynasty castle (wubi)

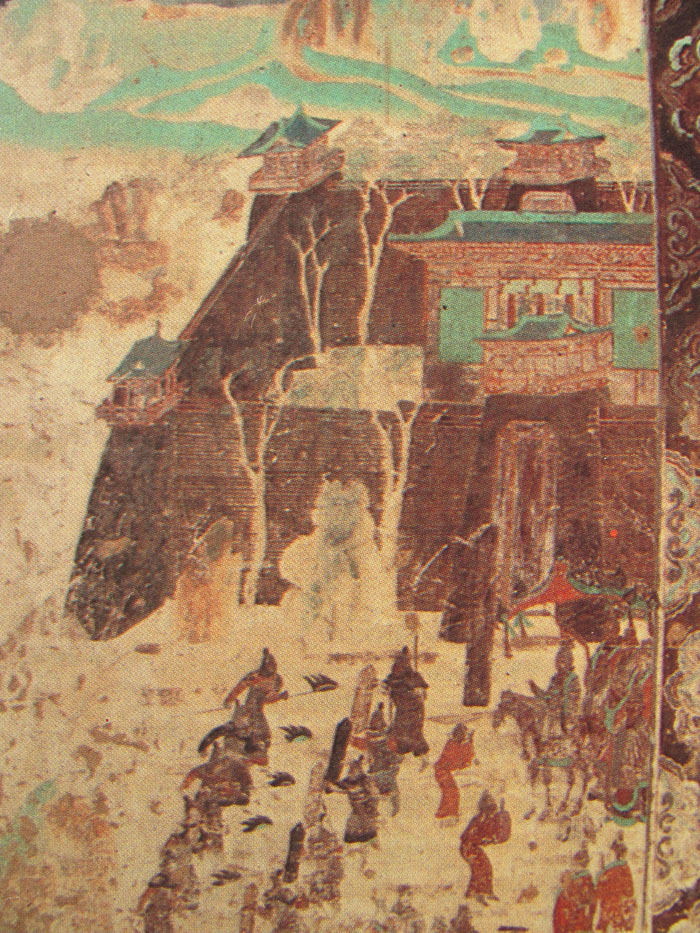
Fortress and soldiers training, Tang dynasty

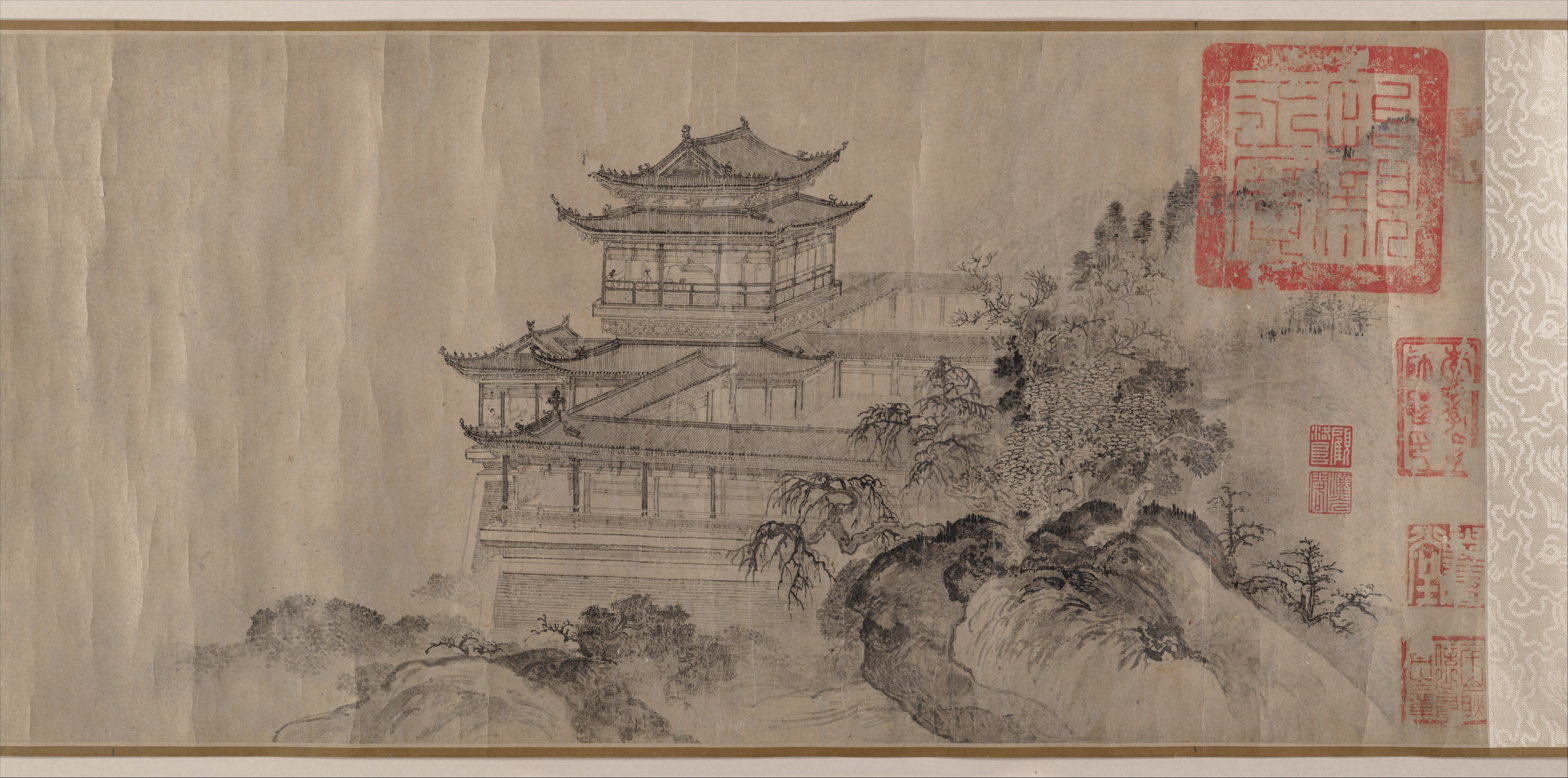
Prince of Teng Pavilion, Yuan dynasty

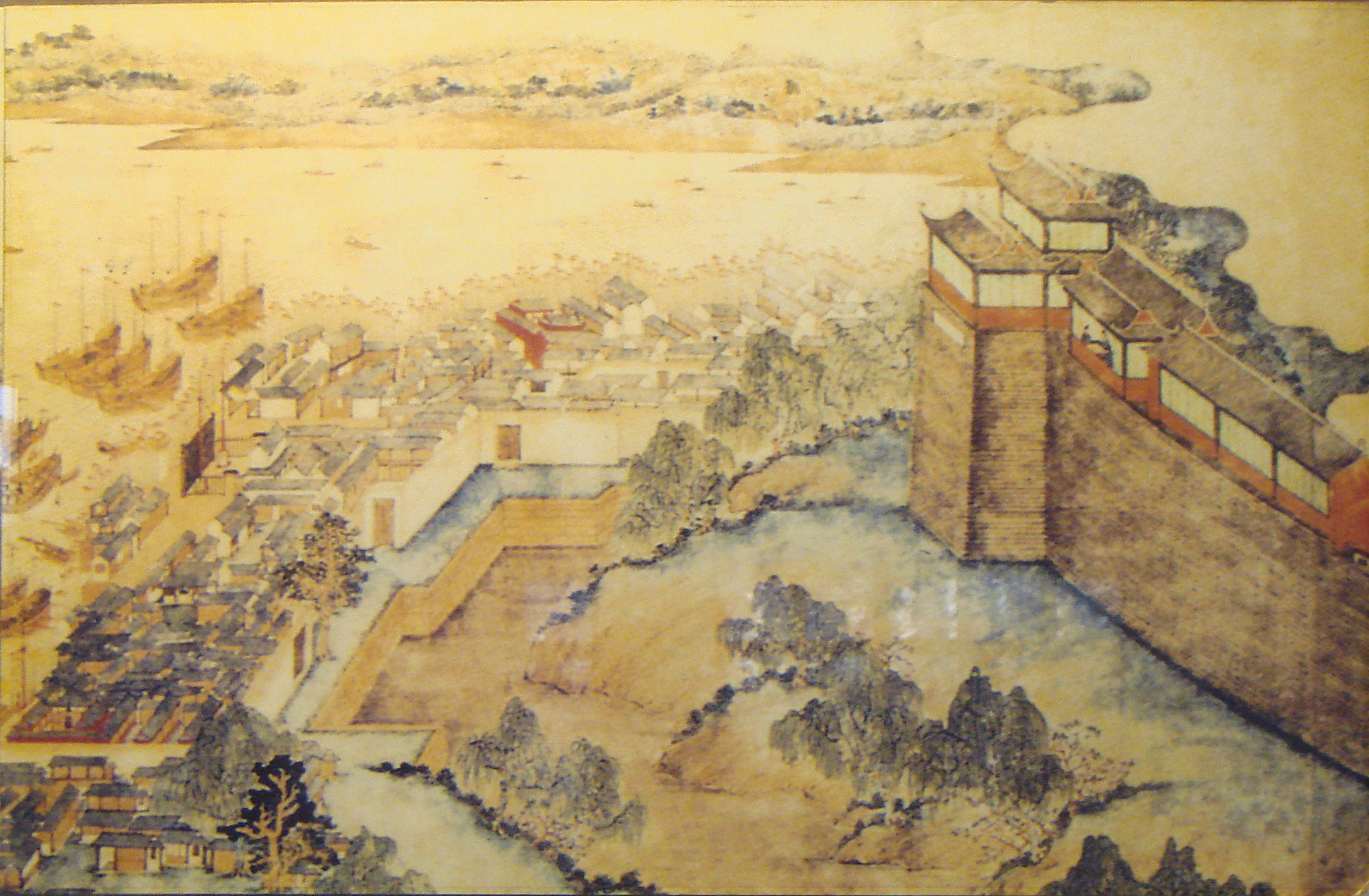
Old City of Shanghai with walls and seafront.

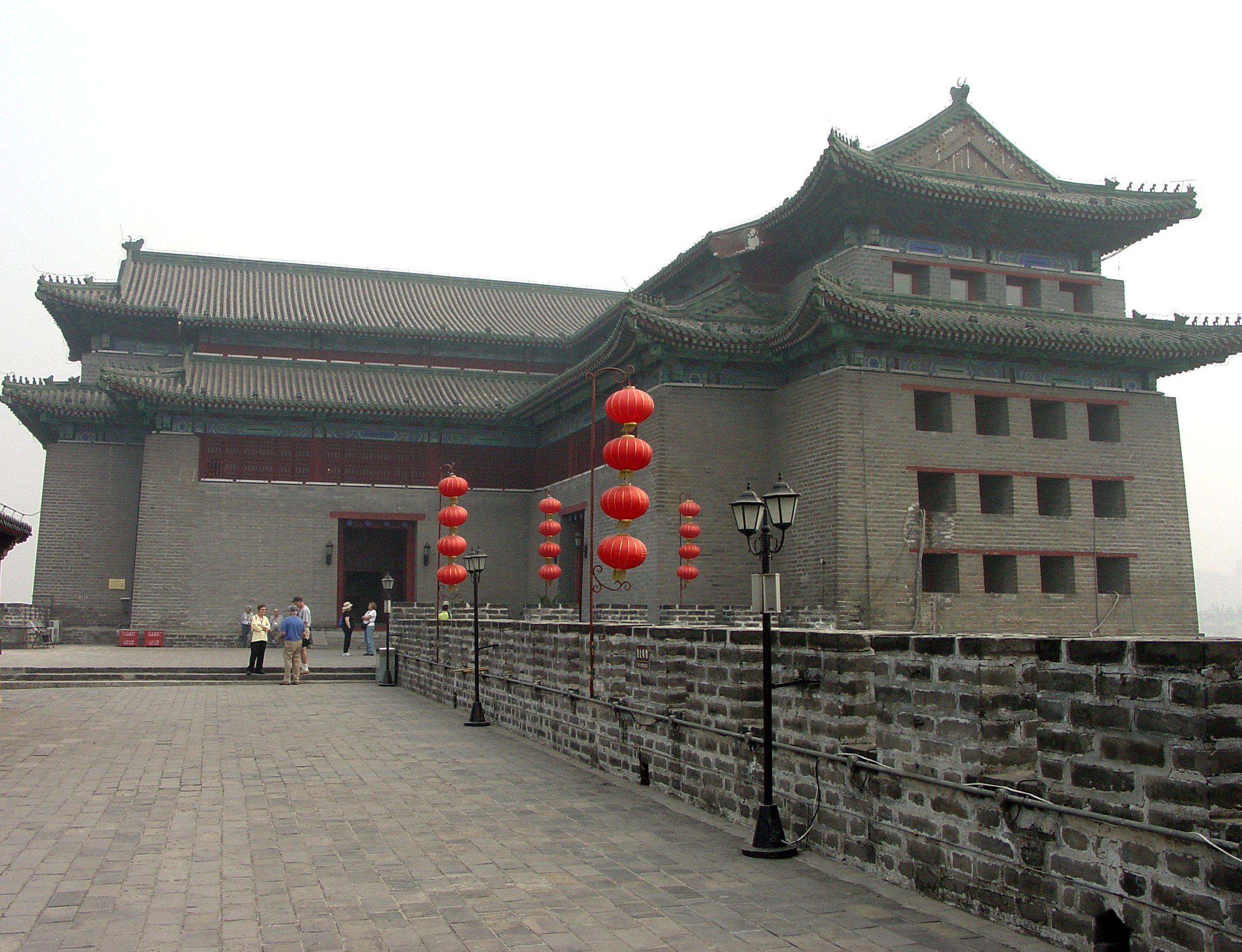
Top of the Beijing city wall

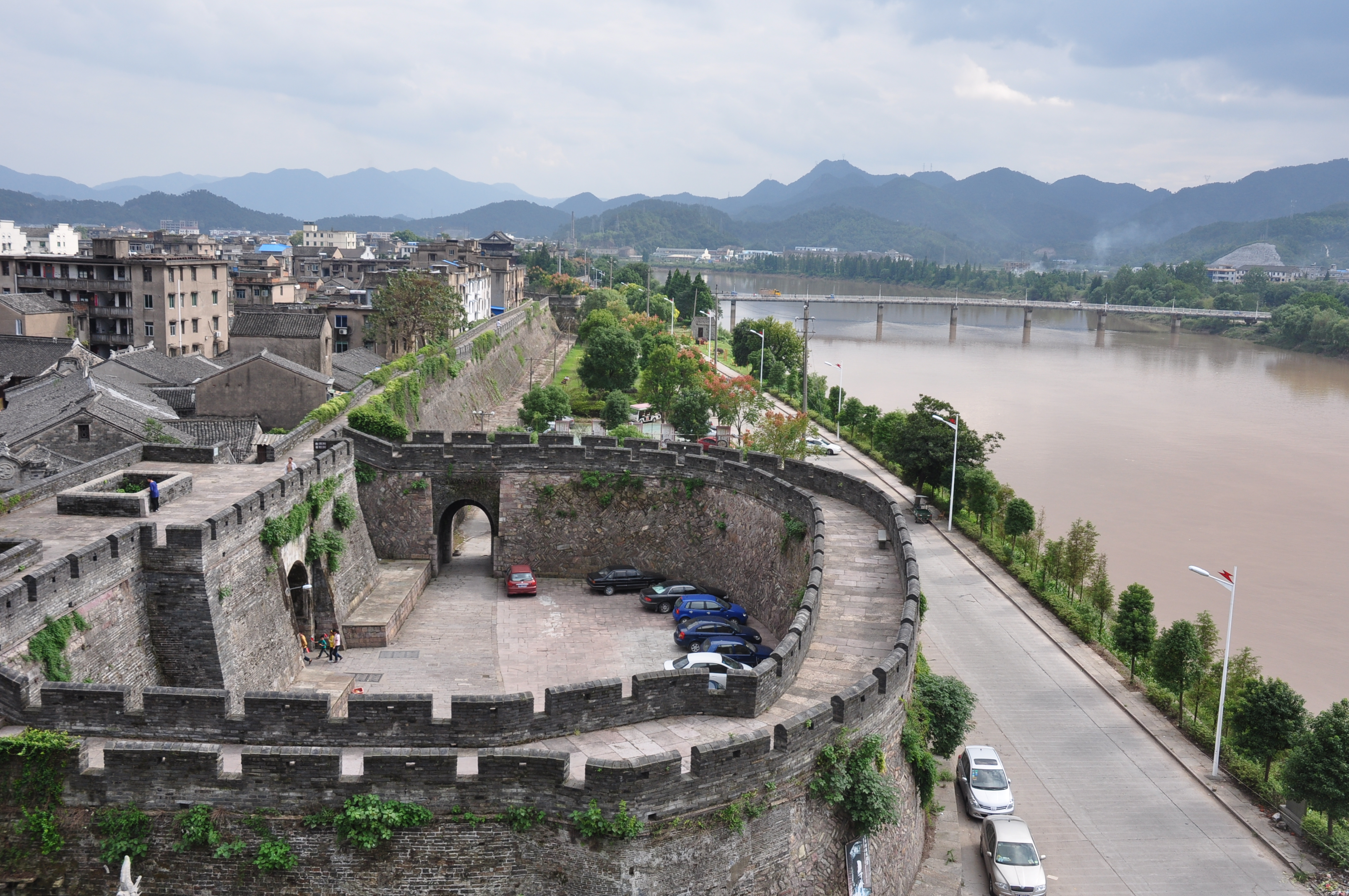
Barbican of Linhai city wall

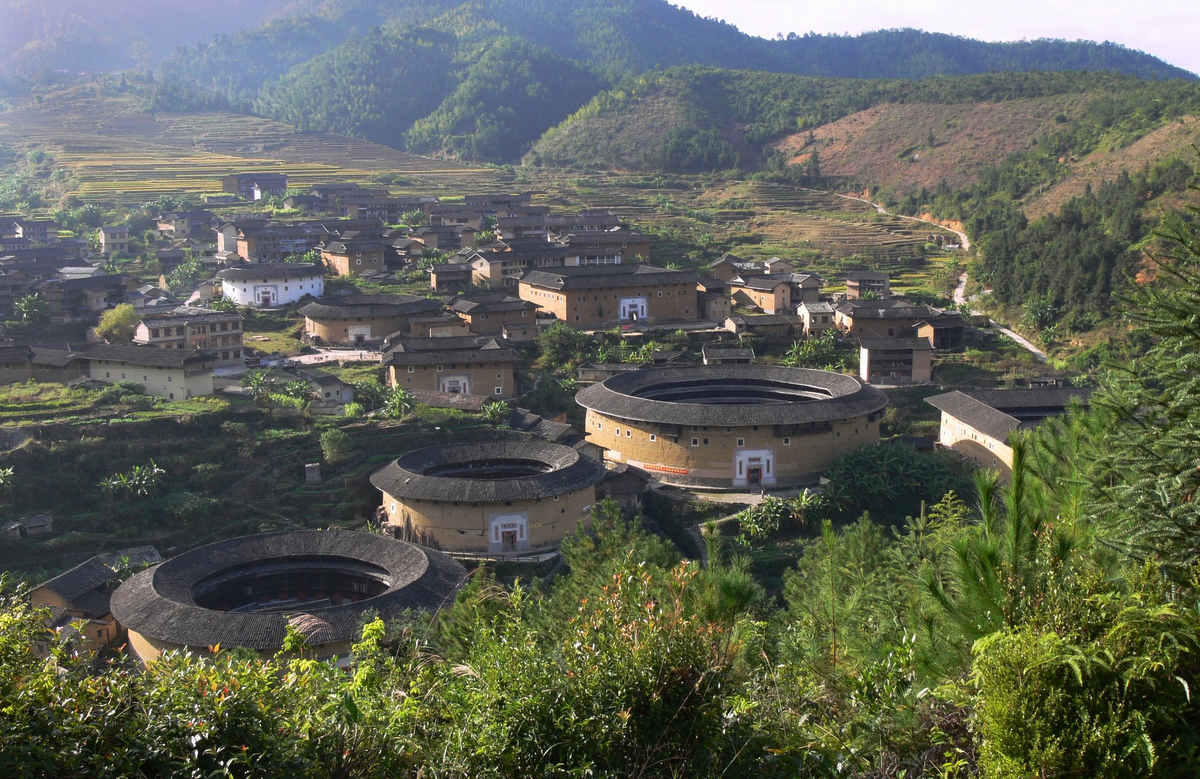
Walled tulou villages

=== Europe ===
European defensive walls
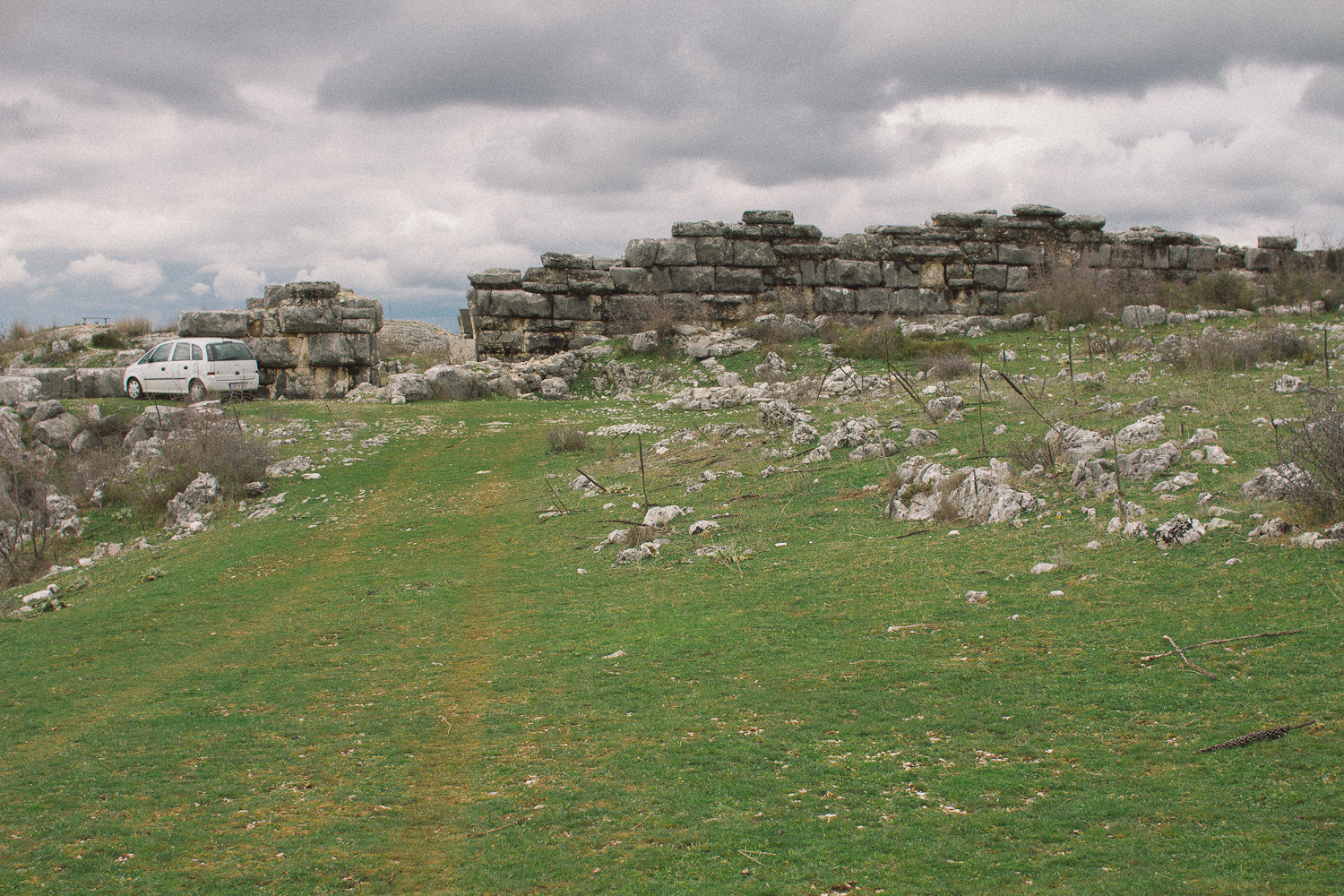
Daorson, Herzegovina, built around a prehistoric central fortified settlement or acropolis (existed there cca. 17–16th to the end of the Bronze Age, cca. 9-8th c. BCE), surrounded by cyclopean walls (similar to Mycenae) dated to the 4th c. BCE.

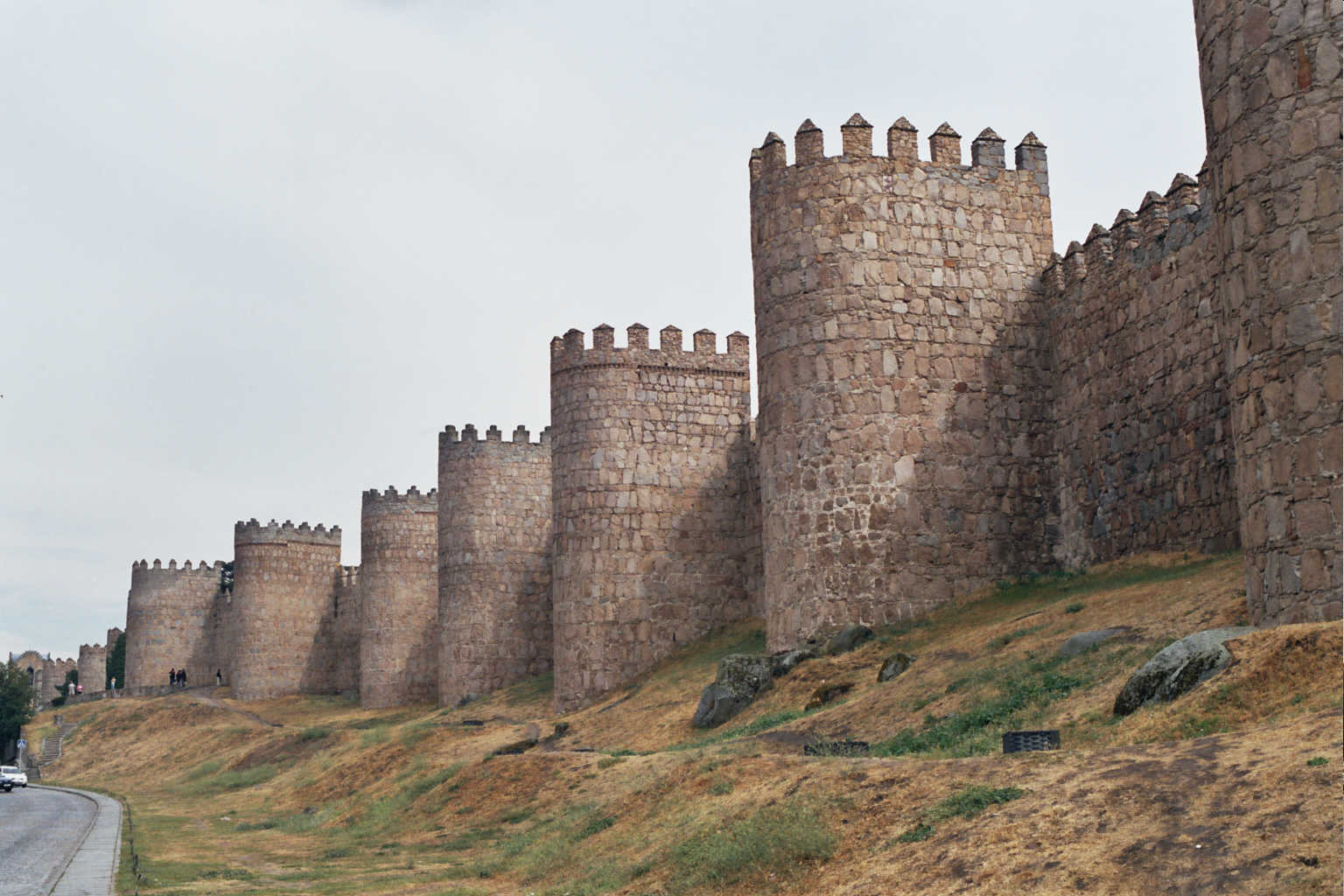
City walls in Ávila, Spain, a UNESCO World Heritage Site

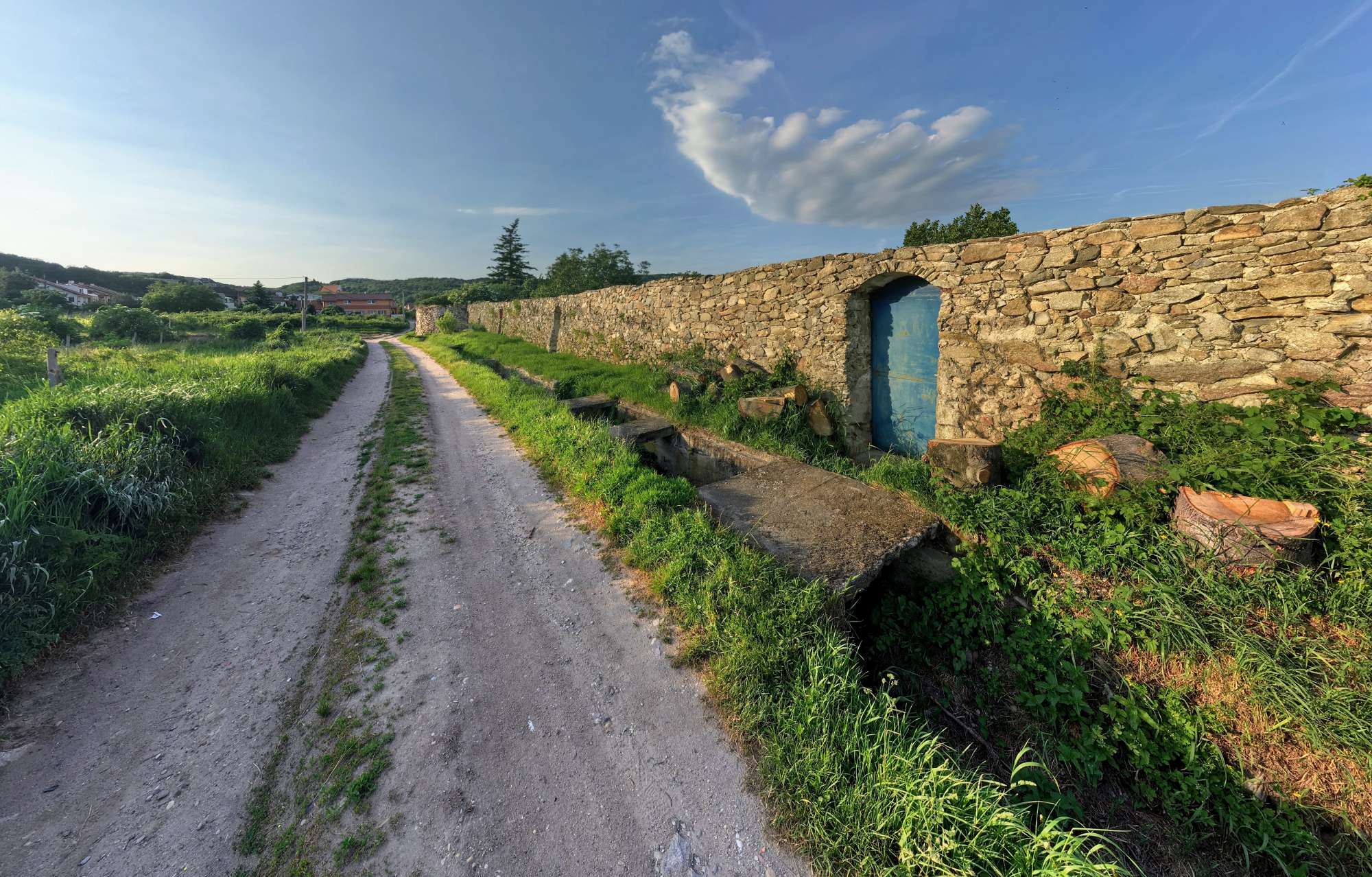
The remaining section of city walls in town of Svätý Jur, Slovakia

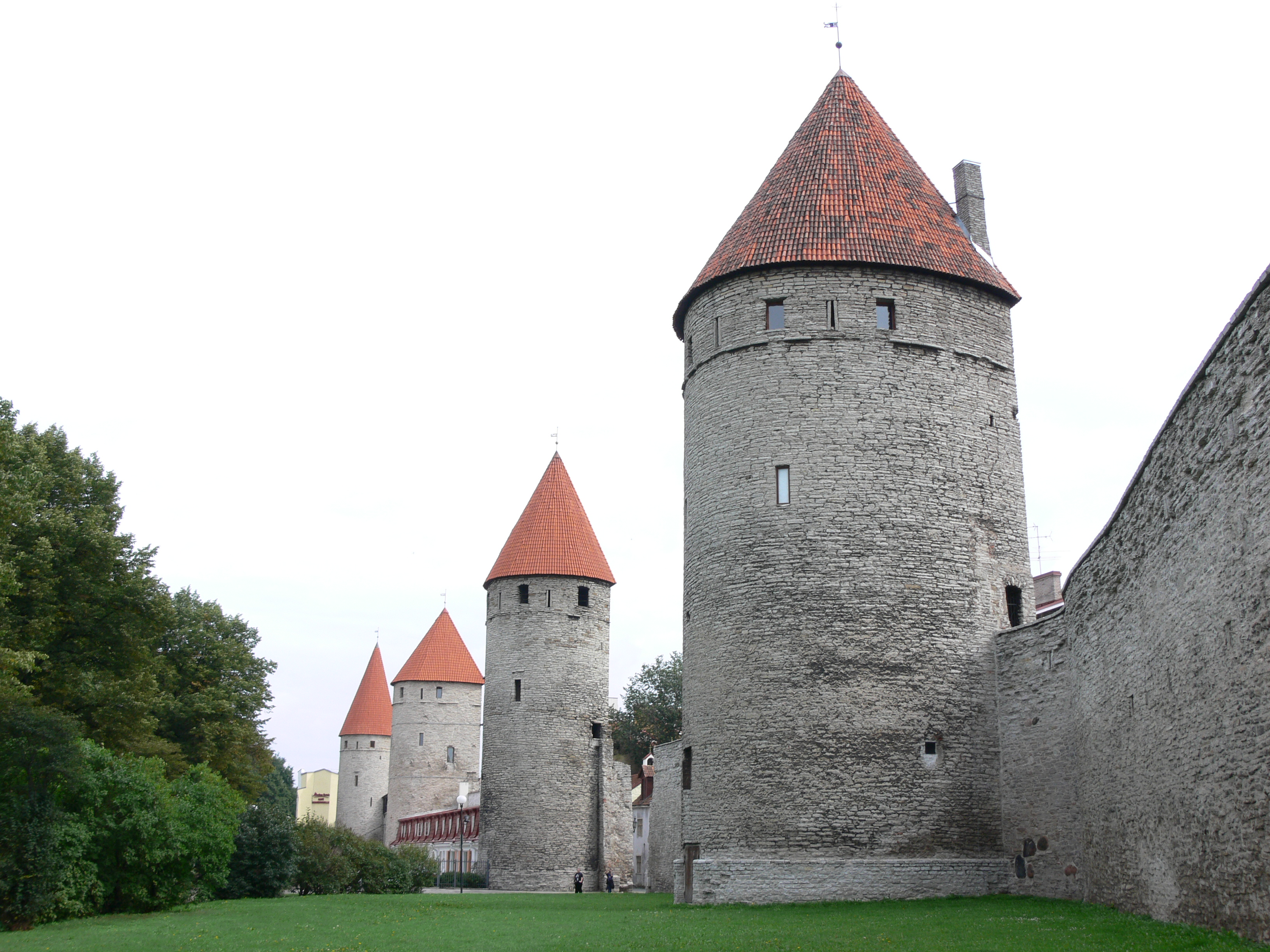
The walls of Tallinn, Estonia, a UNESCO World Heritage Site

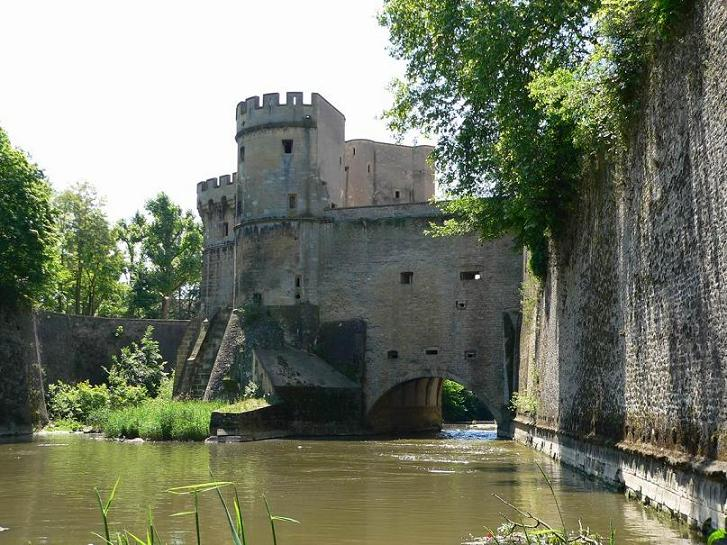
A city gate with its towers, the defensive walls, and the city ditch from the 13th century in Metz, France

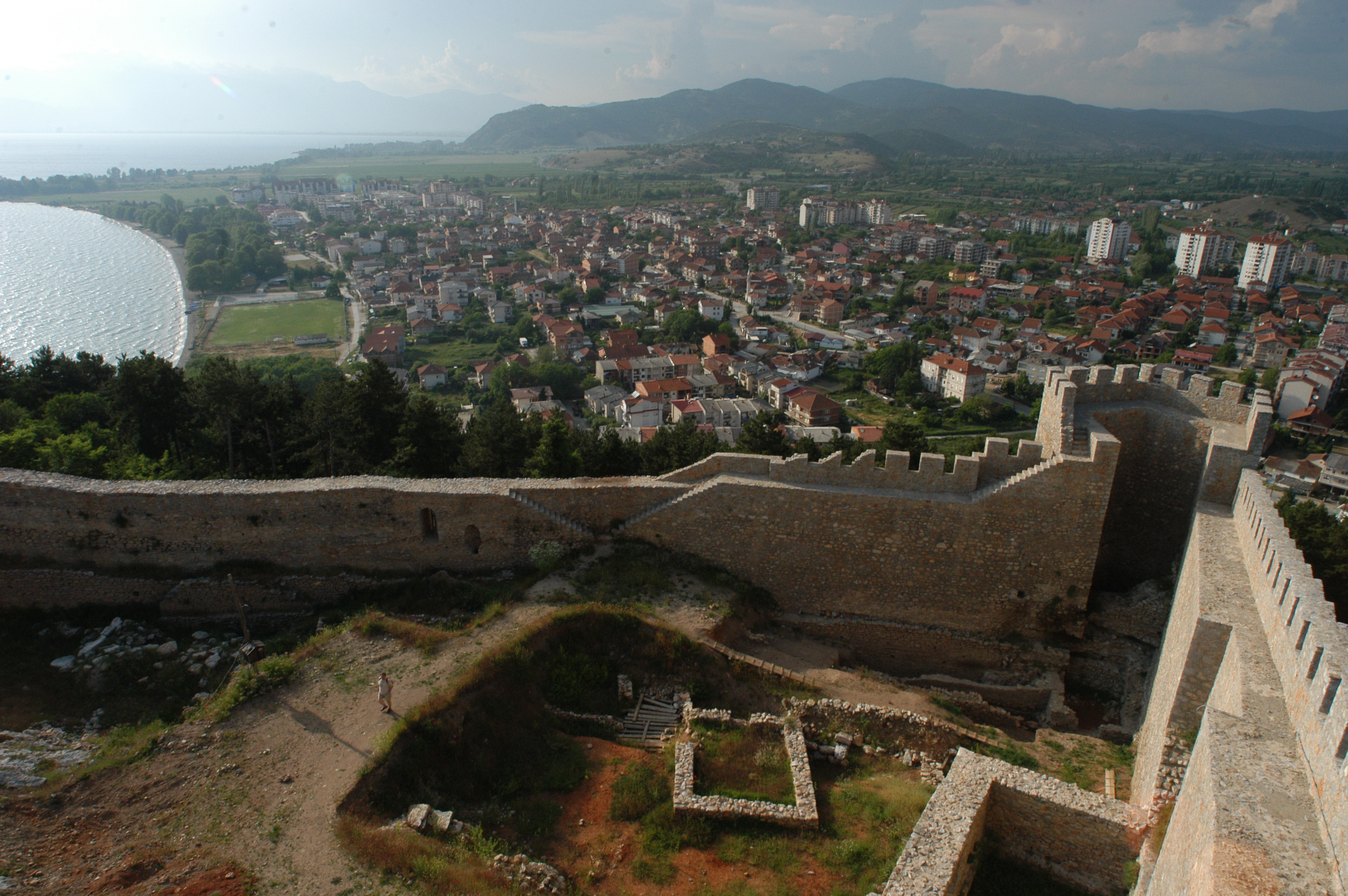
The medieval fortress overlooking the city of Ohrid in North Macedonia

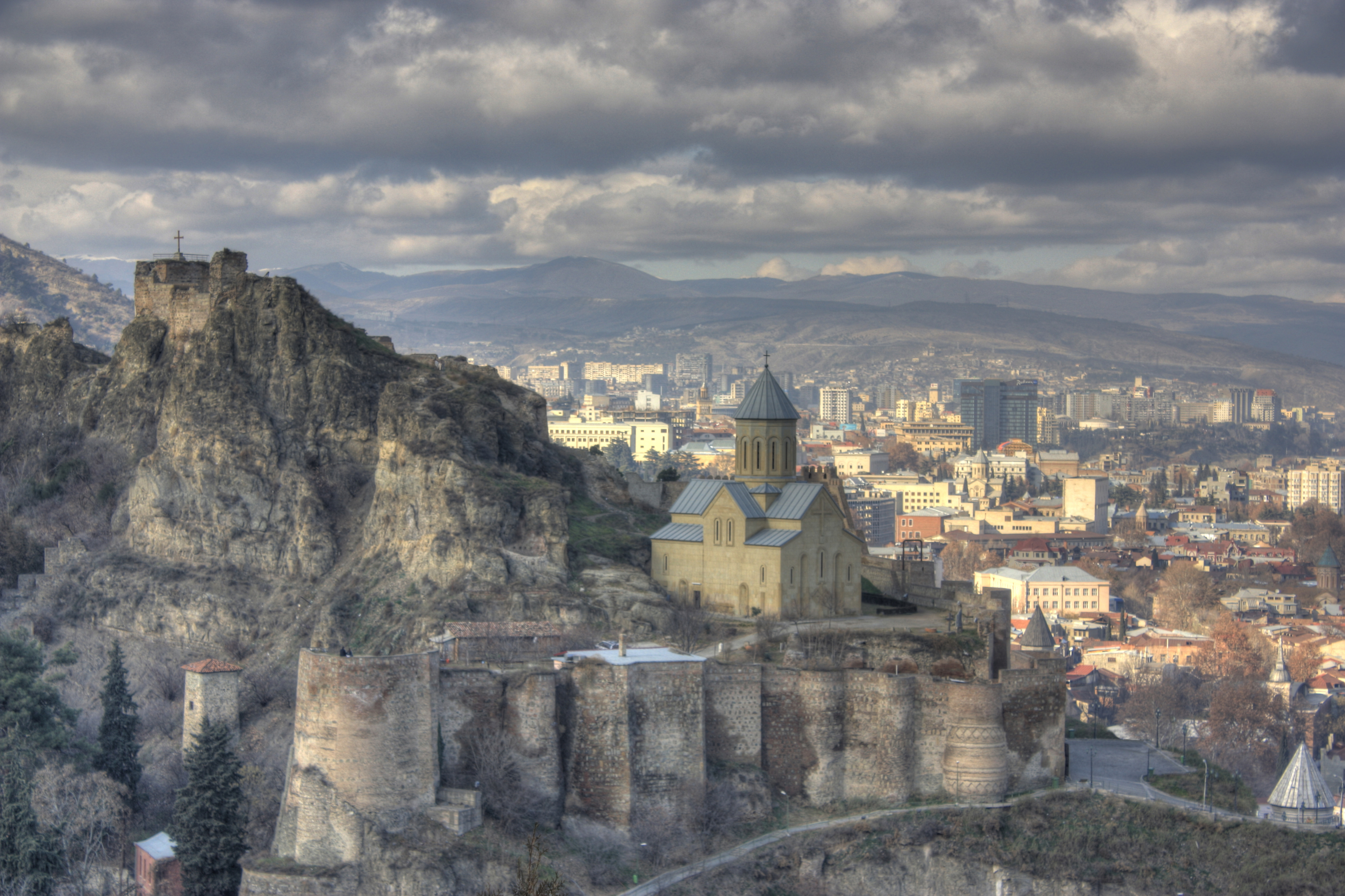
Narikala Fortress, Tbilisi, Georgia

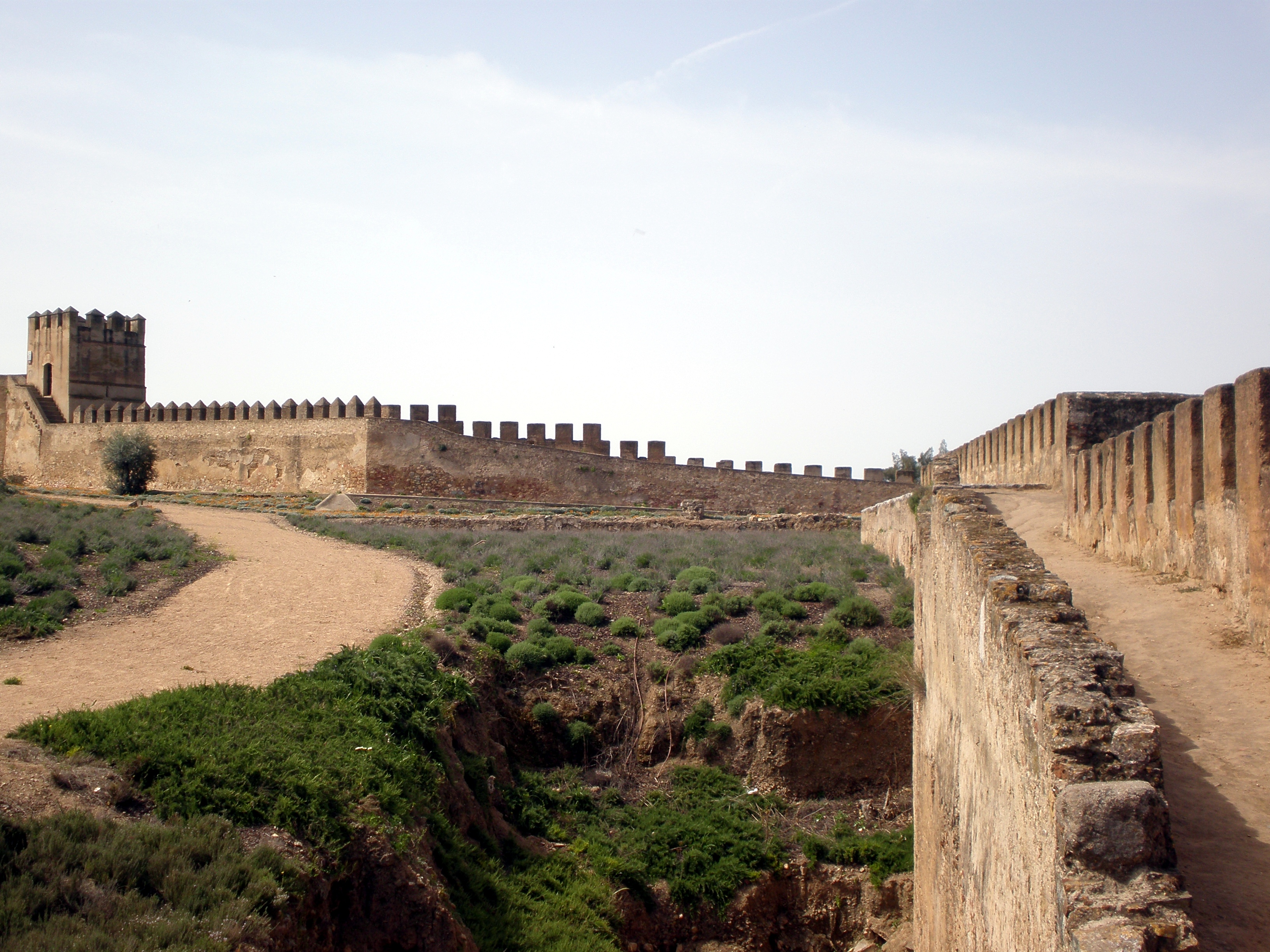
Badajoz (Spain).

==== Roman ====
Roman defensive walls
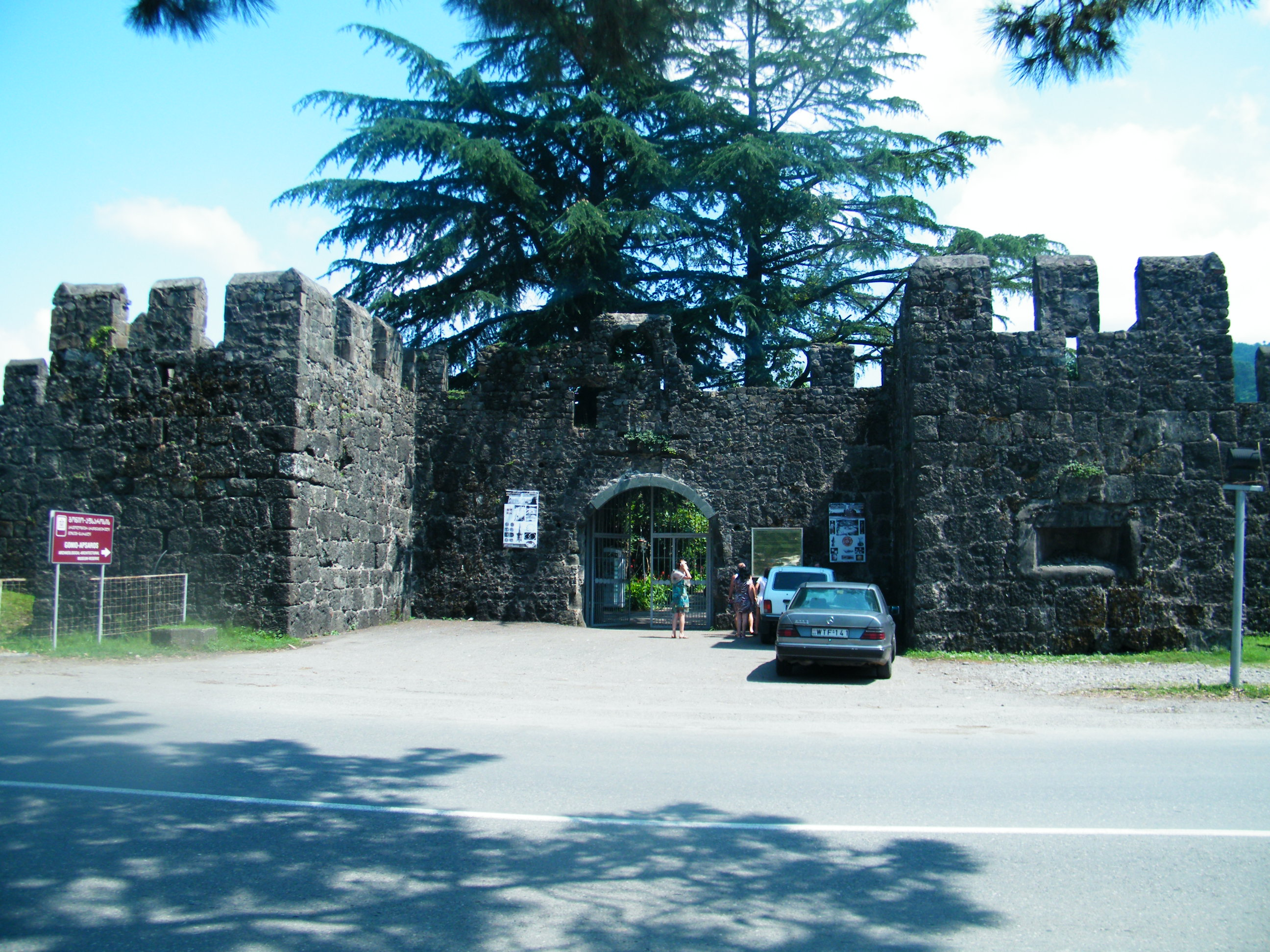
The gate of the Gonio castle

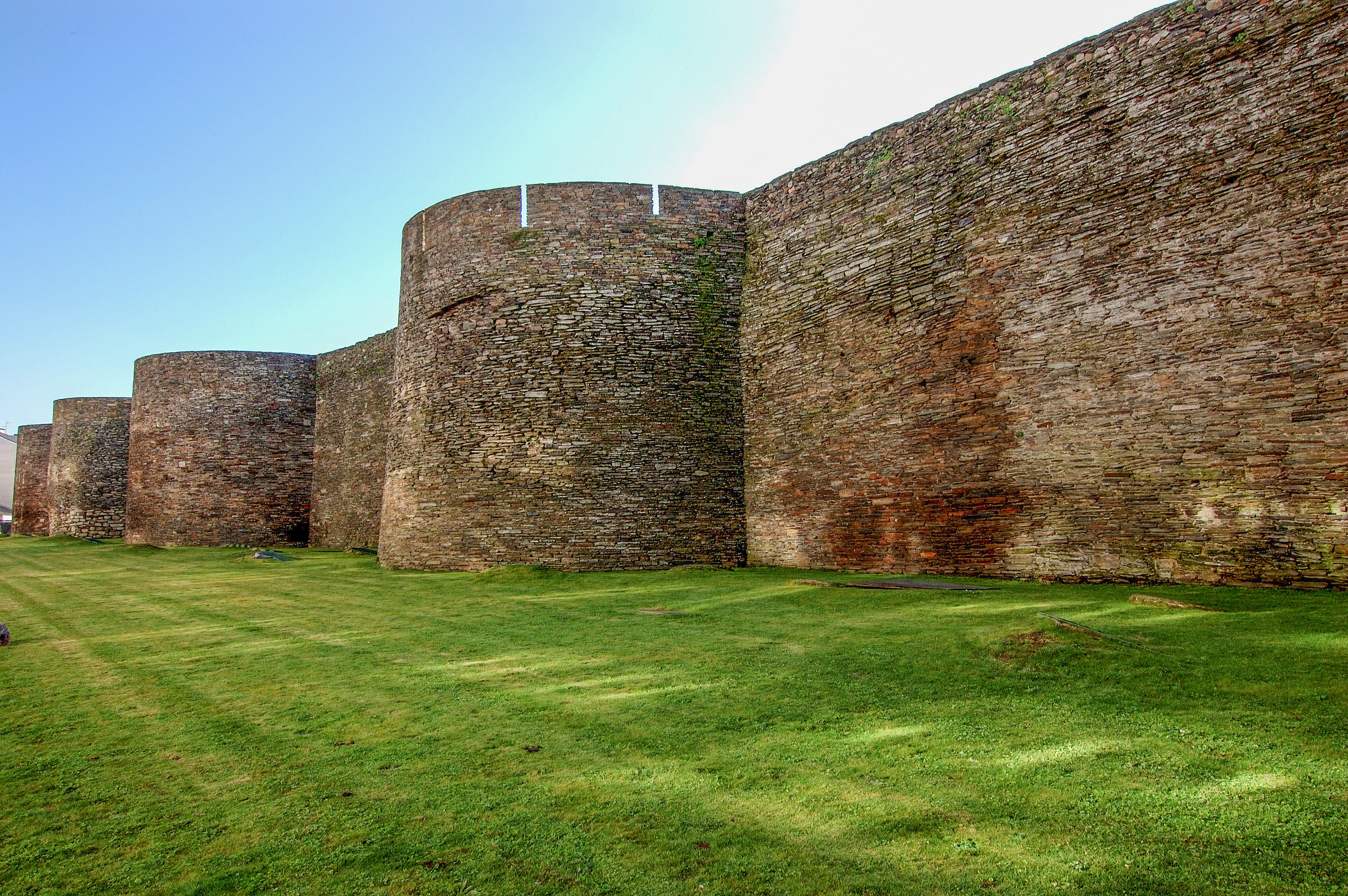
Lugo's Roman walls, Galicia, Spain, a UNESCO World Heritage Site

== See also ==
- List of cities with defensive walls
- List of town walls in England and Wales
- List of walls
- Ancient Roman defensive walls
- Barricade
- Border barrier
- Chinese city wall
- Citadel
- Glacis
- Medieval fortification
- Mural crown
- Murus Dacicus
- Murus Gallicus
- Talus (fortification)
- Châteauneuf Enclosure
