= Suzhou City Wall =

Historic wall around Suzhou, Jiangsu, China

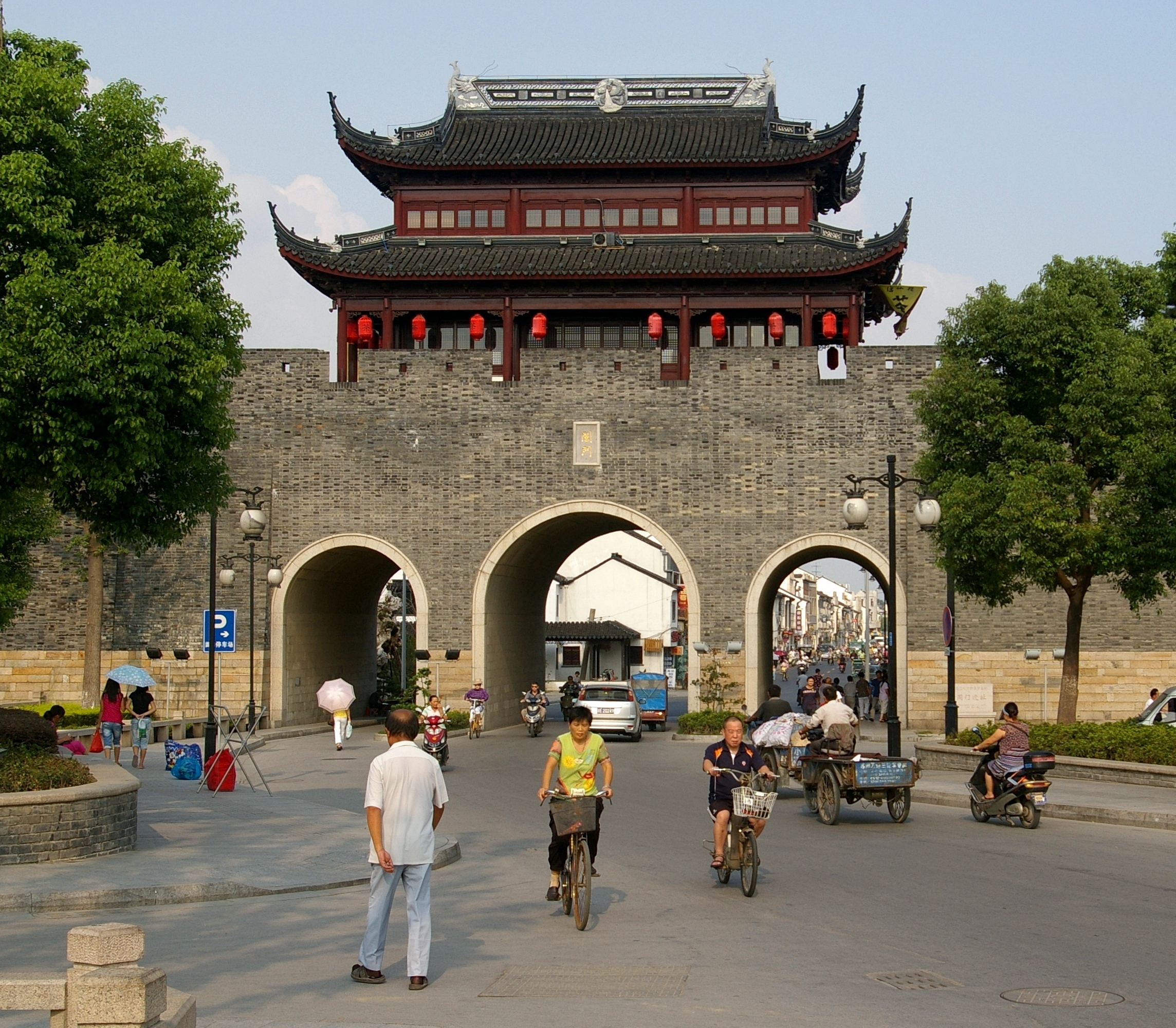
- Chang or Changmen Gate (閶門 or 阊门) in Suzhou
- Traditional Chinese: 蘇州城牆
- Simplified Chinese: 苏州城墙
- Literal meaning: Suzhou City Wall
Transcriptions
Standard Mandarin
- Hanyu Pinyin: Sūzhōu Chéngqiáng
- Wade–Giles: Su-chou Ch'eng-ch'iang

The Suzhou City Wall was the city wall that once surrounded Suzhou, a major city in southeastern Jiangsu Province in eastern China.

== History ==
The state of Wu is recorded fortifying its capital of Wu (modern Suzhou) in 514 BC. The original city wall had only one entrance, the Pan Gate. Most of the current fortifications date to around 1662, when they were rebuilt under the early Qing dynasty to repair damage from the conquest of the Ming. Most of the wall was demolished in 1958.

== Structure ==
Before its demolition, the city wall was 15,204 m (49,882 ft) long. Today, only 2,072 m (6,798 ft) remain.

== See also ==
- Pan Gate, the oldest surviving component of the wall
