= Chinese city wall =

Defensive walls built in pre-modern China

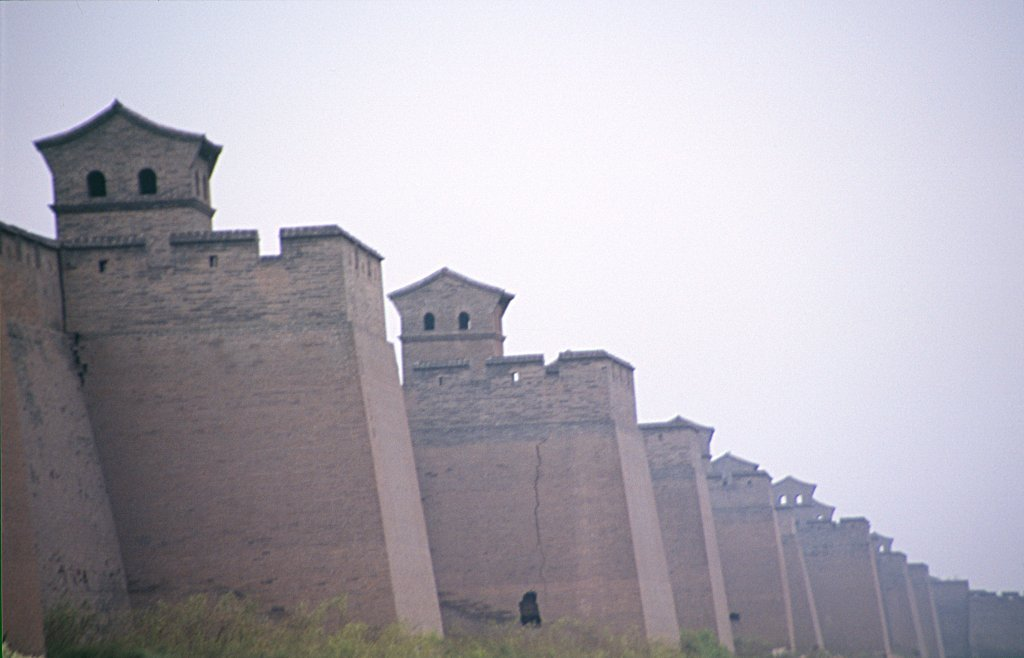
Ming dynasty wall of Pingyao

Chinese city walls (traditional Chinese: 城牆; simplified Chinese: 城墙; pinyin: chéngqiáng; lit. 'city wall') refer to defensive walls built to protect important towns and cities in pre-modern China. In addition to walls, Chinese city defenses also included fortified towers and gates, as well as moats and ramparts around the walls.

== Meaning of the word Chengqiang ==
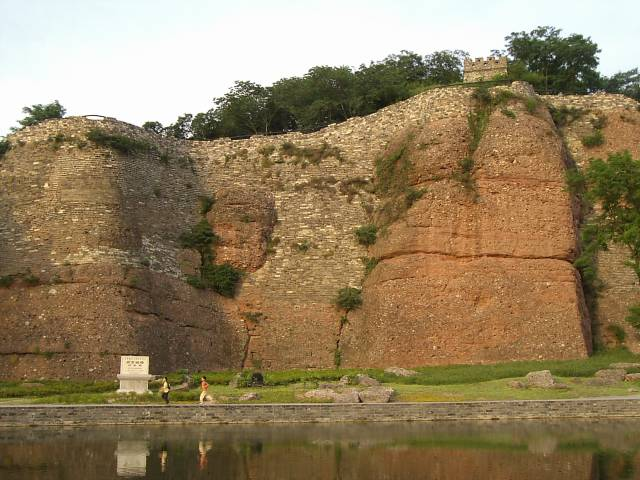
The Stone City is a wall in Nanjing dating to the ancient period. Almost all of the original city is gone, but portions of the city wall remain. Not to be confused with the City Wall of Nanjing.

The most specific Chinese word for a city wall is chéngqiáng (城墙), which can be used in two senses in the modern Chinese language. It broadly refers to all defensive walls, including the Great Wall of China, as well as similar defensive structures in areas outside of China such as Hadrian's Wall. More specifically Chengqiang refers to defensive walls built around a city or town. However, in classical Chinese, the character chéng (城) denoted the defensive wall of the "inner city" which housed government buildings. The character guō (郭) denoted the defensive wall of the "outer city", housing mainly residences. The phrase chángchéng (長城), literally "the long wall", refers to the Great Wall.

Colloquially chéng referred to both the walls and city so that both were synonymous with each other. A city was not a city without walls, however large it may be.

There is no real city in Northern China without a surrounding wall, a condition which, indeed, is expressed by the fact that the Chinese use the same word Ch'eng for a city and a city wall: for there is no such thing as a city without a wall. It is just as inconceivable as a house without a roof. It matters little how large, important, and well ordered a settlement may be; if not properly defined and enclosed by walls, it is not a city in the traditional Chinese sense. Thus, for instance, Shanghai (outside the "native town"), the most important commercial centre of modern China, is, to the old-fashioned Chinaman, not a real city, only a settlement or a huge trading centre, grown out of a fishing village. And the same is true of several other comparatively modern commercial centres without encircling walls; they are not ch'engs, or cities, according to traditional Chinese conception, whatever modern republican officials may choose to call them.

— Osvald Síren

== History ==
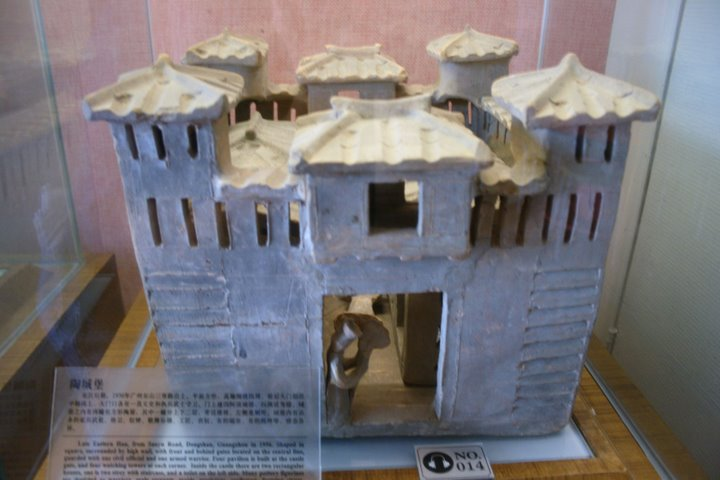
Late Eastern Han wubi pottery - front

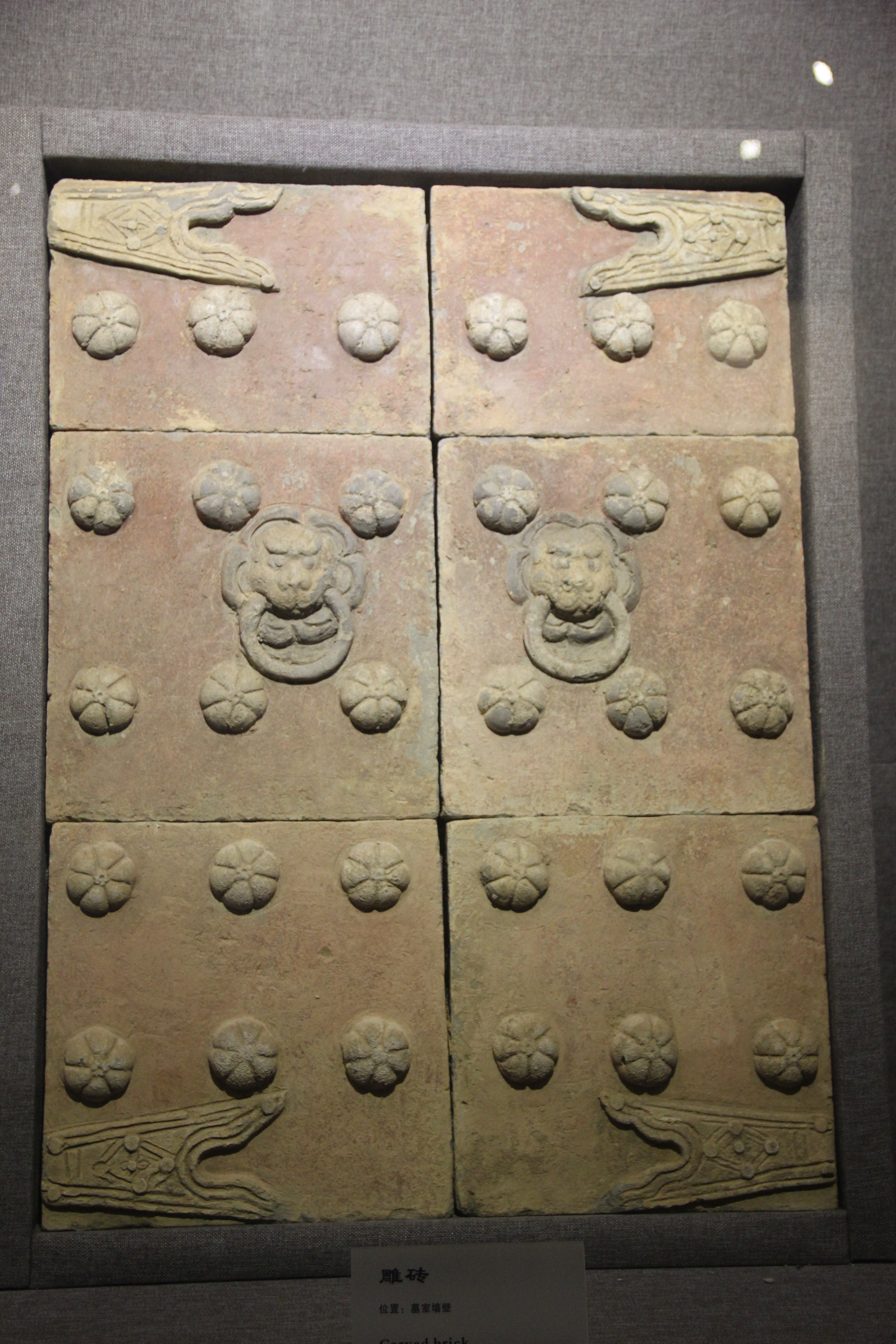
Tomb bricks in the shape of a Chinese gate from Luoyang

=== Pre-imperial ===
The invention of the city wall is attributed to the semi-historical sage Gun (鯀) of the Xia dynasty, father of Yu the Great. The traditional narrative tells that Gun built the inner wall to defend the prince and the outer wall to settle the people. An alternative narrative attributes the first city wall to the Yellow Emperor.

A number of Neolithic walls surrounding substantial settlements have been excavated in recent years. These include a wall at a Liangzhu culture site, a stone wall at Sanxingdui, and several tamped earthen walls at the Longshan culture site.

In 15th century BC the Shang dynasty constructed large walls around the site of Ao with dimensions of 20 metres (66 ft) in width at the base and enclosed an area of some 2,100 yards (1,900 m) squared. Walls of similar dimensions were also found at the ancient capital of the state of Zhao, Handan (founded in 386 BC), also with a width of 20 metres (66 ft) at the base, a height of 15 metres (49 ft), and a length of 1,530 yards (1,400 m) along its two rectangular sides.

Most settlements of significant size possessed a city wall from the Zhou dynasty onwards. The city wall of Pingyao was first constructed between 827 BC and 782 BC during the reign of King Xuan of Zhou. The city walls of Suzhou followed afterward under largely the same plan created by Wu Zixu in the 5th century BC. and lasted until their demolition in the 1960s and 1970s. Sieges of city walls (along with naval battles) were portrayed on bronze 'hu' vessels dated to the Warring States (5th century BC to 3rd century BC), like those found in Chengdu, Sichuan, China in 1965.

An example of walls built the Spring and Autumn to Warring States can include the Great Wall of Qi, which was built with a variety of different materials and construction techniques - such as one section being made of stones and another section being made of rammed earth.

=== Han dynasty ===
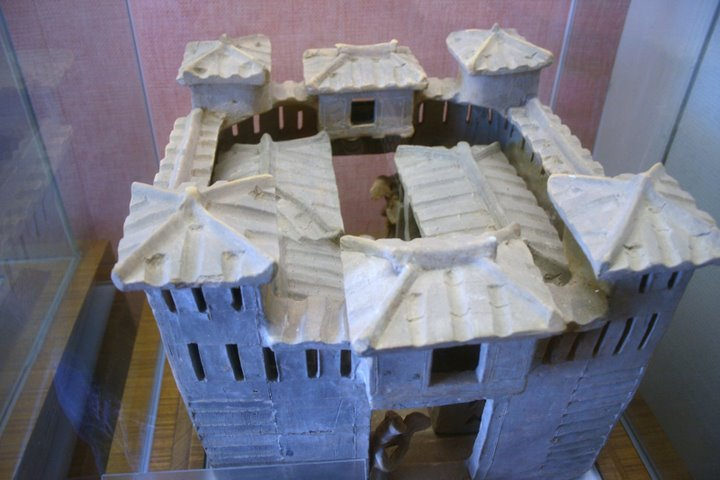
Late Eastern Han wubi pottery - top

The walls of Han dynasty Chang'an were completed in 189 BC and covered a perimeter of 25.5 km while the later Eastern Han capital of Luoyang measured 4.3 km by 3.7 km.

==== Wu bi ====
By the end of the Eastern Han dynasty local gentry, clansmen, and villagers built more confined defensive structures in the form of square forts known as wū bì (塢壁). These were erected in remote countrysides and had particularly high walls, cornered watchtowers, and gates to the front and back. According to Stephen Turnbull, the wū bì are the closest approximation to the concept of a European castle that has ever existed in Chinese history.

According to Jan van Linschoten, writing in 1596, the Chinese evidently did not have castles or fortresses, but only city walls for defense:

All the Townes in that Countrie are walled about with stone Walles, and have Ditches of water round about them for their Securitie; they use no Fortresse nor Castles, but onely upon every Gate of the Towne they have strong Towers, wherein they place their Ordnance for the defence of ye Towne. They use all kinde of armes, as Calivers, etc.

=== Sui dynasty ===
Under the Sui dynasty, the capital of Chang'an was renamed Da Xingcheng and its outer wall was expanded to cover a perimeter of 35 km.

=== Tang dynasty ===
Under the Tang dynasty, the capital of Chang'an's outer walls measured 9.72 km east to west by 8.65 km north to south.

=== Jin dynasty ===
Under the Jin dynasty the capital of Zhongdu had walls covering a perimeter of 24 km and reached a height of 12m.

== Composition ==
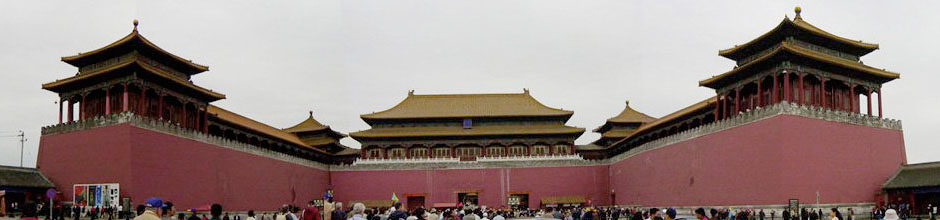
Meridian Gate, the front entrance to the Forbidden City, with two protruding wings.

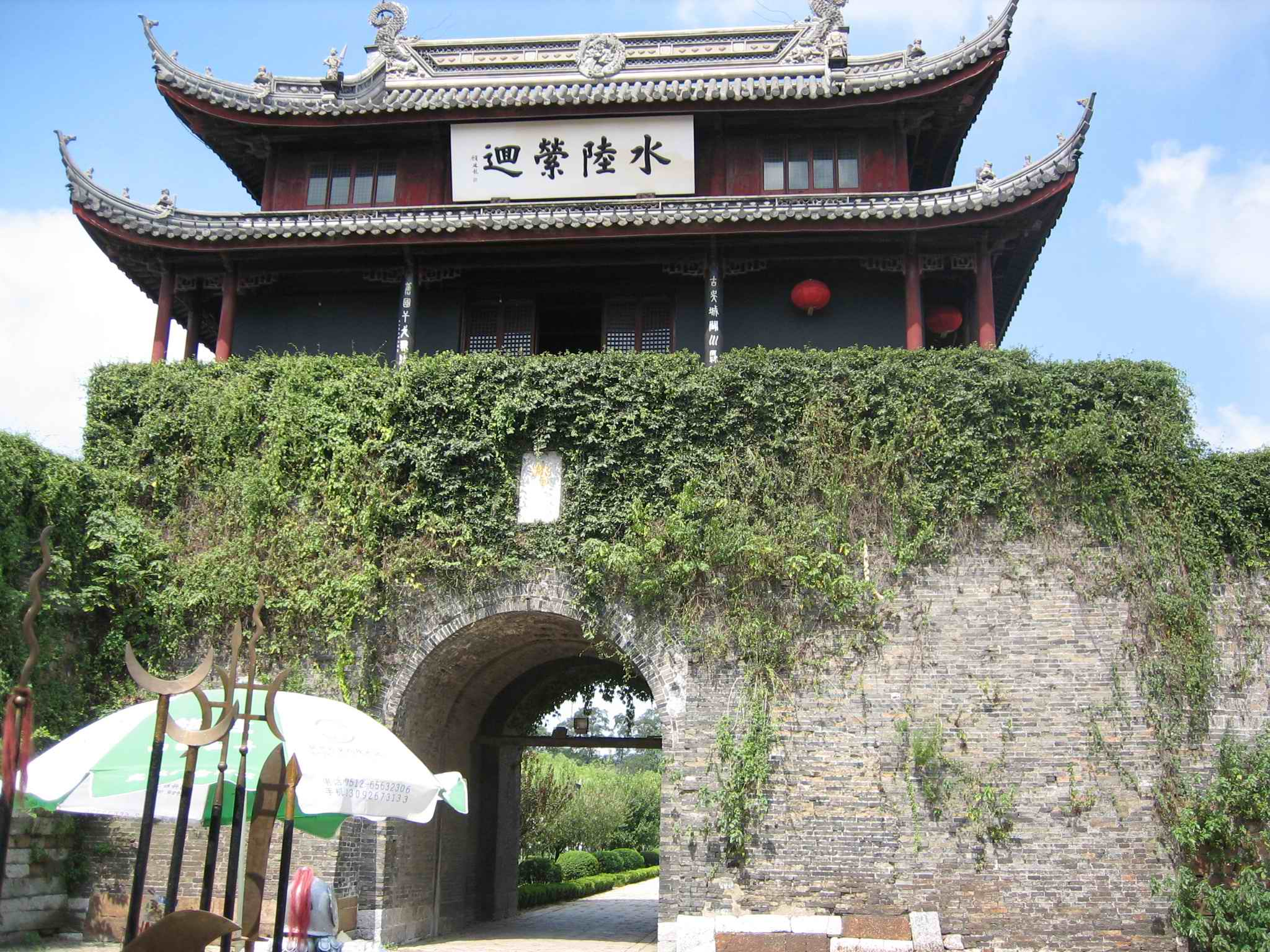
Panmen Gate in Suzhou, a combined land-and-water gate

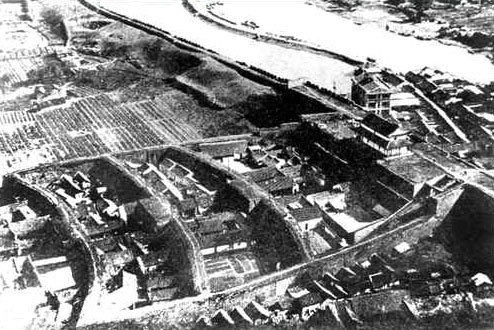
Multiple barbicans of Tongji Gate, Nanjing

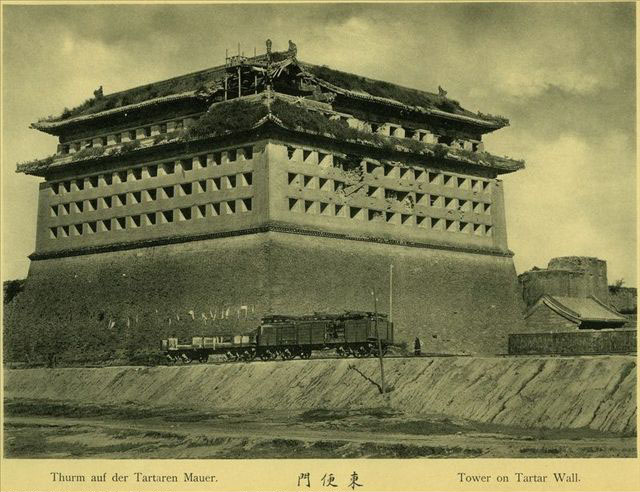
Eastern guard tower in Beijing.

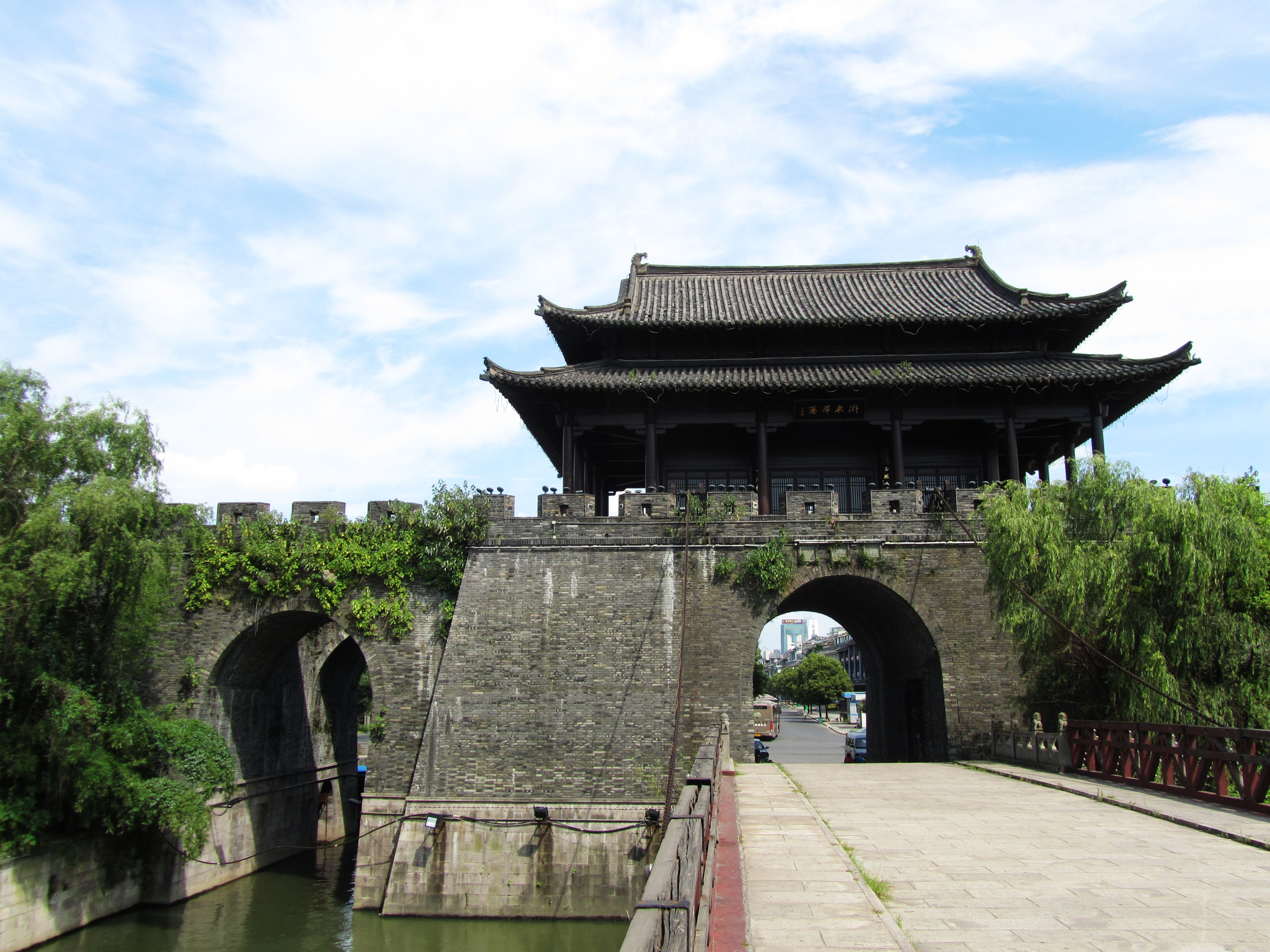
Ying'en Gate of Shaoxing, showing both entrances of a combined land-and-water gate

=== Material ===
The oldest form of wall construction in China was of rammed earth. Stone rubble was used for the foundation. Bricks were also used but were less common. From the Zhou dynasty, bricks were made of adobe, until the Han dynasty, when baked bricks became common. It is not certain how common brick faced walls were during the Shang and Zhou dynasties. In the state of Xia (Sixteen Kingdoms), the Xiongnu engineer Chigan Ali had the workers bake bricks for wall construction, and if a hammer blow could make a depression in them an inch deep, he would have the responsible worker killed. He also had the earth used to make the wall boiled with rice to harden it. While Chinese city walls always had an earthen core, the outer facings could be of either baked bricks laid in lime mortar, or stone where it was commonly available, such as in Sichuan. Bricks were also used for constructing the sewer network below the Beijing city wall in the 16th century. In addition to tamped earth, Chinese walls were sometimes reinforced with wood. A study of Han forts in Xinjiang found that they had brushwood and poplar interspersed between the layers of tamped earth.

=== Dimensions ===
Remains of city walls have been found as early as 15th century BC during the Shang dynasty, which constructed large walls around the site of Ao with dimensions of 20 metres (66 ft) in width at the base and enclosed an area of some 2,100 yards (1,900 m) squared. Walls of similar dimensions are also found at the ancient capital of the state of Zhao, Handan (founded in 386 BC), with a width of 20 metres (66 ft) at the base, a height of 15 metres (49 ft), and a length of 1,530 yards (1,400 m) along its two rectangular sides. At the Former Han capital of Chang'an, the city wall constructed around 200 BC by Yang Yangcheng was 15m tall and 12m wide. It was also protected by a moat 45m wide with a depth of 4.5m. During the Yuan dynasty, Suzhou's walls were over 7m tall and, 11m thick at the base, and 5m thick at the top. During the Ming dynasty, prefectural and provincial capital walls were 10 to 20 metres (33 to 66 ft) thick at the base and 5 to 10 metres (16 to 33 ft) at the top. Most Chinese walls were sloped rather than vertical. Sometimes the walls were raised on a plinth or supporting platform. Aside from the wall itself were attached watch towers and gate towers, usually two or three stories tall.

Wall bricks came in many dimensions depending on regional variations. In the north, 30 cm x 23 cm x 15 cm was the most common, and in the south, 15 cm x 13 cm x 3 cm.

Most imperial capitals and many important cities in the north had the walls of rectangular shape. In areas of rugged relief, however, a square form was usually replaced by one of irregular shape, determined in many cases by topographic conditions. The size of the walled area and the elaboration of wall construction were normally directly proportional to the rank of the city in the administrative hierarchy. The size of the enclosed area of the typical walled city decreases southward, indicative of the magnitude of regional urbanization in Ming times or earlier. At later dates, an outer wall was often erected to enclose settlement that had spread outside the city, and in many cases "multiple cities" were developed at the same locality.

— Sen-Dou Chang

Long-term strategic considerations meant that the walls of important cities often enclosed an area much larger than existing urban areas in order to ensure excess capacity for growth, and to secure resources such as timber and farmland in times of war. The city wall of Quanzhou in Fujian still contained one quarter vacant land by 1945. The city wall of Suzhou by the Republic of China era still enclosed large tracts of farmland. The City Wall of Nanjing, built during the Ming dynasty, enclosed an area large enough to house an airport, bamboo forests, and lakes in modern times.

=== Gates ===
Gates were placed symmetrically along the walls. The principal gate was traditionally located at the centre of the south wall. Gatehouses were generally built of wood and brick, which sat atop a raised and expanded section of the wall, surrounded by crenellated battlements. A tunnel ran under the gatehouse, with several metal gates and wooden doors. Camouflaged defensive positions are placed along the tunnel (in an effect similar to murder holes). Gatehouses were accessed by ramps, called horse ramps or bridle paths, (Chinese: 马道; pinyin: mǎdào), which sat against the wall adjacent to the gate.

=== Barbican ===
An "archery tower" was often placed in front of the main gatehouse, forming a barbican (Chinese: 瓮城; pinyin: wèngchéng). In its final form during the Ming and Qing dynasties, the archery tower was an elaborate construction, of comparable height to the main gatehouse, which stands some distance in front of the main gatehouse. At its base was a gate. The archery tower is so-named because of its rows of archery (and later cannon) placements, from which defenders could fire projectiles on attackers. Auxiliary walls, running perpendicularly to the main wall, connect the archery tower with the main gatehouse, enclosing a rectangular area. This area serves as a buffer zone, should the first gate be breached. Its Chinese name, "jar walls", refers to the intended strategy whereby attackers coming through the archery tower would be trapped in the barbican, open to attack from all sides.

In large gates there may be multiple barbicans – the main gate of Nanjing (Gate of China, Nanjing) had three barbicans, forming the most elaborate system still in existence in China.

=== Towers ===
Towers that protruded from the wall were located at regular intervals along the wall. Large and elaborate towers, called corner towers (角楼, Jiǎolóu), were placed where two walls joined (i.e. at corners). These were significantly higher than the wall itself, and gave defenders a bird's eye view over both the city and its surroundings.

=== Moat ===
In larger cities, a moat surrounded the wall. This could be connected to canals or rivers both in the city and outside, thus providing both a defense and a convenient transportation route. Nearby waterways might be adopted or altered to connect to, or form part of, the moat.

== Effectiveness against artillery ==
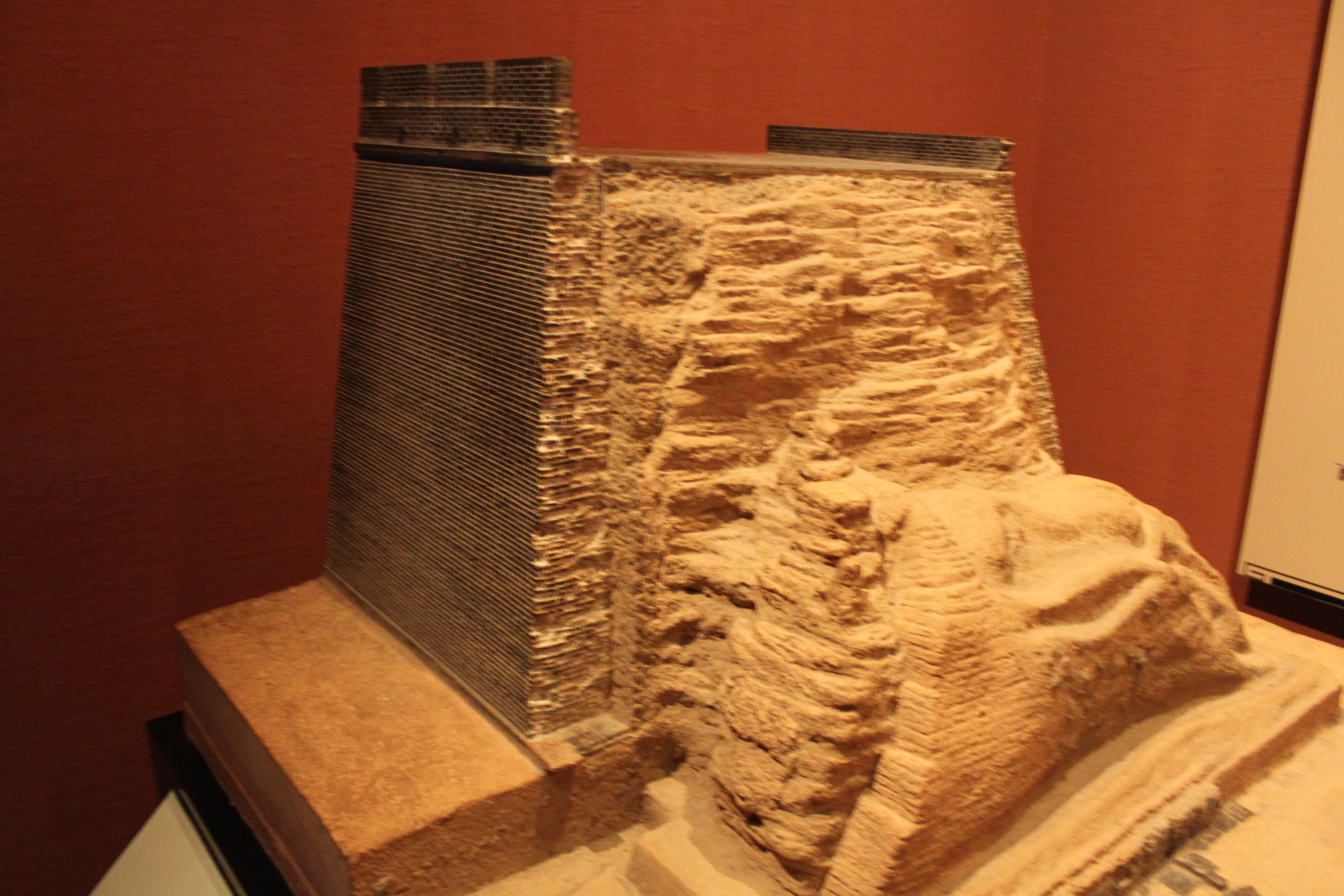
A model of a typical Chinese city wall.

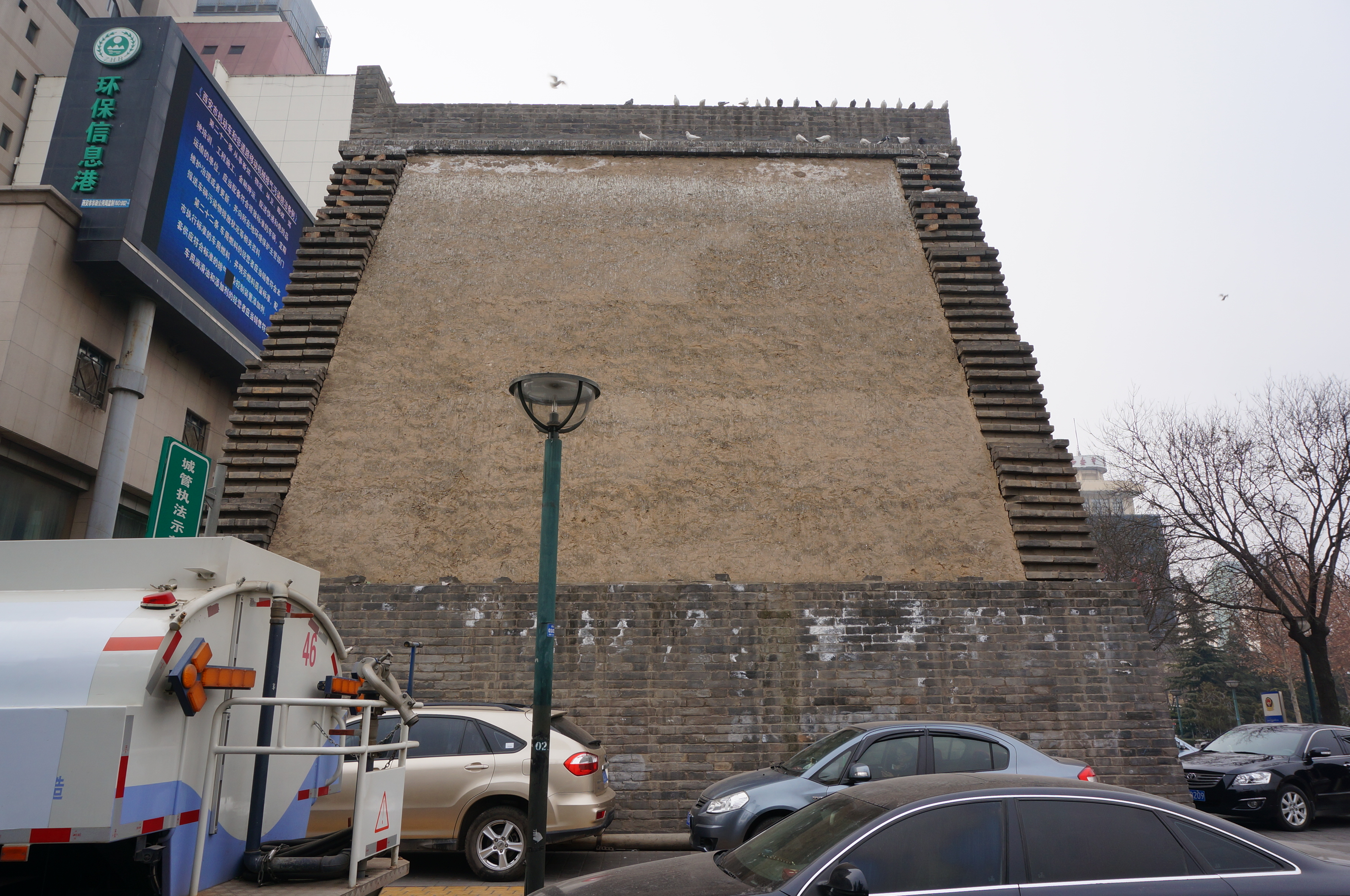
Defensive wall of Prince Qin Mansion, a citadel within Xi'an

Before the introduction of modern artillery, city walls were almost indestructible. Their solidity made any attempt to breach them by mining or bombardment a difficult task. Their height, ranging mostly from five to fifteen meters, made an escalade difficult and hazardous, even though the escalade for military use had been invented as early as the fourth century BCE. A city resolutely defended could withstand attack from the largest armies, and Chinese history includes many tales of famous sieges and heroic defenses. To raze the walls of a city was considered such an exhaustive task that even if the walls had all been destroyed and the enemy thus able to penetrate, their exhausted forces could hardly meet the fresh strength of the defenders. Even in modern warfare city walls continued to play a vital role in the Chinese concept of effective defense.

— Sen-Dou Chang

While China was the birthplace of gunpowder the guns there remained relatively small and light, weighing 80 kilograms or less for the large ones, and only a couple kilograms at most for the small ones during the early Ming era. Guns themselves had proliferated throughout China and become a common sight during sieges, so the question has arisen then why large guns were not first developed in China. According to Tonio Andrade, this was not a matter of metallurgy, which was sophisticated in China, and the Ming dynasty did construct large guns in the 1370s, but never followed up afterwards. Nor was it the lack of warfare, which other historians have suggested to be the case, but does not stand up to scrutiny as walls were a constant factor of war which stood in the way of many Chinese armies since time immemorial into the twentieth century. The answer Andrade provides is simply that Chinese walls were much less vulnerable to bombardment. Andrade argues that traditional Chinese walls were built differently from medieval European walls in ways which made them more resistant to cannon fire.

Chinese walls were bigger than medieval European walls. In the mid-twentieth century a European expert in fortification commented on their immensity: "in China … the principal towns are surrounded to the present day by walls so substantial, lofty, and formidable that the medieval fortifications of Europe are puny in comparison." Chinese walls were thick. Ming prefectural and provincial capital walls were 10 to 20 metres (33 to 66 ft) thick at the base and 5 to 10 metres (16 to 33 ft) at the top.

In Europe the height of wall construction was reached under the Roman Empire, whose walls often reached 10 metres (33 ft) in height, the same as many Chinese city walls, but were only 1.5 to 2.5 metres (4 ft 11 in to 8 ft 2 in) thick. Rome's Servian Walls reached 3.6 and 4 metres (12 and 13 ft) in thickness and 6 to 10 metres (20 to 33 ft) in height. Other fortifications also reached these specifications across the empire, but all these paled in comparison to contemporary Chinese walls, which could reach a thickness of 20 metres (66 ft) at the base in extreme cases. Even the walls of Constantinople which have been described as "the most famous and complicated system of defence in the civilized world," could not match up to a major Chinese city wall. Had both the outer and inner walls of Constantinople been combined, they would have only reached roughly a bit more than a third the width of a major wall in China. According to Philo the width of a wall had to be 4.5 metres (15 ft) thick to be able to withstand artillery. European walls of the 1200s and 1300s could reach the Roman equivalents but rarely exceeded them in length, width, and height, remaining around 2 metres (6 ft 7 in) thick. It is apt to note that when referring to a very thick wall in medieval Europe, what is usually meant is a wall of 2.5 metres (8 ft 2 in) in width, which would have been considered thin in a Chinese context. There are some exceptions such as the Hillfort of Otzenhausen, a Celtic ringfort with a thickness of 40 metres (130 ft) in some parts, but Celtic fort-building practices died out in the early medieval period. Andrade goes on to note that the walls of the marketplace of Chang'an were thicker than the walls of major European capitals.

Aside from their immense size, Chinese walls were also structurally different from the ones built in medieval Europe. Medieval European walls for castles were mostly constructed of stone interspersed with gravel or rubble filling and bonded by limestone mortar. Chinese walls used a variety of different materials depending on the availability of resources and the time period - ranging from stones to bricks to rammed earth. Sometimes, different sections of the same wall used different materials and construction techniques - such as one section being made of stones and another section being made of rammed earth. By the medieval period, Chinese walls with rammed earthen cores which absorbed the energy of artillery shots were common. Rammed earth walls also helped prevent intrusion by mining since only localized sections would collapse. Walls were constructed using wooden frameworks which were filled with layers of earth tamped down to a highly compact state, and once that was completed the frameworks were removed for use in the next wall section. During certain time periods such as the Song dynasty and later, rammed earth walls were covered with an outer layer of bricks or stone to prevent erosion, and during the Ming, earthworks were interspersed with stone and rubble. Most Chinese walls were also sloped, which better deflected projectile energy, rather than vertical.

The defensive response to cannon in Europe was to build relatively low and thick walls of packed earth, which could both withstand the force of cannon balls and support their own, defensive cannon. Chinese wall-building practice was, by happenstance, extremely resistant to all forms of battering. This held true into the twentieth century, when even modern explosive shells had some difficulty in breaking through tamped earth walls.

— Peter Lorge

The Chinese Wall Theory essentially rests on a cost benefit hypothesis, where the Ming recognized the highly resistant nature of their walls to structural damage, and could not imagine any affordable development of the guns available to them at the time to be capable of breaching said walls. Even as late as the 1490s a Florentine diplomat considered the French claim that "their artillery is capable of creating a breach in a wall of eight feet in thickness" to be ridiculous and the French "braggarts by nature." Very rarely did cannons blast breaches in city walls in Chinese warfare. This may have been partly due to cultural tradition. Famous military commanders such as Sun Tzu and Zheng Zhilong recommended not to directly attack cities and storm their walls. Even when direct assaults were made with cannons, it was usually by focusing on the gates rather than the walls. There were instances where cannons were used against walled fortifications, such as by Koxinga, but only in the case of small villages. During Koxinga's career, there is only one recorded case of capturing a settlement by bombarding its walls: the siege of Taizhou in 1658. In 1662, the Dutch found that bombarding the walls of a town in Fujian Province had no effect and they focused on the gates instead just as in Chinese warfare. In 1841, a 74-gun British warship bombarded a Chinese coastal fort near Guangzhou and found that it was "almost impervious to the efforts of horizontal fire." In fact twentieth century explosive shells had some difficulty creating a breach in tamped earthen walls.

We fought our way to Nanking and joined in the attack on the enemy capital in December. It was our unit which stormed the Chunghua Gate. We attacked continuously for about a week, battering the brick and earth walls with artillery, but they never collapsed. The night of December 11, men in my unit breached the wall. The morning came with most of our unit still behind us, but we were beyond the wall. Behind the gate great heaps of sandbags were piled up. We 'cleared them away, removed the lock, and opened the gates, with a great creaking noise. We'd done it! We'd opened the fortress! All the enemy ran away, so we didn't take any fire. The residents too were gone. When we passed beyond the fortress wall we thought we had occupied this city.

— Nohara Teishin, on the Japanese capture of Nanjing in 1937

Why the Chinese Communists could not take the city of Tatung is a puzzle, although they besieged it for 45 days last summer. All you need to do is to look at the outer wall, and then the inner ones.... In places, the masonry is at least 50 feet thick. Communist artillery shells may have been able to play havoc with the old wooden drum tower above one gate, but they could not make more than dents and scratches on the brick work.

— R. Stead

Andrade goes on to question whether or not Europeans would have developed large artillery pieces in the first place had they faced the more formidable Chinese style walls, coming to the conclusion that such exorbitant investments in weapons unable to serve their primary purpose would not have been ideal.

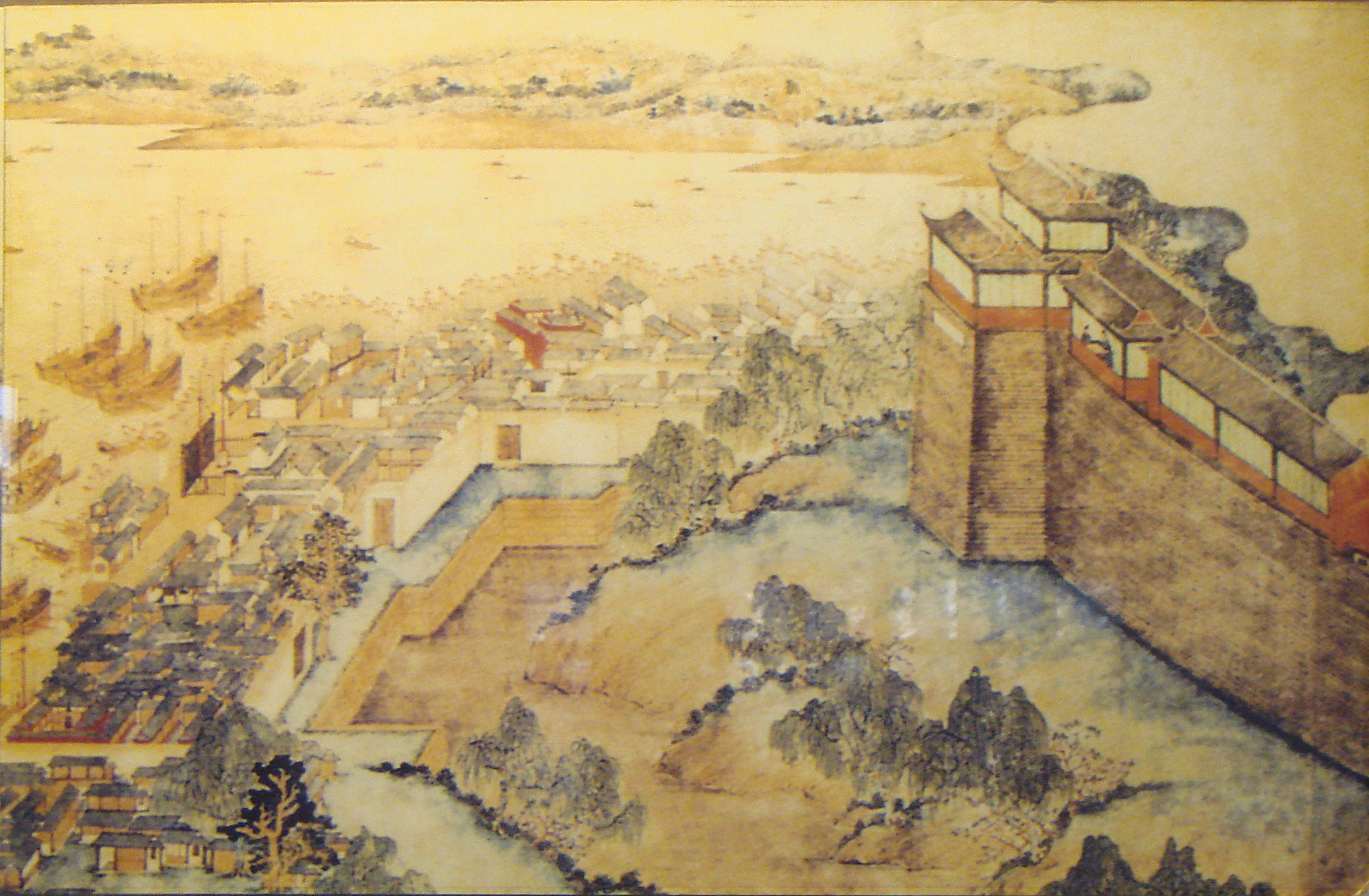
Old City of Shanghai with walls and seafront.

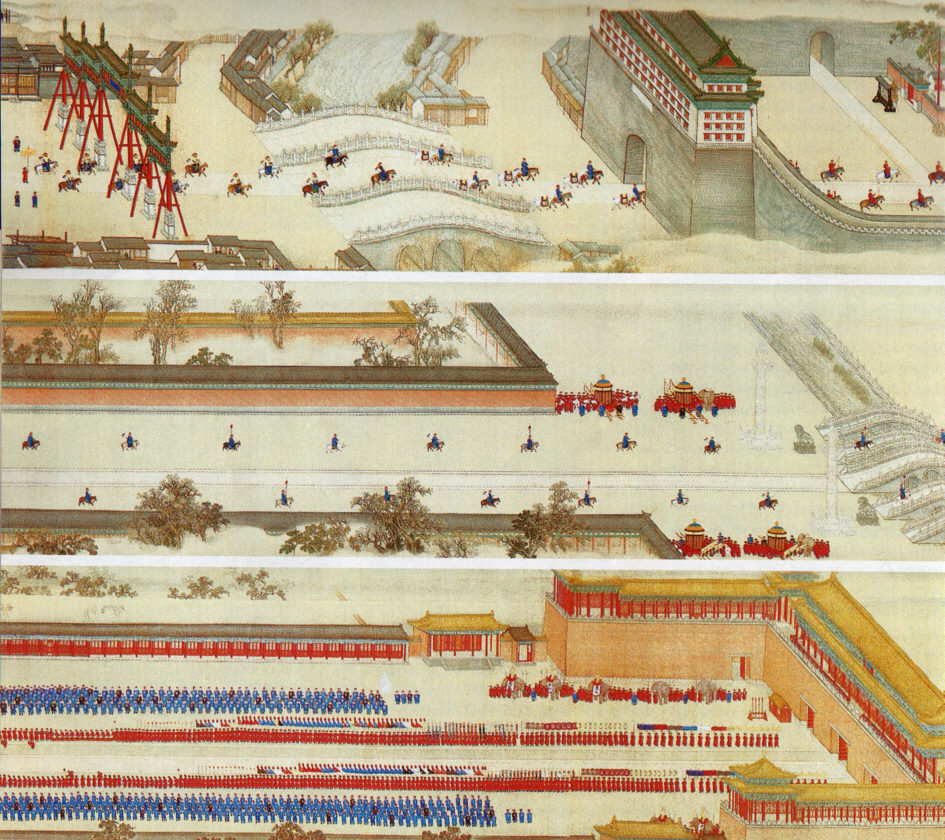
Sections of a court painting depicting the Emperor's entry into Beijing in 1689. The first section shows, at right, the barbican at today's Qianmen gate. The third section shows, at right, the Meridian Gate in the south wall of the Forbidden City.

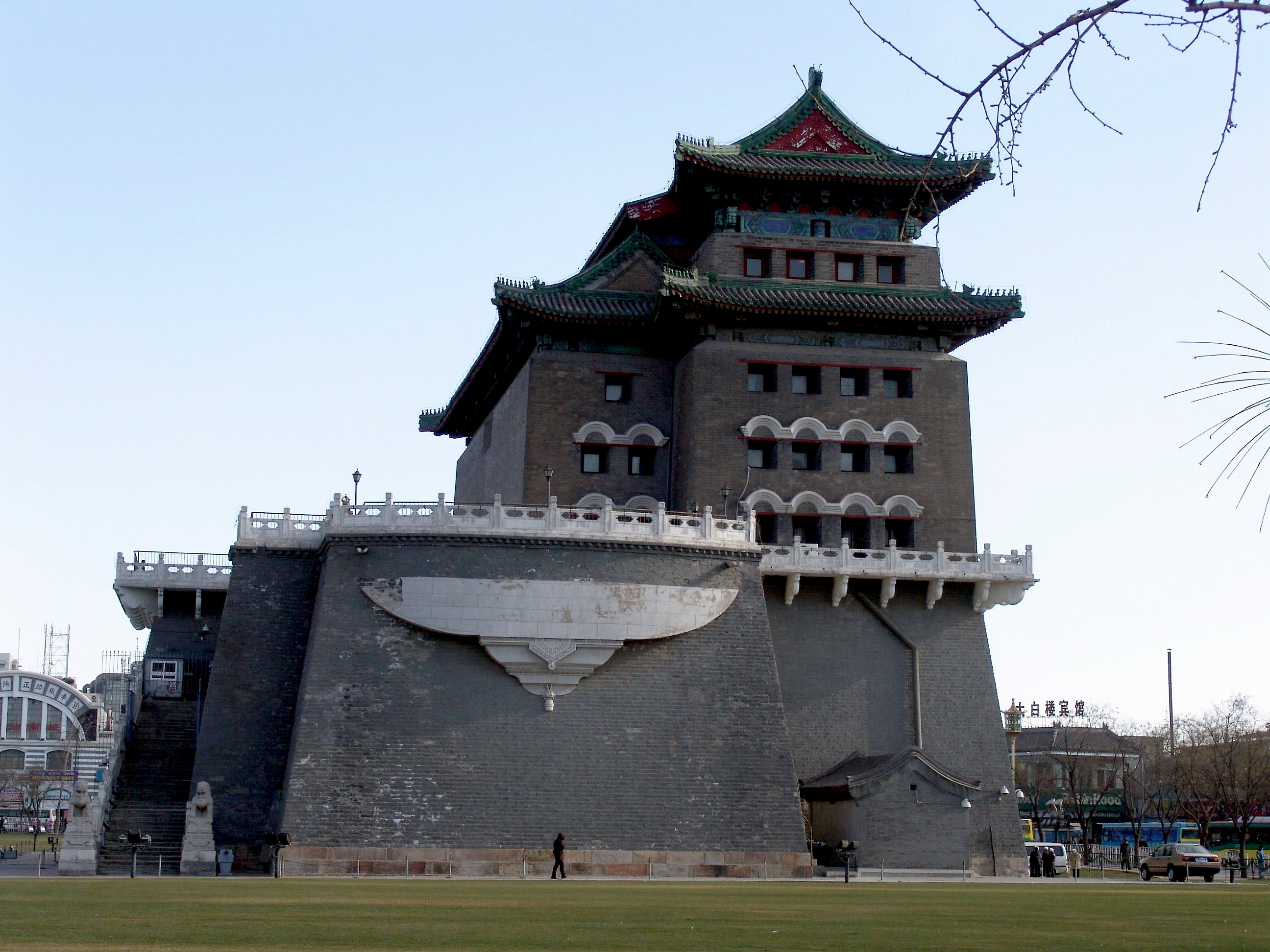
Archery tower of the Zhengyangmen Gate, the front gate of the Inner City of Beijing; rebuilt in 1914 with the additions of cannon placements

== Extant city walls ==
The city walls of Beijing, the last imperial capital of China, survived in substantially complete form into the 1950s. But apart from the Forbidden City, whose walls remain well-preserved, city walls from the Ming dynasty have suffered wholesale demolition in the decades since. The only surviving sections are Qianmen's gate and arrow tower, Deshengmen's arrow tower, a section of the wall and Southeast Corner Tower preserved in the Ming City Wall Relics Park, and the Xibianmen corner tower. The Yongdingmen Gate was rebuilt in 2005.

Of the walls of other major historical cities, those of Nanjing, Xi'an and Kaifeng are notable for their state of preservation. The walls of Nanjing and Xi'an are Ming dynasty originals with extensive Qing dynasty and modern restorations, while the wall of Kaifeng visible today is largely the result of Qing dynasty restoration.

The walls of some smaller cities and towns have survived more or less intact. These include the walls of Pingyao in Shanxi, Dali in Yunnan, Jingzhou in Hubei, and Xingcheng in Liaoning. Smaller garrison towns or fortifications include Diaoyu near Chongqing, Wanping county fortifications near Marco Polo Bridge in Beijing, the garrison town of Shanhai Pass, Jinyuan District in Taiyuan, Wanquan District in Zhangjiakou, Yongtai turtle town, Guangfu Ancient City in Hebei, Zhaoqing in Guangdong, and Qiansuo in Huludao, Liaoning.

Isolated remnants and some modern recreations can be seen today in many other cities. The walls of Luoyang in Henan survive as heavily eroded remains. The surviving walls of Shangqiu in Henan, while extensive, have heavily deteriorated over time. Only small parts of the city walls protecting the Confucian compound in Qufu are authentic, the rest having been demolished in 1978 and rebuilt in recent years. Some isolated gates of Hangzhou and Suzhou (especially Panmen Gate) have either survived or been rebuilt. Substantial remains of the gates of Zhengding in Hebei have survived but the walls have largely been stripped to their earthen core. One small section of the city wall of Shanghai is visible today.

Here is a full list of cities with intact city walls:

- Beijing, see City Wall of Beijing. Many parts of the walls of Beijing were demolished during the 1960s to open large streets around the city. A metro line also follows the location of the former city walls.
- Xiangyang
- Dali
- Shangqiu
- Jianshui
- Zhangjiakou, see Wanquan District
- Zhaoqing
- Guangfu Ancient City
- Xingcheng
- Liaocheng
- Kaifeng
- Qiansuo in Huludao
- Datong
- Daming County
- Yongtai Fortress
- Jingzhou
- Nanjing, see City Wall of Nanjing
- Linhai
- Qufu
- Taiyuan, see Jinyuan District
- Pingyao
- Shanghai (Old City (Shanghai) - largely destroyed in 1912, only fragments survive
- Songpan
- Walled villages can still be found in Mainland China and Hong Kong.
- Xi'an - The city of Xi'an has well-preserved walls with a water filled moat that is a tourist attraction incorporating small parks surrounding a busy and modern area of the city.
- Zhengding

== Dimensions of famous city walls ==
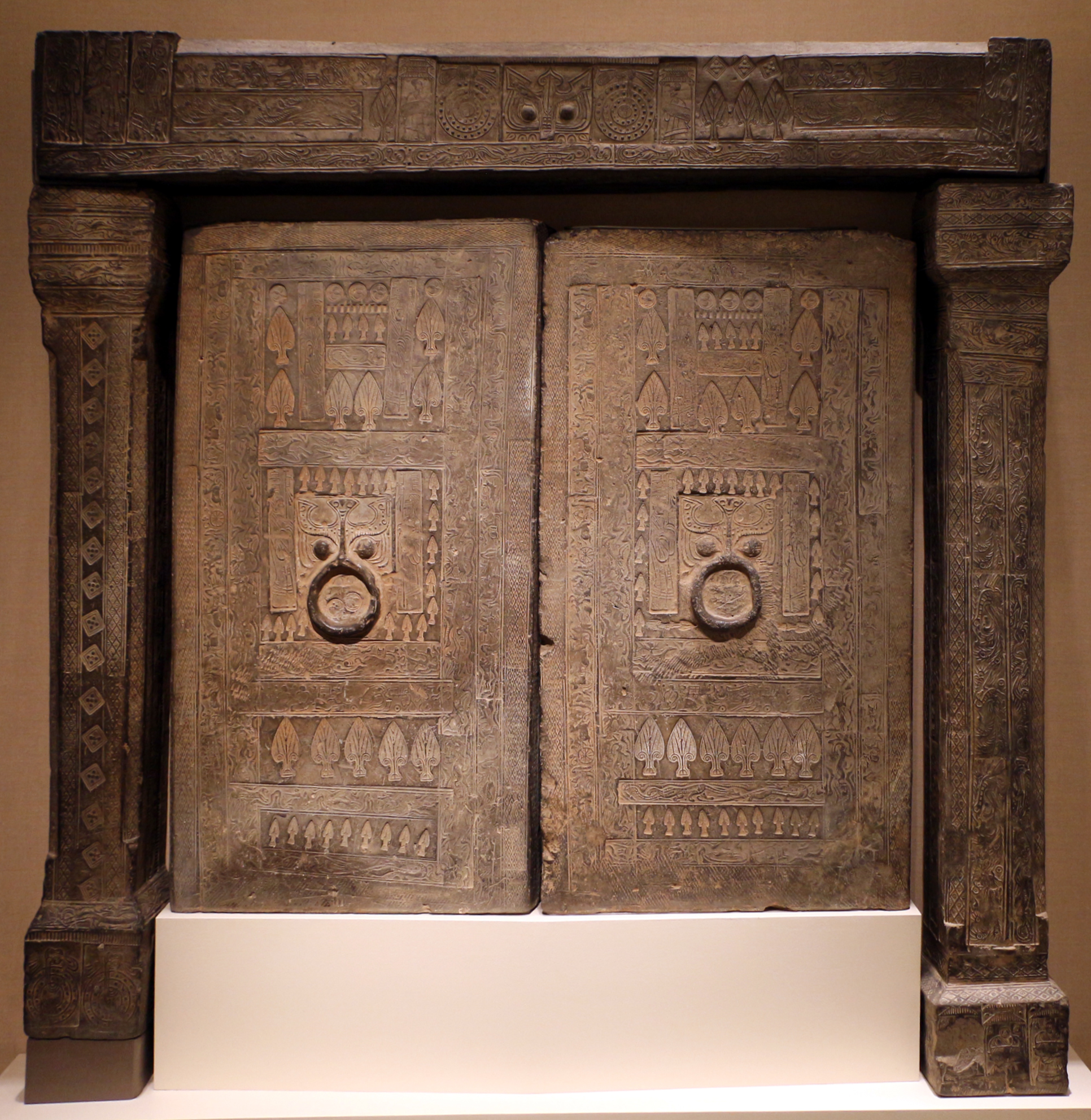
Miniature gate, Han dynasty

Wall	Width (m)		Height (m)		Length (km)
Wall	Max.	Min.	Max.	Min.	Length (km)
Beijing (inner)	20	12	15		24
Beijing (outer)	15	4.5	7	6	28
Chang'an	16	12	12		26
Forbidden City	8.6	6.6	8		
Khanbaliq			10.6		
Linzi	42	26			
Luoyang	25		11		12
Pingyao	12	3	10	8	6
Suzhou	11	5	7		
Xi'an	18	12	12		14
Xiangyang			10.8		7.3
Zhongdu			12		24

== Gallery ==
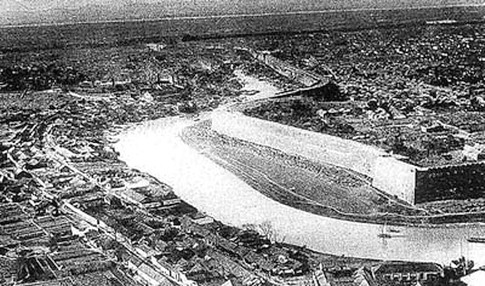
Aerial shot of Nanjing city wall 1930.

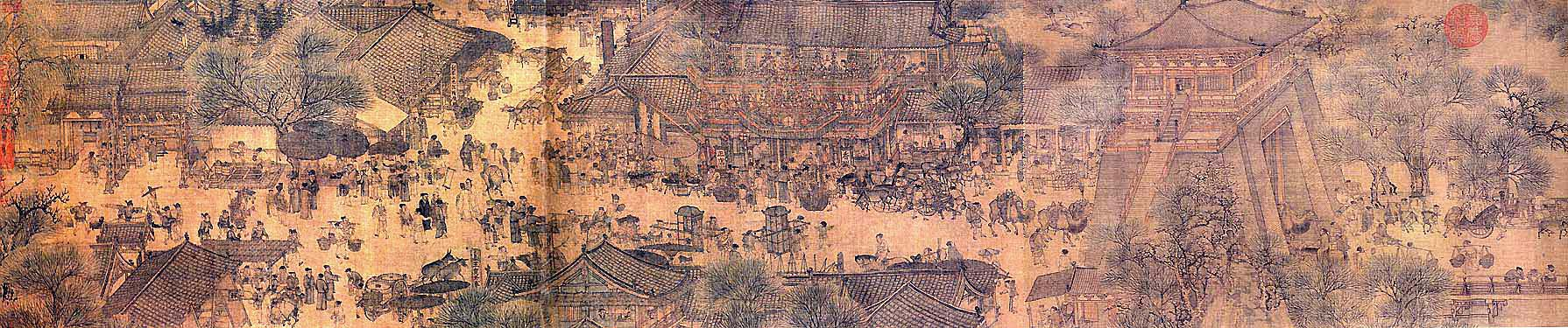
A fortified gatehouse leading into a city, perhaps Kaifeng, from the early 12th century Song painting Along the River During the Qingming Festival by Zhang Zeduan (1085–1145)

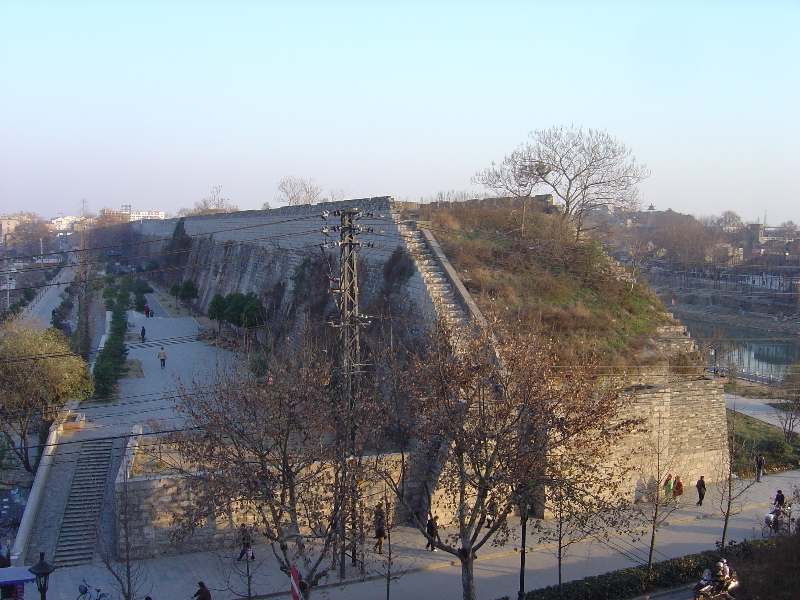
Eroded section of Nanjing city wall

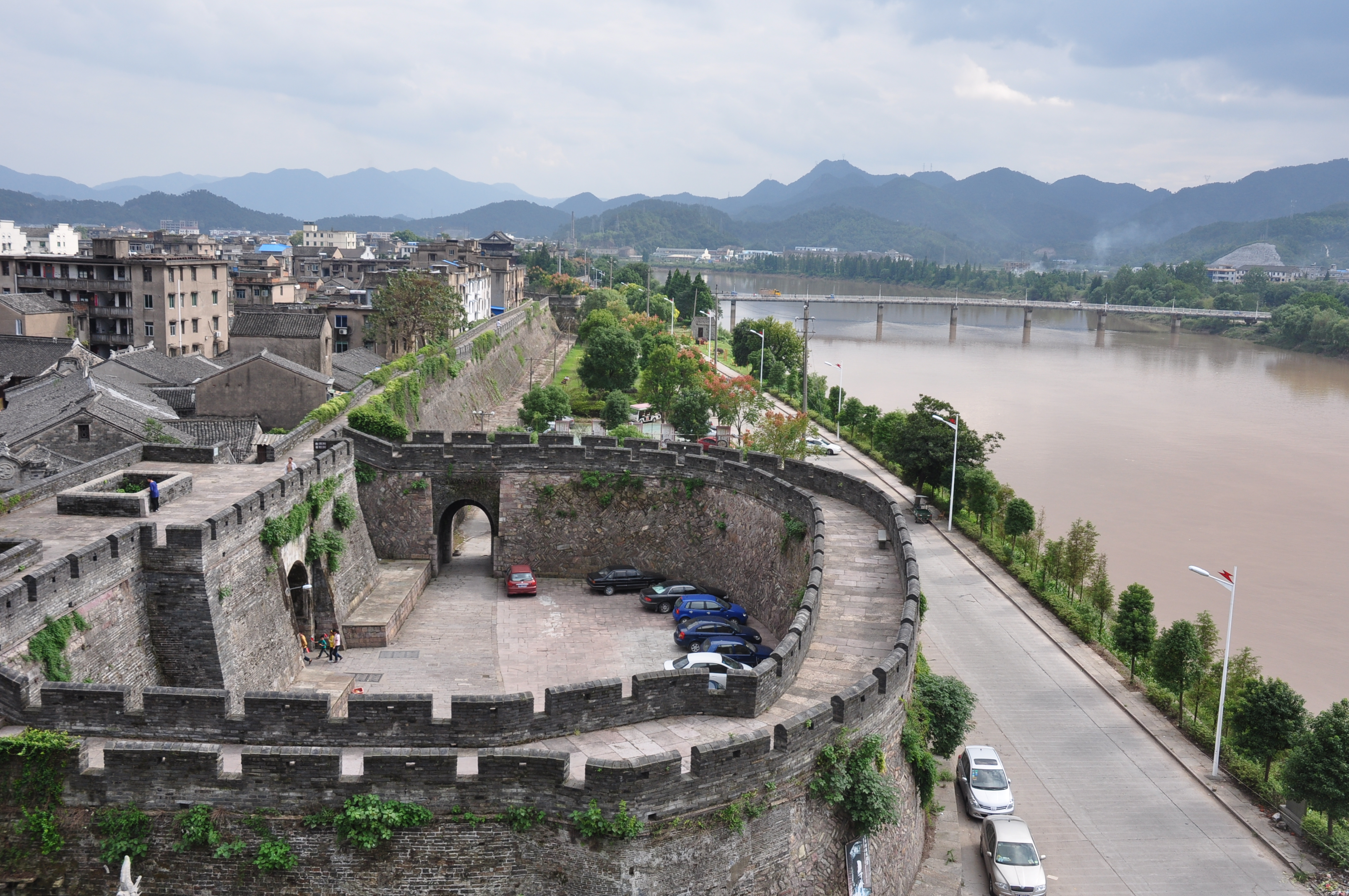
Barbican of Linhai city wall

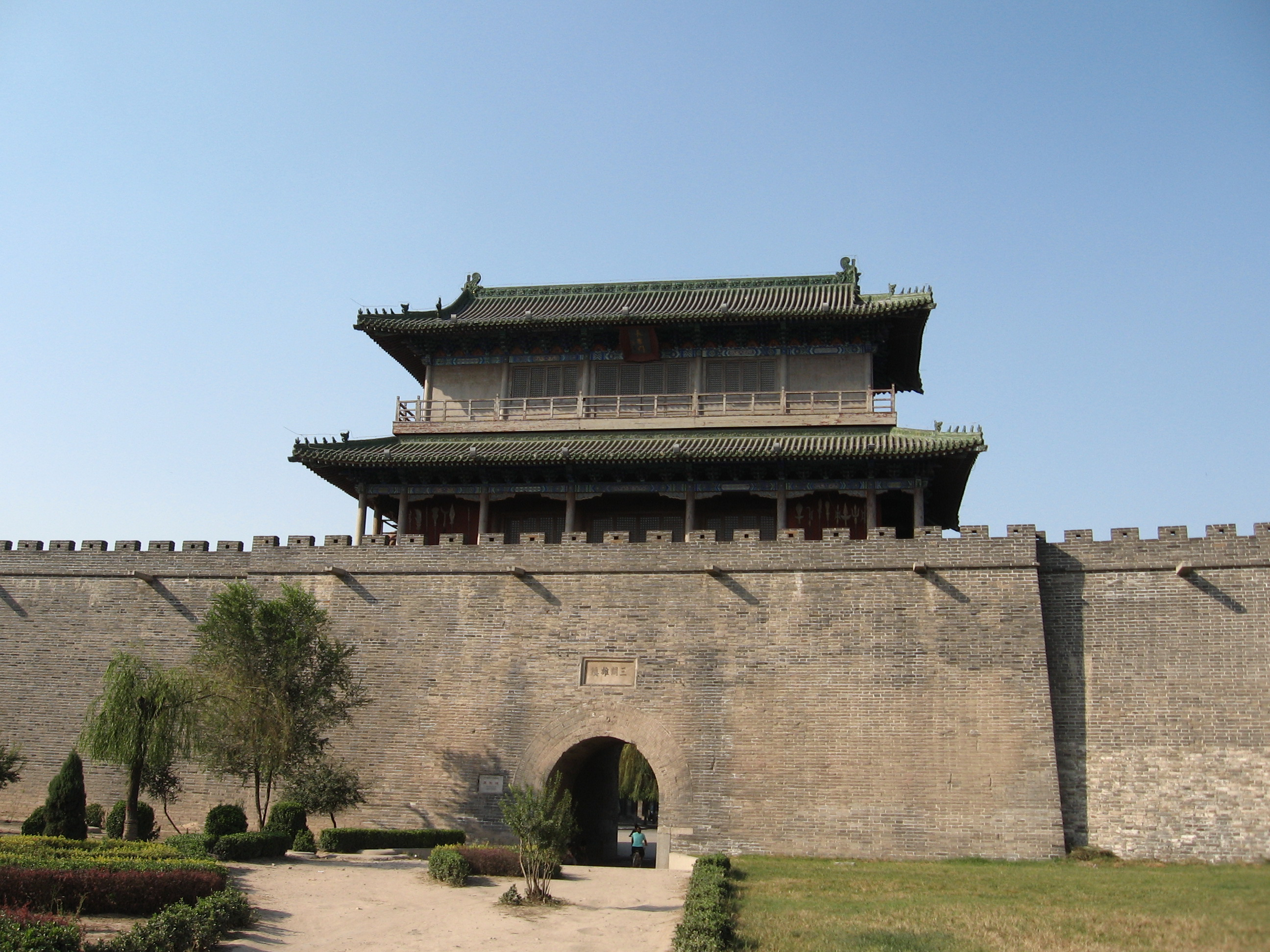
Changle Gate of Zhengding city wall

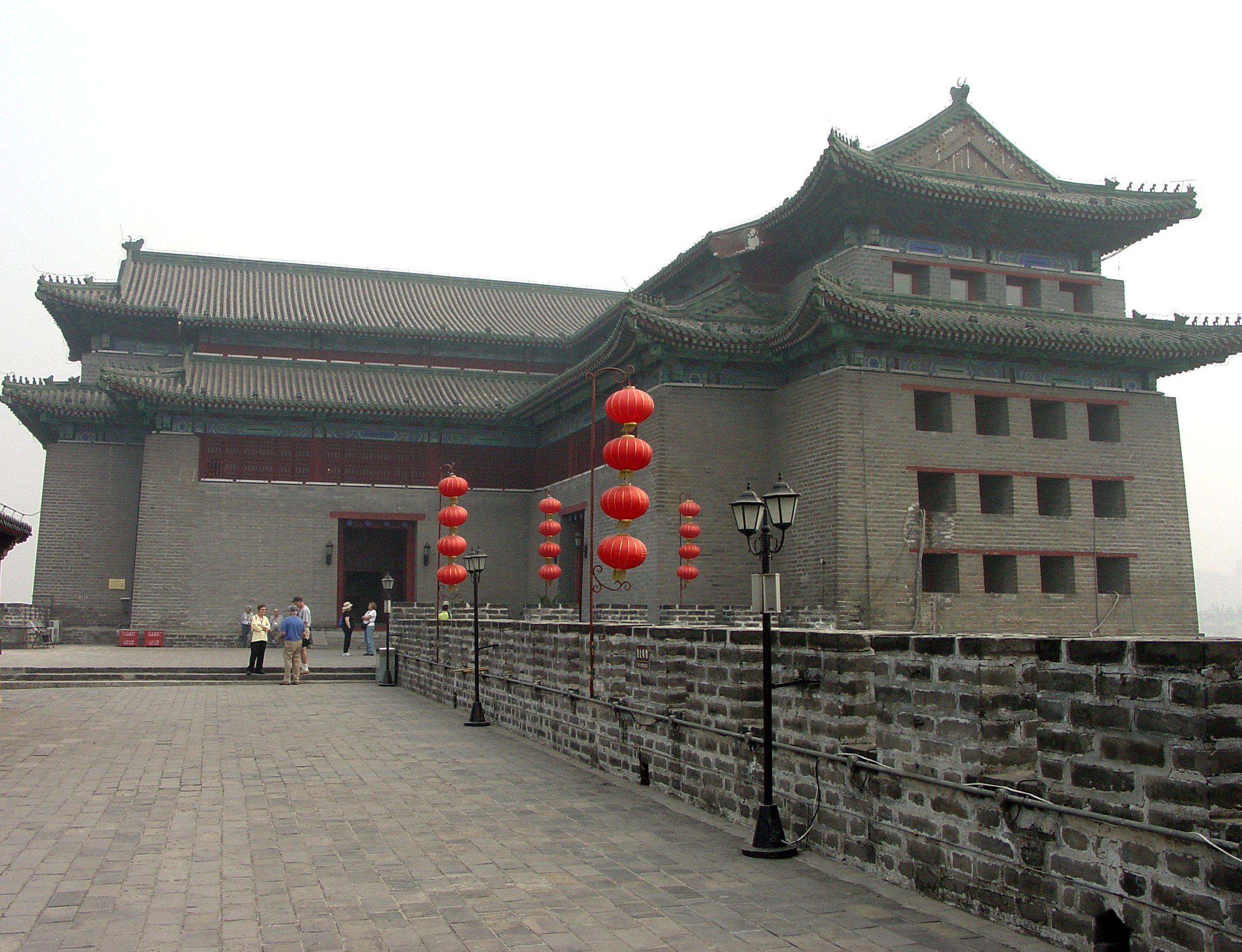
City Wall, SE Corner. Beijing.

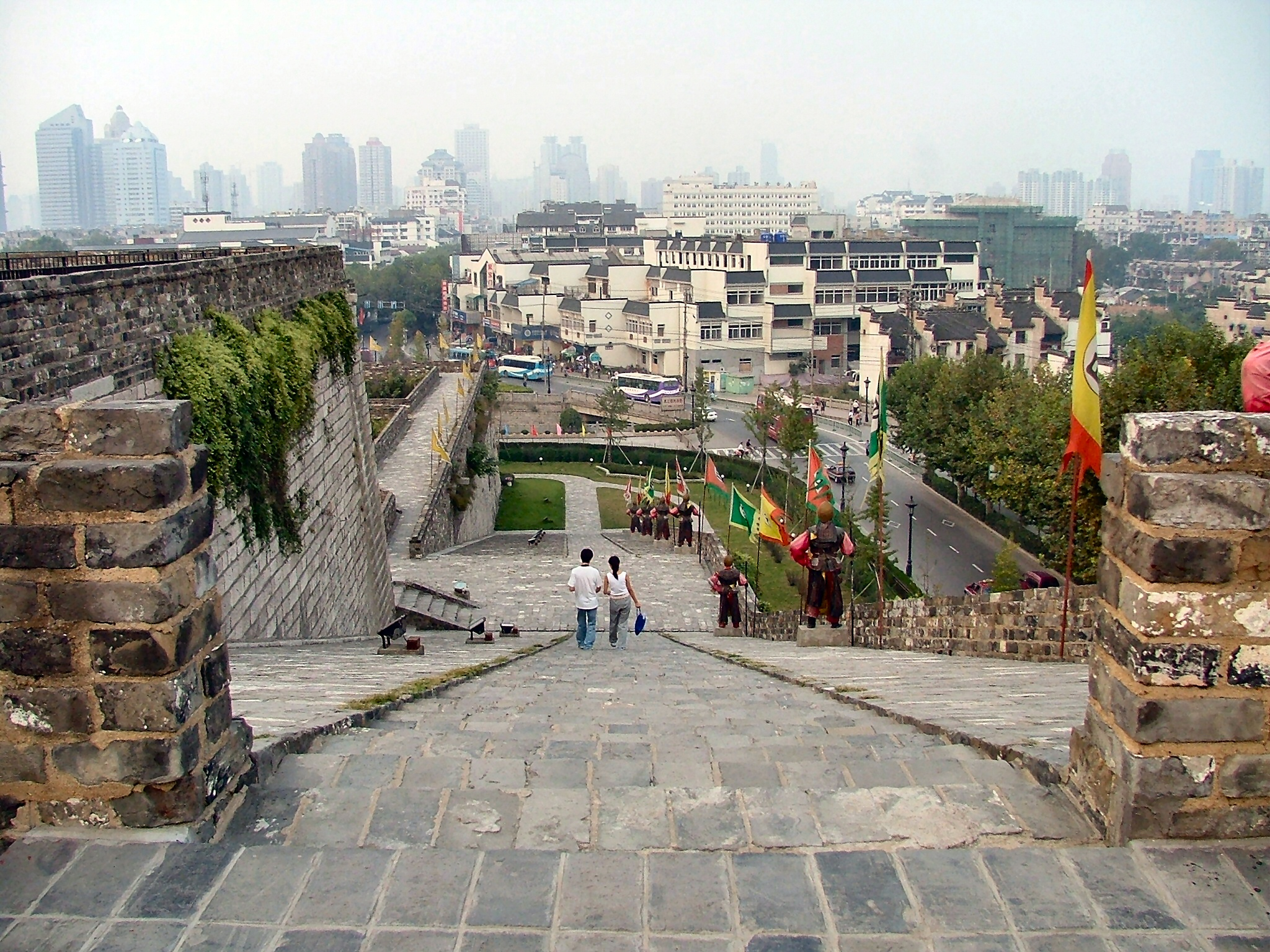
Horse ramp of Gate of China, Nanjing

== See also ==
- Great Wall of China
- Sichuan anti-Mongol fortresses

== Bibliography ==
- Andrade, Tonio (2016), The Gunpowder Age: China, Military Innovation, and the Rise of the West in World History, Princeton University Press, ISBN 978-0-691-13597-7.
- Chang, Sen-Dou (1970), Some Observations on the Morphology of Chinese Walled Cities
- Cook, Haruko Taya (2000), Japan At War: An Oral History, Phoenix Press
- Lorge, Peter A. (2008), The Asian Military Revolution: from Gunpowder to the Bomb, Cambridge University Press, ISBN 978-0-521-60954-8
- Needham, Joseph (1971), Science and Civilization in China, vol. 4–3
- Needham, Joseph (1986), Science and Civilization in China, vol. 5, Part 6, Taipei: Caves Books Ltd.
- Purton, Peter (2009), A History of the Early Medieval Siege c.450-1200, The Boydell Press
- Reger, William (2016), The Limits of Empire: European Imperial Formations in Early Modern World History, Taylor & Francis
- Síren, Osvald (1924), The Walls and Gates of Peking
- Toy, Sidney (2006), History of Fortification from 3000 BC to AD 1700, Barnsley: Pen and Sword, ISBN 1844153584 (1st ed. 1955; 2nd ed. 1966)
- Turnbull, Stephen (2009), Chinese Walled Cities 221 BC-AD 1644, Osprey Publishing
