= Pan Gate =

Coordinates: 31°17′21″N 120°36′43″E

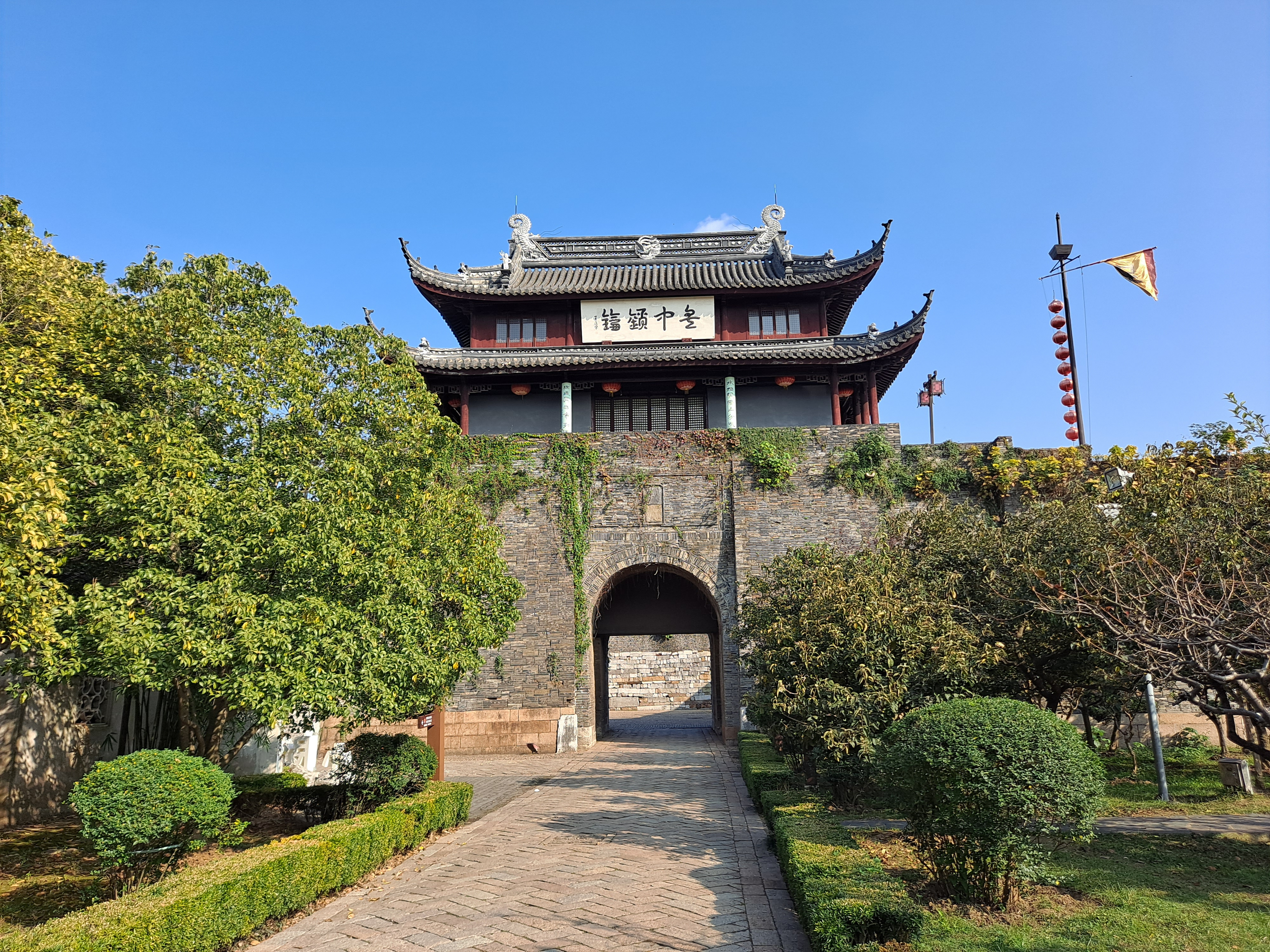
- The Panmen Land Gate
- Traditional Chinese: 盤門
- Simplified Chinese: 盘门
Transcriptions
Standard Mandarin
- Hanyu Pinyin: Pánmén
- Wade–Giles: Pan-men
Wu
- Suzhounese: boe^{2} men^{2} [bø mən]

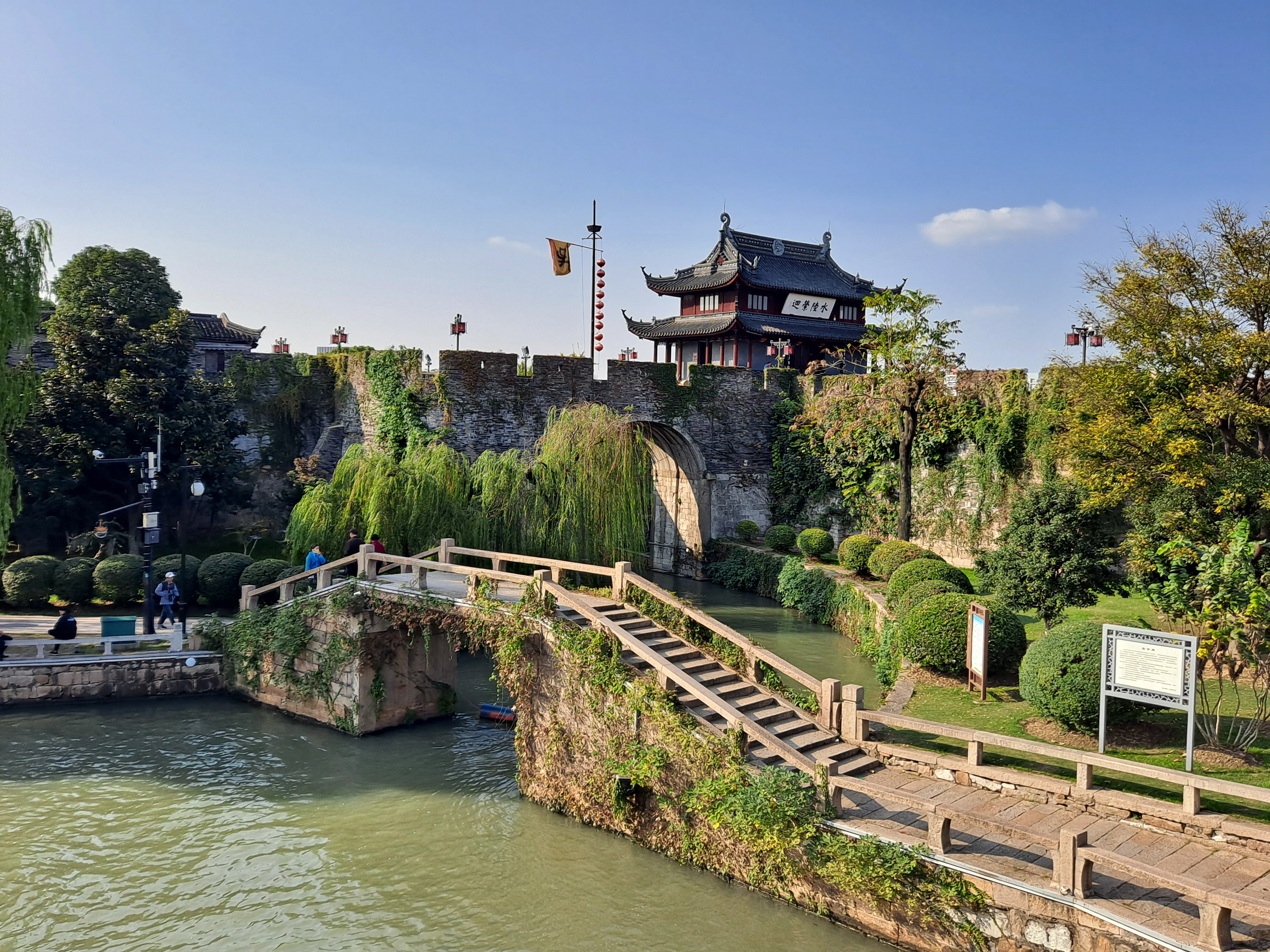
The Wu Gate Bridge in front of Panmen Gate

Pan Gate, Panmen, or Panmen Gate is a historical landmark in Suzhou, Jiangsu Province, China. It consists of a section of the old Suzhou City Wall that includes two separate gates, one opening to a road for pedestrian and vehicular traffic and another opening to a canal for waterborne vessels. It is thus sometimes known as Suzhou's Land and Water Gate. Pan Gate at the southwest corner of the city's central historic district, with the water gate connecting the city's inner canals and former defensive moat with the nearby Grand Canal.

== History ==
A gate has stood at the location since the construction of the city wall of Wu in 514 BC, during the Spring and Autumn Period of the later Zhou dynasty. At that time, Pan Gate was the only entrance or exit from the city. The present structure was built c. 1351 during the 11th year of the reign of Ukhaatu Khan, the Zhizheng Emperor of the Yuan dynasty.

== Present site ==
Following Deng Xiaoping's Reform and Opening Up Policy, Suzhou has established the Pan Gate Scenic Area to renovate the "Three Landmarks of Pan Gate" and improve tourist facilities in the vicinity. In addition to the gates themselves, the landmarks include the Ruiguang Pagoda (Ruiguangta) and the Wu Gate Bridge (Wumenqiao). Originally dating to AD 247, the Ruiguang Pagoda is the oldest of the city's pagodas, constructed of brick walls with wooden platforms at each floor. It has simple Buddhist carvings at its base. The Wu Gate Bridge provided access to the land gate over the canals and was the highest bridge of the ancient city, allowing barges and other boats to more easily pass below.

Alongside Fengshan Gate in Hangzhou, Pan Gate is now also protected as a World Heritage site owing to its importance to the Grand Canal.

== See also ==
- City Wall of Suzhou
