= Fortifications of Xi'an =

City walls and stone turrets strewn throughout the Chinese city of Xi'an

Fortifications of Xi'an Xi'an City Wall
- 西安城牆
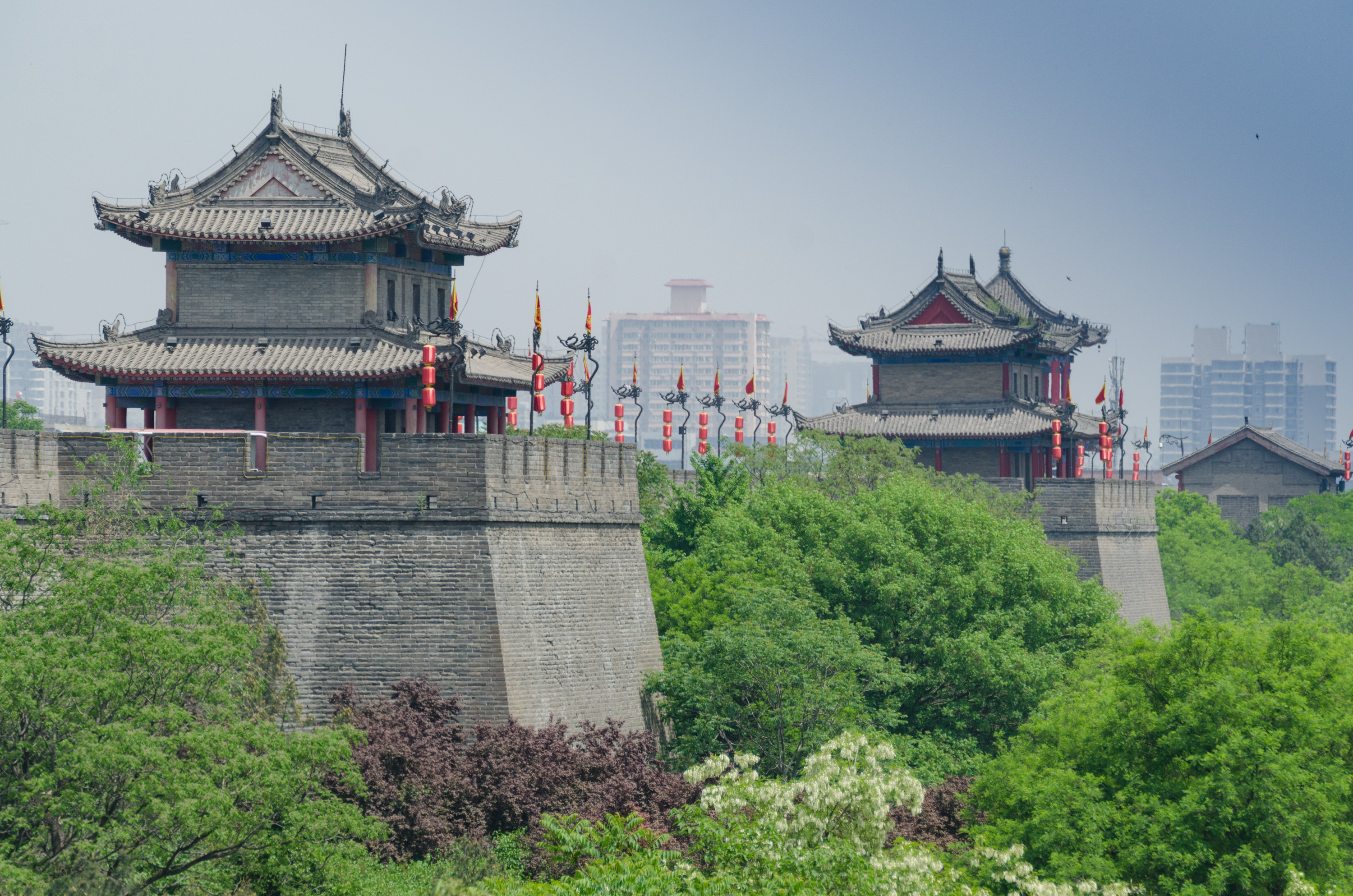
- Xi'an City Wall
- Interactive map of the Fortifications of Xi'an; Xi'an City Wall area

General information
- Type: Fortification
- Location: People's Republic of China
- Coordinates: 34.2534295°N 108.9423371°E

Technical details
- Size: 13.74 km (8.54 mi)

The fortifications of Xi'an in Shaanxi, also known as the Xi'an City Wall (Chinese: 西安城牆, Xī'ān Chéngqiáng), represent one of the oldest, largest, and best preserved Chinese city walls. It was built under the rule of the Hongwu Emperor of the Ming dynasty to protect the city from the Northern Yuan and potential unrest. It exhibits the "complete features of the rampart architecture of feudal society". It has been refurbished many times since it was first built in the 14th century with the most important three reconstructions occurring in the late 1500s, in the late 1700s, and in 1983. The wall encloses an area of about 11.52 square kilometres (4.45 mi^{2}).

The Xi'an City Wall is on UNESCO's Tentative List as part of "City Walls of the Ming and Qing Dynasties", submitted by China in 2008. In March 1961, it was designated among China's first Major National Historical and Cultural Sites.

== Location ==
Xi'an City Wall is located in the urban district of Xi'an City, which at one time was an imperial city during the periods of the Sui and Tang dynasties. It is situated at the end of the ancient Silk Road.

== History ==
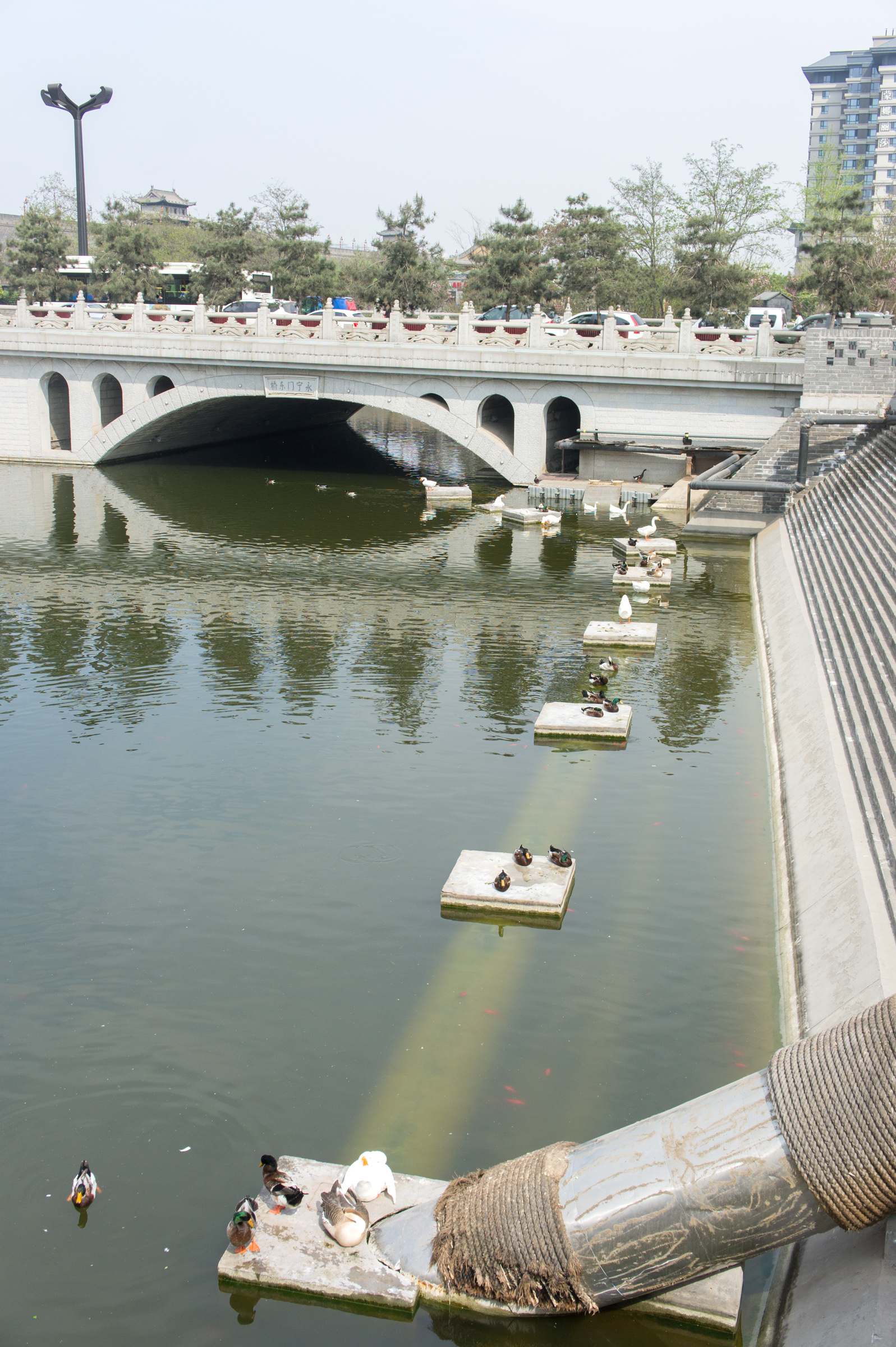
City Moat of Xi'an

Zhu Yuanzhang, the first Emperor of the Ming dynasty (1368–1644), was advised by Zhu Sheng, a sage, to build a fortified high wall around the city, create storage facilities for food and then establish his empire by unifying all the other states. Following the hermit's advice, Zhu established the Ming dynasty, and then built a highly fortified wall over an existing palace wall from the Tang dynasty (618–907). He started building the Xi'an City Wall, as the capital of northwestern Shaanxi Province in 1370. He incorporated the ancient fortified embankments built by the Sui and Tang dynasties by including them in the wall's western and southern parts, enlarging the eastern and northern parts. The edifice was built over an eight-year period and was well maintained during both the Ming dynasty, and the Qing dynasty, which followed.

The wall was initially built solely from tamped earth. During the Longqing Emperor's period (1568) the wall was strengthened by laying blue bricks on the top and exterior faces of the earthen walls. During the reign of Qianlong of the Qing dynasty (1781), the wall was enlarged; drainage features, crenels and other modifications were made; and the structure as it is now seen came into existence. By the end of the Qing dynasty rule, the structure had begun to deteriorate. In a limited degree the Republican Authorities carried out maintenance of the wall, which was in a poor state. In the first decade of the 20th century, the wall's defense system was considered to be of strategic importance, even though demolishing of similar walls in other regions of the country was undertaken following the 1911 Revolution. In 1926, the wall was attacked with bombs by enemy forces resulting in serious structural damage, but the city within the wall was not affected. During the Second World War, when the Japanese carried out air bombings from 1937 to 1940, the residents built around 1,000 bunkers, as anti-aircraft shelters within the wide base (thickness of more than 15 metres (49 ft)) of the wall. A few escape openings were also made through the wall as passageways. Even later, new gates to allow traffic through the Xi'an Wall were constructed during the Republican rule.

According to the Shenboo Atlas of 1933, in the 1930s most people lived within the perimeter of the Xi'an Wall but still there were a lot of unoccupied open areas. Among the visitors who came to see the Xi'an Wall were American captain (later general) Stilwell in 1922 and the Czech sinologist Jaroslav Průšek (1906–1980) in 1933. In 1983, the administration of the Xi'an municipality carried out more renovations and additions to the wall. At that time, the Yangmacheng tower, the Zhalou sluice tower, the Kuixinglou dipper tower, the Jiaolou corner tower and the Dilou defense tower were all refurbished; the crumbling parts of the rampart were changed into gates; and the moat was restored. In May 2005, all of Xi'an's ramparts were inter-connected.

The Xi'an City Wall was proposed as a UNESCO World Heritage Site by the State Administration of Cultural Heritage of the People's Republic of China in 2008. UNESCO included the site in the tentative List of World Heritage Sites under the title "City Walls of the Ming and Qing Dynasties" as a cultural heritage designee under Criterion iii & iv. In March 1961, the Xi'an City Wall was designated among the first Major National Historical and Cultural Sites.

== Features ==
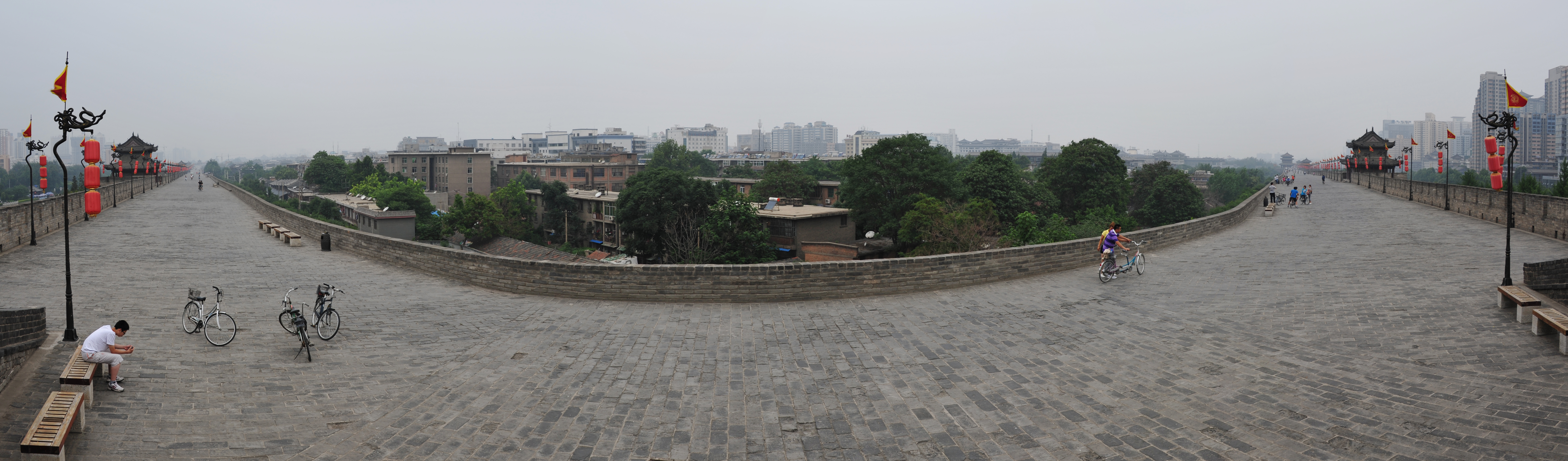
The Xi'an City Wall

The Xi'an Wall is rectangular in shape and has a total length of 13.74 kilometres (8.54 mi), with almost all stretches subjected to some kind of restoration or rebuilding. Along the top of the wall is a walkway, which would typically take four hours to cover. It is built in the Chinese architecture style. As a defense fortification, it was constructed with a moat, drawbridges, watch towers, corner towers, parapet walls and gate towers. The wall is 12 metres (39 ft) in height with a width of 12–14 metres (39–46 ft) at the top and base width of 15–18 metres (49–59 ft). Ramparts are built at intervals of 120 metres (390 ft), projecting from the main wall. There are parapets on the outer side of the wall, built with 5,984 crenels, which form "altogether protruding ramparts". There are four watch towers, located at the corners and the moat that surrounds the wall has a width of 18 metres (59 ft) and depth of 6 metres (20 ft). The area within the wall encloses 11.52 square kilometres (4.45 mi^{2}) occupied by the city.

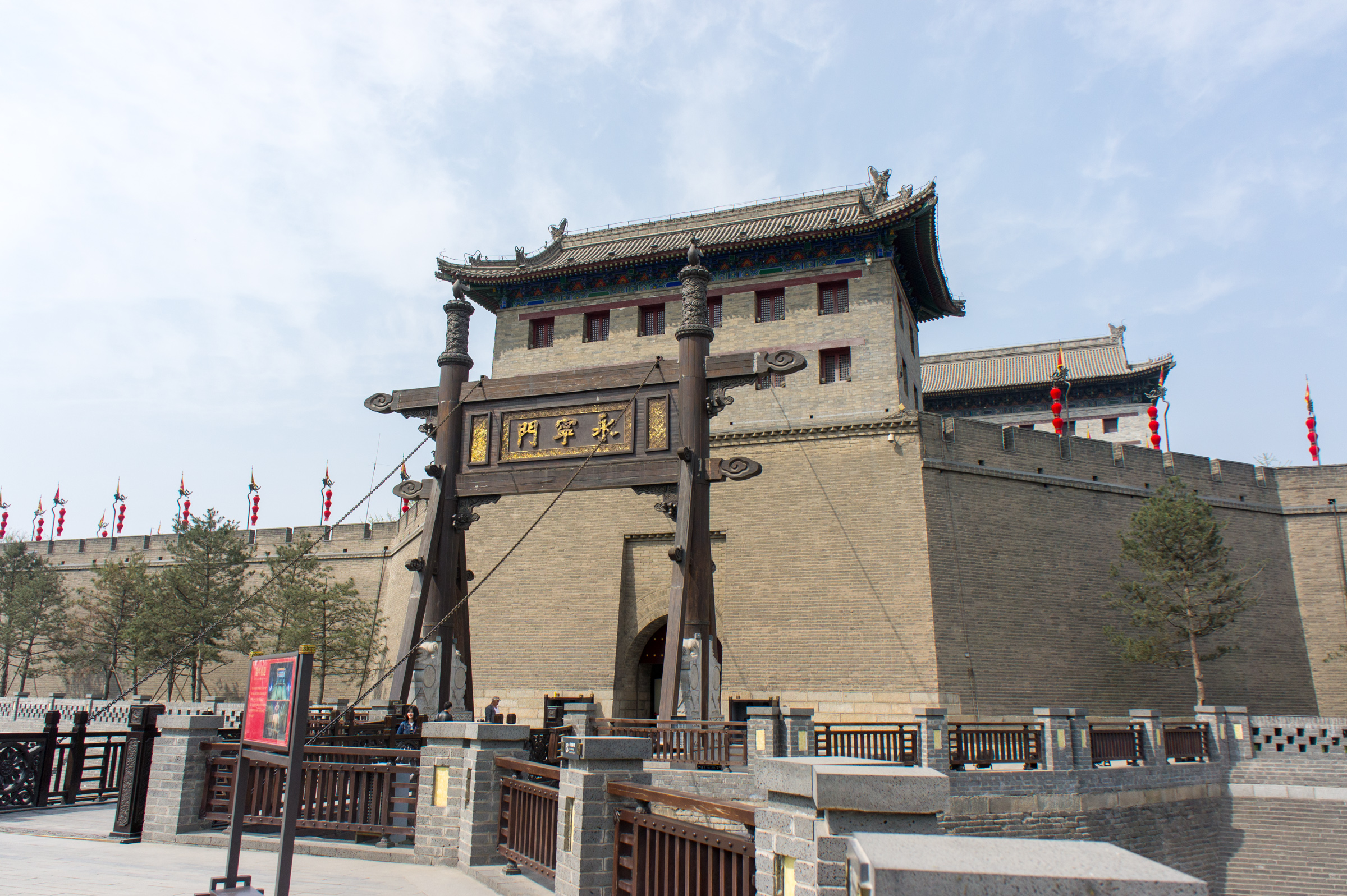
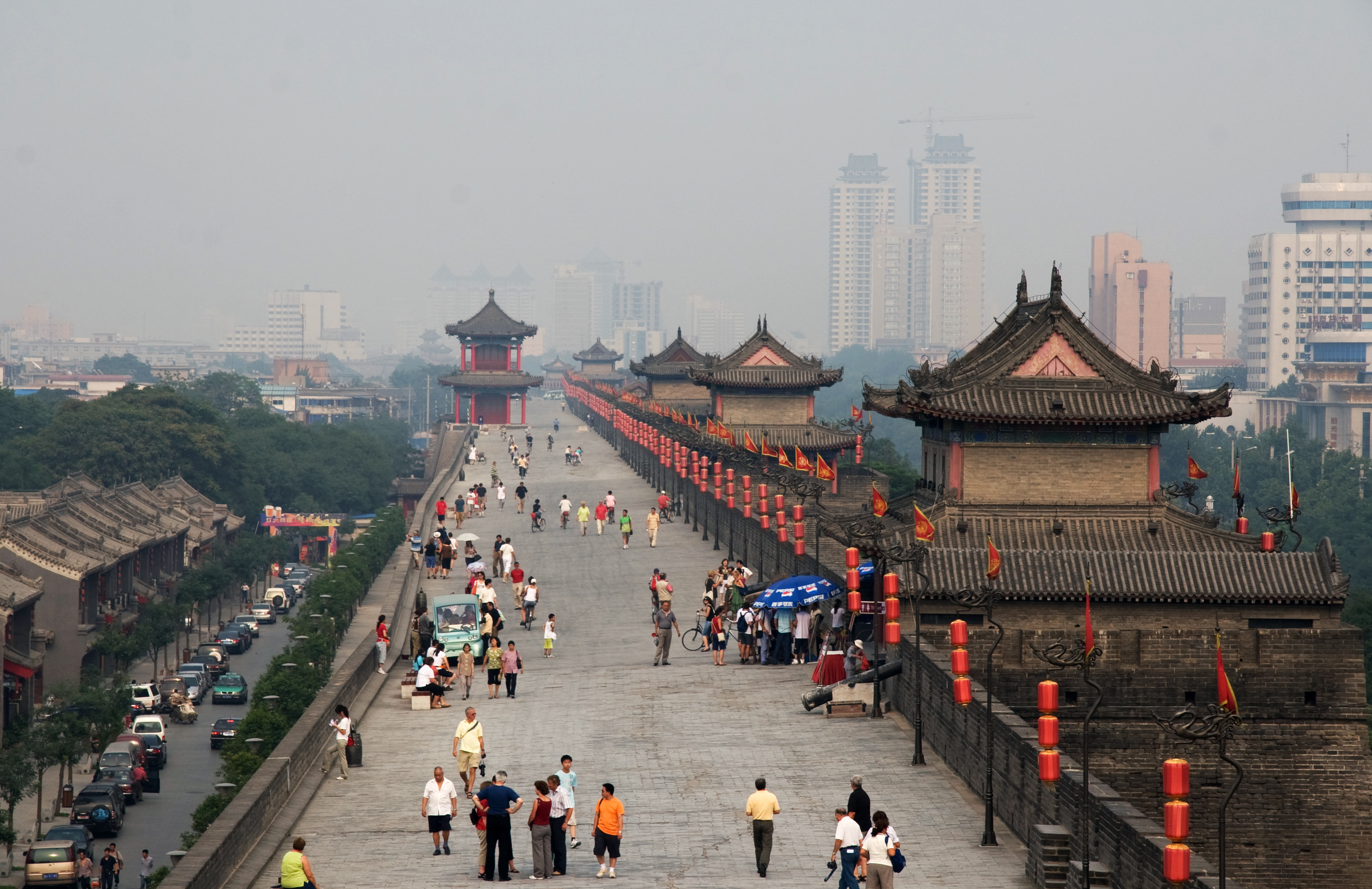
Left: A South Gate barbican entrance of Xi'an Right: Another view of Xi'an City Wall

The southern embrasured watchtower constructed in 1378, was destroyed by fire in 1926 during the civil war of 1926, and was restored in September 2014. This was done after a careful historical review of documents related to the historical features that existed before it was damaged. The other three watchtowers forming the northern, eastern and western gates of the wall were also examined during the planning phase of the modifications done for the South Tower. They were modified, without affecting the integrity of the wall, by an encompassing hall offering protection to the structures by using steel, wood work and the ancient-type tiles and bricks structure. Major gates have ramp access except the South Gate which has entry outside the walls.

There is an "Archery Tower", which provides security to one of the four gates of the Xi'an wall. Created as a large trap-like chamber, capped by a tower filled with windows, it gave an advantageous position for archers to shoot arrows (in the initial years of building the wall) and later cannonballs at the opposing revolutionary forces. In the event that the enemy was able to breach the walls through the main gate they would become trapped in the small chamber that faced yet another gate and thus be easy targets for the defending troops.

== Bibliography ==
- Lynn, Anne Wien (2013). All Things Chorus. iUniverse. ISBN 978-1-4759-5947-5.
- Bushell, Stephen W. (2012). Chinese Art. Parkstone International. ISBN 978-1-78042-924-3.
- So, Billy K.L.; Zelin, Madeleine (2013). New Narratives of Urban Space in Republican Chinese Cities: Emerging Social, Legal and Governance Orders. BRILL. pp. 233–34. ISBN 978-90-04-24991-2.
